= Ultraman Zero Side Story: Killer the Beatstar =

- Official poster
- Directed by: Yuichi Abe
- Written by: Kenichi Araki
- Produced by: Hiroyasu Shibuya; Haruto Nakayoshi
- Starring: Shota Minami; Hiroyuki Konishi; Mitsutoshi Sundo; Tao Tsuchiya
- Production company: Tsuburaya Productions
- Distributed by: Bandai Visual
- Release dates: November 25, 2011 (STAGE I); December 22, 2011 (STAGE II)
- Running time: 33 minutes per episode
- Country: Japan
- Language: Japanese

Ultraman Zero Side Story: Killer the Beatstar (ウルトラマンゼロ外伝 キラー ザ ビートスター, Urutoraman Zero Gaiden Kirā Za Bītosutā) is a Japanese direct-to-video two part series, serving as a sequel of 2010 Ultra Series movie Ultraman Zero: The Revenge of Belial. The series was released separately, The Metallic Space (鋼鉄の宇宙, Kōtetsu no Uchū) in November 25 and Oath in the Meteor (流星の誓い, Ryūsei no Chikai) on December 22, 2011. It is also served as a prologue to Ultraman Saga, and simultaneously promoting the film's release.

== Synopsis ==
=== Stage I: The Metallic Space ===
Jean-Bot and Princess Emerana were kidnapped by a mysterious celestial sphere, with the rest of the Ultimate Force Zero arrived too late to save them.

A week later, ZAP Spacy members Rei and Hyuga were on a trip to Planet Buram (惑星ブラム, Wakusei Buramu) while their ship, Space Pendragon, was under maintenance. The pair discovered the celestial sphere on a collision course with Planet Buram and decided to take matters into their own hands by intruding into it through a small crack. Rei discovered Emerana and rescued her by summoning his Gomora to take on the Legionoid that was chasing her, but three other robots appeared and overpowered the monster in an instant. Using the Ultimate Aegis, Zero, Mirror Knight and Glenfire jumped from across the multiverse to get into the celestial sphere to reunite with Emerana and saved the three from the incoming robots. The sphere's controller then sent Jean-Killer into the fray against Ultimate Force Zero and a brainwashed Jean-Bot against the humans. In the middle of the chaos, Ultraman, Zoffy and Ultraseven flew to the celestial sphere.

=== Stage II: Oath in the Meteor ===
Rei summoned his Litra (S) to delay Jean-Bot while Emerana and Hyuga tried to hide from the brainwashed robot. Emerana managed to command her brainwashed guardian to stop, inadvertently freezing Jean-Killer as well. The three humans entered Jean-Bot's cockpit to discover the robot had sabotaged his own internal workings in order to free himself from the brainwashing. Jean-Bot then revealed the mastermind's identity, Beatstar, a program who controlled the celestial sphere to destroy planets rich in organic life forms. By amassing data of multiple robots, he mass-produced them as his armies and compiled their data (including Jean-Bot's as the base model) into Jean-Killer.

While repairing Jean-Bot, the three realized that as Jean-Killer was created from the former, he also reacted to Emerana's voice and could be convinced to turn to their side, which they eventually did. Zoffy, Ultraman and Seven lent their assistance by delaying the sphere from its collision course and Jean-Killer directed the team to Beatstar's control room on the hemispheric moon. As Zero entered the control room, Beatstar revealed that his creators came from a universe that was destroyed by an invader. Said invader's victims created the sphere to escape their doomed universe, but its inhabitants raged war against one another and eventually went extinct. The war within the sphere convinced Beatstar to eradicate all life forms to preserve peace in outer space. Beatstar then exited his control panel and fought Zero directly, eventually overpowering him. Jean-Killer saved Zero and with Hyuga's piloting, they were able to defeat Beatstar, causing the sphere and its entire robot army to self-destruct. By taking account of the Ultimate Force Zero members and the ZAP Spacy team's assistance, Emerana decided to rename Jean-Killer as Jean-Nine and instructed Jean-Bot to be his tutor.

== Production ==
In the original planning, the series was meant to feature Musashi Haruno, the protagonist of Ultraman Cosmos and simultaneously celebrated the aforementioned series' 10th anniversary. However, director Yuichi Abe (who also directed Revenge of Belial) studied the connection between the Mega Monster Battle series and Cosmos, thus concluding the original plan to be scrapped, saving Musashi's appearance for Ultraman Saga and replace it with the Ultimate Force Zero. In addition, the return of Princess Emerana and Jean-Nine's debut were tributes to the 2011 earthquake that affected the East Japan. Jean-Nine (who at that time was addressed as Jean-Killer) was meant to transform into a combat tank, hence the visible threads on its back. Deathfacer, a robot from 1998 Ultra Series movie Ultraman Tiga & Ultraman Dyna: Warriors of the Star of Light, was planned to appear as one of Beatstar's army but instead the suit was modified into the main villain himself.

== Cast ==
- Rei (レイ): Shota Minami (南 翔太, Shōta Minami)
- Hyuga (ヒュウガ, Hyūga): Hiroyuki Konishi (小西 博之, Konishi Hiroyuki)
- Kumano (クマノ): Mitsutoshi Shundo (俊藤 光利, Shundō Mitsutoshi)
- Princess Emerana (エメラナ姫, Emerana-hime): Tao Tsuchiya (土屋 太鳳, Tsuchiya Tao)
- Ultraman Zero (ウルトラマンゼロ, Urutoraman Zero; Voice): Mamoru Miyano (宮野 真守, Miyano Mamoru)
- Glenfire (グレンファイヤー, Gurenfaiyā): Tomokazu Seki (関 智一, Seki Tomokazu)
- Mirror Knight (ミラーナイト, Mirā Naito): Hikaru Midorikawa (緑川 光, Midorikawa Hikaru)
- Jean-Bot (ジャンボット, Jan Botto): Hiroshi Kamiya (神谷 浩史, Kamiya Hiroshi)
- Jean-Nine (ジャンナイン, Jan Nain): Miyu Irino (入野 自由, Irino Miyu)
- Ultraman (ウルトラマン, Urutoraman): Susumu Kurobe (黒部 進, Kurobe Susumu)
- Zoffy (ゾフィー, Zofī): Hideyuki Tanaka (田中 秀幸, Tanaka Hideyuki)
- Ultraseven (ウルトラセブン, Urutorasebun): Kohji Moritsugu (森次 晃嗣, Moritsugu Kōji)
- Beatstar (ビートスター, Bītosutā): Unshō Ishizuka (石塚 運昇, Ishizuka Unshō)

== Ending theme ==
- "Susume! Ultraman Zero" (すすめ! ウルトラマンゼロ, Susume! Urutoraman Zero; "Let's Go! Ultraman Zero")
  - Lyrics: Hideki Tama (田靡 秀樹, Tama Hideki), Tomohiro Yamaguchi (山口 智大, Yamaguchi Tomohiro)
  - Composition & Arrangement: Takao Konishi (小西 貴雄, Konishi Takao)
  - Artist: Voyager and Shota Minami
