= List of Ultraman Taiga episodes =

This is the episode list of Ultraman Taiga (ウルトラマンＴ(タイガ), Urutoraman Taiga), a Japanese tokusatsu television series produced by Tsuburaya Productions as part of the long-running Ultraman series. The series premiered on TV Tokyo on July 6, 2019.

== Episodes ==
No.	Title	Written by	Original release date
0	"Ultraman Taiga Story"; Transliteration: "Urutoraman Taiga Sutōrī" (Japanese: ウルトラマンタイガ物語(ストーリー))	Unknown	June 22, 2019
Taro chronicles the exploits of Ultra Brothers, Ultraman Mebius and Ultraman Zero to his son Taiga, as well as receiving visions of Ultraman Titas and Fuma. This special is streamed on Tsuburaya Production's YouTube channel for two weeks before the premier of the series and uses clips from Ultraman Saga, Ultraman Mebius Side Story: Ghost Reverse and Ultra Zero Fight.
1	"Buddy Go!"; Transliteration: "Badi Gō!" (Japanese: バディゴー！)	Sotaro Hayashi	July 6, 2019
The Tri-Squad and New Generation Heroes fought against Tregear in a fight which caused the former team to disappear in space. 12 years later, E.G.I.S. officers Hiroyuki and Homare try to escort the Alien Rivers Kawazu in order to deliver a Baby Zandrias, but their deal was cut short after he paid for their service, leading to the child being captured by the Alien Magma to lure its mother into fighting Zegun for the Villain Guild to sell their monster for auction. When Kirisaki summoned Hellberus, it killed Zegun and try to attack the Zandrias family before Hiroyuki's resolve to save the baby allow him to become one with the Ultraman named Taiga. After saving the child, he defeated Hellberus with Ultraman Orb's Orb-let with both Ultra and the youth witnessing the Zandrias family's departure.
2	"Tregear"; Transliteration: "Toregia" (Japanese: トレギア)	Takao Nakano	July 13, 2019
12 years prior, Hiroyuki bonded with Taiga's scattered particles of light after a failed attempt to save the baby Guesra, Chibisuke. In the present day, E.G.I.S. was requested by External Affairs Division X to hunt a trio of aliens and their monster King Guesra during their target on cacao bean supplies. Recognizing that King Guesra is in fact Chibisuke, Hiroyuki attempts to bring his friend to its senses until Tregear appears and kills the monster in cold-blood.
3	"Avenger of the Star"; Transliteration: "Hoshi no Fukushūsha" (Japanese: 星の復讐者)	Sotaro Hayashi	July 20, 2019
After being killed in a satellite explosion, Rento was revived by Tregear to exact his revenge on the Cozmo Technica president Imazato. He appeared a month after the incident and faced against E.G.I.S. members Hiroyuki and Homare, who was assigned to protect the president. When Rento becomes Galactron MK2 and fought Taiga, Titas purify his spirit by reuniting him with Nana, allowing them to pass on to the afterlife. With Galactron and a descending satellite destroyed, Titas had a brief fight with Tregear before adjusting his life as Hiroyuki's second Ultraman.
4	"Requiem of the Wolves"; Transliteration: "Gunrō no Banka" (Japanese: 群狼の挽歌)	Takao Nakano	July 27, 2019
External Affairs Division X requested help from E.G.I.S. when a trio of rogue members from Villain Guild set up a monster bomb. After getting the information from Fanton and Zolin, Homare and Hiroyuki were kidnapped by Volk and his cohorts until an assassin sent by Zolin attacked them. As Taiga fought against Darebolic (MB) in the city, a dying Volk revealed that he was deceived by Kirisaki and his wish is to help the impoverished alien children. From his jewelry, Fuma appeared and reunited with the Tri-Squad, using his speed to disorient and destroy Darebolic (MB). Tregear interfered once more and retreated after shrugging off Fuma's attack.
5	"The Future You Decide"; Transliteration: "Kimi no Kimeru Mirai" (Japanese: きみの決める未来)	Aya Satsuki	August 3, 2019
Following the first defeat of Segmeger, Alien Damara appeared and reveal that the monster will remain exist so long that its summoner is still around. With the injured Hiroyuki analyzed every available cameras, Pirika took on the surveillance mission and met Aoi as they skipped their respective jobs to hang out. After her true nature as an Alien Seger exposed, she summoned Segmeger to wreak havoc on the city. While the monster managed to defeat all three members of Tri-Squad, Pirika managed to encourage Aoi to choose her own path as Aoi sacrificed herself to heal Titas and brought an end to the monster.
6	"The Flying Saucer Is Not Coming"; Transliteration: "Enban ga Konai" (Japanese: 円盤が来ない)	Junichiro Ashiki	August 10, 2019
The Alien Gapiya "Abel" was hired by Tregear to kill the Tri-Squad but spends the remainder of the episode trying to hunt Kana and a homesick alien who wanted Abel's help to leave Earth. As the Tri-Squad fought against Abel, Kana managed to make the alien rethink of his decision to leave Earth as he finally agreed that he liked the planet and wished to spend more time in it.
7	"To the Demon's Mountain!!"; Transliteration: "Ma no Yama e!!" (Japanese: 魔の山へ!!)	Sotaro Hayashi	August 17, 2019
8	"Defeat the Demon"; Transliteration: "Akuma o Ute" (Japanese: 悪魔を討て)	Sotaro Hayashi	August 24, 2019
9	"The Present for Each"; Transliteration: "Sorezore no Ima" (Japanese: それぞれの今)	Uiko Miura	August 31, 2019
10	"Warriors in the Evening Glow"; Transliteration: "Yūbae no Senshi" (Japanese: 夕映えの戦士)	Sachio Yanai	September 7, 2019
11	"The Afternoon When the Star Magic Faded"; Transliteration: "Hoshi no Mahō ga Kieta Gogo" (Japanese: 星の魔法が消えた午後)	Hirotoshi Kobayashi	September 14, 2019
12	"Even Then, the Universe Will Still Go on Dreaming"; Transliteration: "Soredemo Uchū wa Yume o Miru" (Japanese: それでも宇宙は夢を見る)	Hirotoshi Kobayashi	September 21, 2019
13	"E.G.I.S. Major Confrontation"; Transliteration: "Ījisu Chō Kaigi" (Japanese: イージス超会議)	Junichiro Ashiki	September 28, 2019
14	"The Power to Protect and the Power to Fight"; Transliteration: "Mamoru Chikara to Tatakau Chikara" (Japanese: 護る力と闘う力)	Kyoko Katsuya	October 5, 2019
15	"I Can't Hear Your Voice"; Transliteration: "Kimi no Koe ga Kikoenai" (Japanese: キミの声が聞こえない)	Takao Nakano	October 12, 2019
16	"We Are One"; Transliteration: "Warera wa Hitotsu" (Japanese: 我らは一つ)	Sotaro Hayashi	October 19, 2019
17	"Guardian Angel"; Transliteration: "Gādian Enjeru" (Japanese: ガーディアンエンジェル)	Sachio Yanai	October 26, 2019
18	"For the New World"; Transliteration: "Atarashiki Sekai no Tame ni" (Japanese: 新しき世界のために)	Junichiro Ashiki	November 2, 2019
19	"Withstand the Lightning Strike!"; Transliteration: "Raigeki o Hanekaese!" (Japanese: 雷撃を跳ね返せ！)	Misaki Morie	November 9, 2019
20	"Sand Castle"; Transliteration: "Suna no Oshiro" (Japanese: 砂のお城)	Takao Nakano	November 16, 2019
21	"Friend in Earth"; Transliteration: "Hoshi no Yūjin" (Japanese: 地球の友人)	Hirotoshi Kobayashi	November 23, 2019
22	"What's Up With Takkong?"; Transliteration: "Takkongu wa Nazo da" (Japanese: タッコングは謎だ)	Sachio Yanai	November 30, 2019
23	"Clash! Ultra Big Match!"; Transliteration: "Gekitotsu! Urutora Biggu Matchi!" (Japanese: 激突！ウルトラビッグマッチ！)	Aya Satsuki	December 7, 2019
24	"I'm Pirika"; Transliteration: "Watashi wa Pirika" (Japanese: 私はピリカ)	Takao Nakano	December 14, 2019
25	"Buddy, Steady, Go!"; Transliteration: "Badi Sutedi Gō!" (Japanese: バディ ステディ ゴー！)	Sotaro Hayashi	December 21, 2019
As the tension between humans and aliens begin to grow, Pirika's attempt to sacrifice herself in order to eliminate Woola leads to the realization that it was only cursed by its own hunger. Former Villain Guild members Alien Magma and Merkind offer their assistance to neutralize Woola as Taiga fed the monster with his and Tregear's energy, ending the monster's life in a peaceful way. After rejecting his last chance at redemption, Tregear fought against Taiga Tri-Strium and seemingly obliterated by exposing himself to the Quattro Squad Blaster, seeing Taro's image in the young hero in his final moments.
26	"And Taiga Is Here"; Transliteration: "Soshite Taiga ga Koko ni Iru" (Japanese: そしてタイガがここにいる)	Ryo Ikeda	December 28, 2019
