= Ultraman Zero =

- Ultra Series character
- A full picture of Ultraman Zero in his pre-fighting stance.
- First appearance: Mega Monster Battle: Ultra Galaxy (2009)
- Created by: Koichi Sakamoto; Junya Okabe; Yuji Kobayashi (naming)
- Designed by: Masayuki Gotoh
- Portrayed by: Hideyoshi Iwata (Revenge of Belial onwards); Daisuke Terai (Ultraman Retsuden); Masaki Onishi (Ultra Galaxy Legend); Satoru Okabe (X and Geed); Shinnosuke Ishikawa (Orb)
- Voiced by: Japanese: Mamoru Miyano (Japanese); English: Daniel Van Thomas (William Winckler Productions); Jack Merluzzi (UGF:NGH); Eric Kelso (UGF:TAC); Sean Schemmel (Z)
- Species: Ultra
- Gender: Male
- Title: Son of Seven
- Occupation: Member of the Inter-Galactic Defense Force; Leader of Ultimate Force Zero
- Affiliation: Inter-Galactic Defense Force; Ultimate Force Zero; New Generation Heroes
- Fighting style: Space Kenpō
- Weapon: Zero Sluggers; Ultimate Bracelet
- Family: Ultraseven (father); Unnamed mother
- Relatives: Ultraman Taro (cousin once removed)
- Origin: Nebula M78, the Land of Light

Ultraman Zero (ウルトラマンゼロ, Urutoraman Zero) is a fictional character from the Ultra Series. He first appeared in the movie Mega Monster Battle: Ultra Galaxy before starring in his own film Ultraman Zero: The Revenge of Belial and its 2012 sequel Ultraman Saga.

Introduced as an energetic, boastful, and stubborn warrior, Zero was sent into banishment by Ultraseven after his failed attempt to steal the Plasma Spark. Zero was trained under Ultraman Leo and was forced to wear the Tector Gear. When Ultraman Belial returned to the Land of Light and steal the Plasma Spark, Zero redeemed himself by defeating Belial and retrieving the Plasma Spark, at the same time learned of his origin as the son of Seven (セブンの息子, Sebun no Musuko). Although he retained his hotheaded traits, Zero slowly went through character development and matured as his roles in the Ultra Series progressed.

Ultraman Zero is voiced by Mamoru Miyano (宮野 真守, Miyano Mamoru). In the English dub movies, he is voiced by Daniel Van Thomas.

== Character conception ==
Movie producer Junya Okabe stated that Zero's involvement in Mega Monster Battle: Ultra Galaxy was to invoke the elements of a parent-child relationship. Ultraman Zero's title as "the son of Seven" laid a huge impact on the audience. The setting of Zero as Leo's pupil was made under suggestion of director Koichi Sakamoto incorporating elements of his favorite Kung fu films. His youthful and hot-blooded outlook is based on Joe Yabuki from Ashita no Joe while his fighting skills revolves around the combination of Ultraseven and Leo.

In Ultraman Saga, a comical plot was suggested to the character as a new element and Zero's 5 meter-transformation is based on proposal made by VFX producer as part of an Ultra Warrior's relationship with humanity.

Series main writer Otsuichi was dubious of Zero's involvement as part of the cast of Ultraman Geed, believing that he is a poor character but director Sakamoto managed to expand him by forming a senior-junior pair with the titular Ultra. Realizing that he is a powerful character, the director decided to include the destruction of Ultimate Bracelet as a handicap to Zero, which makes him all the more similar to Dan Moroboshi's situation in Ultraman Leo. His transformation style from Leito Igaguri was consciously modeled after Ultraseven's use of Ultra Eye.

=== Design ===
Ultraseven Ax, the initial draft of Ultraman Zero as photographed in a special event in Tokyo Dome City during 2010.

Ultraman Zero was designed by Masayuki Gotoh under the initial draft name Ultraseven Ax (ウルトラセブンアックス, Urutorasebun Akkusu). The original design was based on a modernized variation of Ultraseven, being all-red in color and lacked a Color Timer. Due to how common the red color is among Ultra Warriors, blue was added as well to make him more attractive to new viewers. His mouth design is similar to Seven, but the whole face is composed of diagonal lines, and it has become possible to show different expressions according to the angle.

Zero's suit was simultaneously made with Ultraman Belial, based on wetsuits with the materials shaped in a three-dimensional appearance. It was originally structured to fit the suit actor tightly in hopes of preventing wrinkles but was loosen a bit to increase mobility in Zero's actions.

Although the mask was originally molded integrally with the head, Zero and Belial were structured out of plane. Because of the finalized design of Zero's head turned out to be different, his Zero Sluggers were forced to be redesigned after the first filming of Mega Monster Battle: Ultra Galaxy, thus making it bigger than the intended size. The LED emitters were placed at the center of his eyes, appearing in a similar manner to pupil.

According to Ultra's Common Sense - Ultraseven, Ultraman Zero ver., the appearance of Zero's younger self is "suggested" to be identical to ESP Alien Uringa (超能力星人 ウリンガ, Chō Nōryoku Seijin Uringa) from episode 29 of Ultraman Leo.

Designs of other forms were as follows:

- Tector Gear Zero: Originally dubbed as "Armored Ax" (アーマードアックス, Āmādo Akkusu). Because of the difficulty in designing Zero, Tector Gear Zero was made first to hide his original appearance. It was initially planned to have a sharp design but producer Junya Okabe proposed a daring appearance. Its suit is a separate molding from the original Zero while the orange tubes were portrayed to be able to expand and contracting itself.
- Ultimate Zero: The Final Ultimate Zero configuration was taken from the original plan of having the Zero Sluggers into a bow instead of the Zero Twin Sword. In the beginning, this form is meant to be an armament than a mode change. The armor is designed after a pair of wings and its breastplate was meant to be worn on the left arm. Its relation to Ultraman Noa is a tribute to episode 7 of Ultraman, doing so in hopes of invoking the relationship of the Stone of Baraj to Noa.
- Mode Change: Strong-Corona Zero and Luna-Miracle Zero, the two forms that appeared in Ultra Zero Fight were incorporated with elements from Ultramen Dyna and Cosmos.
- Ultraman Zero Beyond: Masayuki Gotoh designs Zero completely different from any of his previous forms, this one only inheriting his face. The entire body was designed so as to not resemble Zero or even the components of the Ultra Capsule's Ultras themselves (Ginga, Victory, X, and Orb). Masayuki even decided to drop the idea of Quattro Sluggers, believing that said design is unfavorable but changes his mind after persuasion from Koichi Sakamoto.

=== Naming ===
Yuji Kobayashi revealed that the reason he named the character as "Zero" is to symbolize the "restart of Ultraman story from scratch".

== History ==
=== Galaxy Crisis Era ===
==== Mega Monster Battle: Ultra Galaxy ====
Long ago, Zero was a young and powerful warrior, similar to Belial, and like him attempted to steal energy from the Plasma Spark. However, Zero was caught red handed by Ultraseven and the Ultra Brothers and was exiled, sent to be trained under the Leo Brothers in Planet K76. His training took place during Belial's second and successful attempted theft of Plasma Spark. Survivors of Belial's attack, Shin Hayata (Ultraman) and Mirai Hibino (Ultraman Mebius), considered recruiting Zero but Dan Moroboshi (Ultraseven) was against it, believing he wasn't ready. During his time training under Ultraman Leo, Zero was forced to wear the Tector Gear armor that limited his movements and strength and befriended a Pigmon.

During a training session, Zero stops training with Leo to save the Pigmon's life when a boulder was about to crush him. Leo and Ultraman King realized that Zero he had matured and revealed to him his true origins as the son of Ultraseven. The reason Seven stopped Zero from touching the Plasma Spark and banished him was to save Zero from following Belial's fallen path. Seven's Eye Slugger then landed at the training ground, Leo realized that Seven was calling for Zero's help against Belial at the Monster Graveyard, and King removed the locks on Zero's Tector Gear. Redeemed and now freed from his armor, Ultraman Zero took off to the Monster Graveyard to confront Ultraman Belial, with his father's Eye Slugger. However Zero was too late too save his father, and Seven died from the exhaustion and injuries from his battle. Angered by the passing of his father, Zero proceeded to kill the remaining monsters of Belial's army in a mad fury before facing Belial and defeating him, however Belial quickly re-emerged as Belyudra. Zero tapped into the Plasma Spark's power, creating the Zero Twin Sword and decimated Belial with it. In aftermath of the battle, Zero returned the Plasma Spark to its position and reunited with his revived father.

==== Ultraman Zero: The Revenge of Belial ====
During the events of The Revenge of Belial, an attack from a trio of Darklops prompted Zero to volunteer himself in an inter-dimensional exploration to track the source. He was given the Ultra Zero Bracelet by Ultraseven, which allowed him to transform three times in an alternate dimension and received help from residents of the Land of Light during the travel. Upon arrival, he fought against Legionoid armies on the Planet Anu and bonded with a local police miner named Run in order to save his life. However, Zero discovered that the man's consciousness was in comatose state, leaving the former in control of Run's body and took care of Nao, his younger brother. The two stowed away in the Jean-Bird but was spared by Princess Emerana when they decided to help her search for the Shield of Baraj. Along the way, they met and allied with several factions that guide them towards the Shield of Baraj and helped out holding off Belial Galactic Empire's army.

Upon arrival at Ultraman Noa's statue, Nao tried to install a shard piece he had to the shield but crumbled. With Belial's army approaching and the Planet of Mirrors shattering, Run saved Nao and Emerana at the cost of being captured and had his Ultra Zero Eye separated. The resistances arrived and Mirror Knight saved Run from Belial, allowing him to regain his Ultra Zero Eye and transformed into Zero. Both sworn enemies fought once more but Belial used all of the emeralds he stolen to transform into Arch Belial. Despite the resistant forces helping out as well, Zero died from the depletion of his energy while trying to shield Planet Esmeralda from Arch Belial until the hopes of the resistances of Belial Galactic Empire brought forth the spirit of Ultraman Noa, allowing him to revive Zero and grant him the true form of the Shield of Baraj: the Ultimate Aegis. Zero assumed Ultimate Zero form with it and destroyed Belial with the Final Ultimate Zero technique. In aftermath of the battle, he healed Run's injuries and left to form Ultimate Force Zero with the giant heroes he came across earlier.

==== Ultraman Saga ====
Zero still continued with his mission to wipe out the remnants of Belial's army and at that time, he was called into another Planet Earth by Shin Asuka/Ultraman Dyna, sensing a new threat in a form of Alien Bat. In that world, he discovered that the Earth's populations had mysteriously vanished and also fused with a dimensional-displaced Super GUTS member named Nozomu Taiga. Taiga himself had a hatred for Ultramen due to his past, which explained his reluctance to use Zero's power. Zero tend to act as the straight man to Taiga's antics and because of their lack of cooperation, Zero was incapable of summoning his full power, only appearing as a 5 m tall version of himself during their first transformation. Upon learning of Taiga's past and the latter deciding to overcome it, the two eventually settled their differences and finally being able to perform a successful transformation, joining forces with Ultraman Cosmos in facing Gigant Hyper Zetton and rescuing Ultraman Dyna.

Although the three Ultra Warriors managed to destroy Gigant Zetton, Alien Bat made his final move by assimilating his ship into Zetton's corpse and form Imago Hyper Zetton. The monster was too much for the Ultra Warriors to handle and the monster quickly defeated them. While Dyna and Cosmos were forced to revert to their human hosts, Zero instead died once more but the three Ultra hosts managed to unite into Ultraman Saga and destroy the monster. In aftermath, Zero separated from Taiga and departed to space.

In Ultraman Saga Super Complete Works magazine, Zero was mentioned to have visited the alternate Earth once more, with Anna of Team U wrote his arrival in her diary. Ultraman Ginga S Super Complete Works acknowledged that Zero's arrival on Team U's Earth is partly under orders from Zoffy due to the increasing negative energy of a Zetton (Hyper Zetton) in that dimension.

==== Ultra Zero Fight ====
Following his separation from Ultraman Saga, Zero gained the abilities of Ultraman Dyna and Cosmos, allowing him to transform into Strong-Corona Zero and Luna-Miracle Zero. Zero went to the Monster Graveyard to train and wonder about the purpose of obtaining such power. At that time, he faced of against Alien Bat Glacier and his army of revived monsters. Zero used his new powers to eliminate the monsters before facing the alien himself, now having absorbed the defeated monsters' souls. In the ensuing battle, Glacier used his life link to Pigmon as an advantage, forcing Zero to surrender until Pigmon's reassurance gave him the will to continue fighting, splitting himself into two bodies. Using Strong-Corona Zero he defeated Glacier and with Luna-Miracle Zero was able to purify the restless monsters' spirit and save Pigmon's life. In the end, Zero finally found the purpose of his powers before returning to his comrades.

Shining Zero (above) and Zero Darkness (below), two of the miniseries-exclusive forms.

In the second part, Zero faced off against the Darkness Five led by a mysterious benefactor. The Ultimate Force Zero held off the majority of their members their own while Zero faced against the Alien Mefilas Sly to rescue Pigmon. Later on, he faced the Armored Darkness, who was revealed to be his supposedly deceased enemy, Ultraman Belial. The two fought in a heated match but once Zero stabbed Belial with his sword, Belial quickly possessed Zero into Zero Darkness (ゼロダークネス, Zero Dākunesu), using his powers to assassinate the rest of the Ultimate Force Zero. The real Ultraman Zero was left powerless inside his own body, leaving Belial in control his body to lead the Darkness Five in their conquest. Pigmon tried to stop them despite its size but before Belial could kill it, his attacked mysteriously stopped. It was revealed that Zero's spirit had halted Belial from attacking or progress further. Within Zero's mind, fought Belial, bringing forth his strongest form, Shining Zero. With Belial expelled, Shining Zero regained control over his body and reverse the flow of time in the immediate area to undo the damages done by Belial and revive the Ultimate Force Zero. The act greatly exhausted him and was unable to recall earlier incidents but in the end joined his comrades in returning home as they tried to pick a new name for Pigmon.

In the epilogue, it was revealed that Zero unknowingly resurrect Belial and Jathar from their deaths, the latter being his first kill in the second part of series in hopes of restoring the Ultimate Force Zero from their bronze petrifaction.

==== Subsequent history in Galaxy Crisis Era ====
- Ultra Galaxy Legend Side Story: Ultraman Zero vs. Darklops Zero (2010): After the events of Ultra Galaxy Legends, Zero teamed up with an alternate universe version of ZAP Spacy crew to fight against the Alien Salome and their armies of fake Ultra Brothers. Weeks passed, when the prime universe version of ZAP Spacy arrived, Zero defend them against Mecha Gomora before fighting Darklops Zero, a robot built after him. Zero was banished into a pocket dimension by said robot and escaped it with the help of his master Ultraman Leo, returning just in time to assist Gomora on a duel against their mechanical doppelgängers. With Zero winning, Darklops self-destruct himself, prompting him to rescue the prime reality ZAP Spacy members.
- Ultraman Zero Side Story: Killer the Beatstar (2011): One year after the events of Revenge of Belial, the Ultimate Force Zero broke into the Beatstar Celestial Sphere to rescue both the kidnapped Jean-Bot and Emerana. A week later, they managed to get enter the sphere and saved ZAP Spacy members Rei and Hyuga, as well as Emerana herself. Zero, Mirror Knight and Glenfire fights against copies of King Joe, Inpelaizer and Ace Killer before engaging in a fight against Jean-Killer, Beatstar's newest robot themed after Jean-Bot. After Jean-Bot recovered from his brainwashing, he and Emerana convinced Jean-Killer to redeem himself, allowing him to join the group in fighting against his own creator. In the end, Jean-Killer was accepted into Ultimate Force Zero as Jean-Nine.
- Ultraman Saga: Zero and Ultra Brothers Pop Out! Intense Battle! (2012): Prelude to the events of Ultraman Saga, Zero fights against Zetton until the monster was called off by Alien Bat, who replaced it with a revived Birdon. With his energy running out due to Bat's Anti Ultra Field, Zoffy appeared and handed Zero the Ultra Converter, replenishing his energy and for the two to finish Birdon together. Zoffy soon informs Zero that Alien Bat is planning to create a monster weapon, with the Birdon earlier is simply one of his revived monsters and thus setting the motion of the aforementioned movie's event.

Ultraman Zero hosting Ultraman Retsuden.

- Ultraman Retsuden/Shin Ultraman Retsuden (2011–2016): Ultraman Zero is the main navigator of the series, and usually guides the viewers with full details of each Ultra Warriors' past battles. Similar to his role in Ultraman Saga, he also tended to act in a similar manner of a straight man but when he went absent during the show, he would be replaced by other navigators such as Zoffy, Musashi Haruno, Shin Asuka and others. Zero continued this role in the succeeding series, Shin Ultraman Retsuden although there were also other presenter such as the characters of succeeding series (e.g. Ultraman Ginga, Ultraman Taro and Ultraman X). In the series finale of said series (episode 155), he was featured as one of the three navigators, with the other two being Ultraman Ginga and Ultraman X, whose series had launched in the same block the Shin Ultraman Retsuden aired.

=== New Generation Heroes Era ===
- Ultraman Ginga S The Movie (2015): Having known Etelgar's mission to imprison Heisei Ultras, Zero hunted him down in various universes and dimension until he comes across Hikaru and Sho, arriving after Etelgar. With Etelgar proves to be stronger than Ginga and Victory, and even being able to withstand the Final Ultimate Zero, he trained the duo Ultra Hosts and gave them the Ultra Fusion Brace once their training had been acknowledged. Alongside other preceding Heisei Ultras, Zero contributed his signature finisher, the Wide Zero Shot, to Hikaru's Ultra Fusion Brace for the completion of Ultraman Ginga Victory. While the party made their way to Etelgar's tower, he was forced to left behind to fight against an imitation of Ultraman Belial. Zero fought Belial with all of his forms and put an end to the doppelganger via Shining Zero. He joined the other Ultra Warriors afterwards to destroy Etelgar's castle before regrouping and leaving. He was briefly mentioned in Ultra Fight Victory by Ultraman Leo when he first met Ultraman Ginga and Victory.
- Ultraman X (2015): Zero was tracking one of the Space Garrisons' (宇宙警備隊, Uchū Keibitai) most wanted criminals, Bandero in various dimensions and arrived on Earth when he tried to steal the Spark Dolls. With Rui accidentally taken to Planet Guillermo, Zero went on a rescue operation and joined by X, the two managed to defeat both Bandero and Black King. He was mentioned in episode 13 by Sho/Ultraman Victory of his encounter though much to the latter's dismay, Ultraman X isn't what he expected due to his human host (Daichi) until Sho trained the boy in swordsmanship. His usage of Mode Change in episode 5 was a late addition by Koichi Sakamoto after seeing Ultraman X's use of Ultraman Zero Armor, as well as the original costumes still in good condition. Meanwhile, his lines in the series was written by Nakano from Akira Kobayashi's performance in Senpūji film series.
- Ultraman X The Movie (2016): Ultraman Zero's Cyber Card was created by Guruman sometime later alongside other Ultra Warriors that X and Xio members met before. The Ultramen cards resonated with people's hopes and brought them to fight against the Tsurugi Demaaga that rampaged worldwide. Zero fought against one in Shanghai, China and like the rest of the Ultra Warriors, he was given an additional power boost to destroy the monsters. The Ultra Warriors regrouped and Zero commented on how both X and Daichi have become stronger than the last time they met. While leaving Earth, he made his last stop on Rui, much to her delight.
- Ultraman Orb (2016): Ultraman Zero was mentioned to be the sealer of Maga-Pandon before Jugglus released the King Demon Beast. Upon its defeat, Zero's Ultra Fusion Card was acquired by Gai, who used it alongside Ultraman Jack's card to transform into Ultraman Orb Hurricane Slash. During the final episode of the series, Zero and the other Ultra Fusion Cards in Gai's possession transform into physical projections of themselves to assist Ultraman Orb in delivering the finishing blow on Magata no Orochi while Juggler hold off the monster long enough to expose its weak spot.
- Ultraman Zero: The Chronicle (2017): Zero reassumed his role as a navigator of this biography series.
- Ultraman Orb The Movie (2017): In the beginning of the movie, Zero went to Orb's aid in defeating Murunau's Galactron on Hawaii and reported him of a strange incident before leaving. He returns at the post credit scene where he sought Gai's help in assisting Ultraman X fighting against Desastro.
- Ultra Fight Orb (2017): Under orders from the Space Garrison, Zero was sent to investigate the darkness of Planet Yomi until Juda Specter and Mecha Gomora fought him. He was aided by Ultraman Orb after the latter sensed the same darkness and the two were led to Reibatos. When Orb failed to catch him, Zero and Seven trained him inside the Shining Field (シャイニングフィールド, Shainingu Fīrudo) for 10 years. Once Orb's training ended, Zero's Ultra Fusion Card was used in unison with Seven's card into Emerium Slugger and the three of them raced towards the Monster Graveyard to fight Tyrant before he brought Orb to stop Reibatos. After the battle, Zero was the only witness to the sudden disappearance of Reibatos' Giga Battle Nizer but choose to keep it to himself.
- Ultraman Geed (2017): Ultraman Zero appeared in this series as a secondary character. Zero had been present at the battle between Belial and the Ultra Warriors, but was defeated by his arch enemy, allowing Belial to initiate the Crisis Impact that resulted in Ultraman King sacrificing himself to protect the fate of the universe. Fast forward to several years, he was sent to Earth to retrieve the stolen Ultra Capsules but his Ultimate Bracelet damaged from his past battle. He formed a symbiosis with a salaryman named Leito Igaguri to recuperate and observe Ultraman Geed while saving the human's life. After sacrificing his life to protect Leito, Riku/Geed and several other humans held captive by Kei, Zero was revived through his human host's will and receive the ability to transform into Ultraman Zero Beyond after Hikari delivers a set of Riser and Ultra Capsules. His corresponding Little Star hosted Leito's daughter Mayu, who gains the ability to teleport until her prayer for Geed allowed Riku to harvest it as Zero Capsule (ゼロカプセル, Zero Kapuseru). Zero mainly served as Geed's support in his battles against Belial, the Ultraman later leaving Leito's body once his nemesis is defeated so he can return to Planet Ultra with his repaired Ultimate Bracelet.
- Ultraman Geed the Movie (2018): When Gilvalis sent his Galactron armies to attack the Earth, Zero lead his team to fight the Galactron forces in outer space before entering the mid-digitized Earth. There, he join forces with Geed and Orb to fight against Galactron MK2 in Okinawa using all of their available forms. Zero and Orb teleported into the next day through Shining Zero's Shining Star Drive to fake their demise and possess Leito as he assume Zero Beyond. The three Ultras then storm Gilvalis' base to fight the rogue AI, bearing witness of Geed delivering the final blow by himself. Zero regroups with the Ultimate Force Zero to bid Riku and Laiha farewell before departing from Earth.
- Ultraman R/B (2018): Zero's corresponding R/B Crystal was in possession of Kumashiro Matsuo, the coach of White Bears baseball team until he relinquished it to Katsumi alongside Seven and X's crystals. His power allows Rosso to perform Zero Twin Slicer through his R/B Slugger Rosso.

=== Reiwa Era ===
- Ultra Galaxy Fight: In the English dub, Zero was initially voiced by Jack Merluzzi in New Generation Heroes before Eric Kelso took over since The Absolute Conspiracy.
  - New Generation Heroes (2019): Sent by the Inter-Galactic Defense Force, Zero chased Dark-Killer in his attempt to target Grigio, only to wind up trapped in Dark-Killer Zone alongside the young Ultrawoman. A rescue party of New Generation Heroes assembled by Taro arrived in Planet Tenebris to rescue them. After defeating Rosso and Blu, Dark-Killer used Zero's drained light energy and his past trauma to recreate Zero Darkness but was defeated by R/B. In a desperate attempt to spite the Ultra Warriors, Tregear revived Dark-Killer and Zero Darkness, Zero choosing to fight the latter in his Beyond form. As the rest of the New Generation Heroes chase after Tregear, Zero send Grigio back to Earth under the Minato brothers' wishes.
  - The Absolute Conspiracy (2020): In the light of Tartarus' involvements, Zero went to investigate the alien on his accord and begins amassing the team known as Ultra League. The Ultra League was sent to rescue Yullian and fight the Zetton Army. Despite Zero's attempt at fighting Tartarus, he was defeated and Yullian was successfully kidnapped to become a ransom for the Absolutians to get the Land of Light. Due to Celebro's theft of Ultra Medals and Z Riser, Zero was forced to depart from the Ultra League and join Z, thus setting forth the motion of Ultraman Z series.
  - The Destined Crossroad (2021–22): After returning from Ultraman Z, Zero trained under the guidance of Seven, Leo and Joneus to awaken his wild instinct, granting him the Wild Burst and the ability to counter Tartarus' prediction and using it to fight the Absolutian in Planet Babel and Planet Blizzard. After Tartarus, Diavolo and Ultraman Ribut's disappearances, Zero then trains with Ultraman Regulos in anticipation for the Inter-Galactic Defense Force's meeting with the Absolutians' unseen ruler.
- Ultraman Taiga (2019): Zero appears to aid Taiga in his fight against Tregear and Imit-Ultraman Belial, when both sides collided in a beam struggle. Zero handed Hiroyuki the Plasma Zero-let, allowing Taiga to perform Taiga Dynamite Shoot and defeating the Belial clone before he leaves.
- Ultraman Chronicle Zero & Geed (2020): Despite being a clip show meant to commemorate his 10th anniversary, Zero only appeared in since episode 8 where he had established his namesake school attended by Riku, Pega and several other aliens.
- Ultraman Z (2020): Zero returned in this series as a reluctant instructor to the Inter-Galactic Defense Force member Ultraman Z. The pair chased the Celebro-possessed Genegarg after it stole a Z Riser and a set of Ultra Medals. When Zero was about to be sucked into Bullton's portal, he gave Z his Z Riser and a trio of Ultra Medals, one of them being his personalized Ultraman Zero Medal (ウルトラマンゼロメダル, Urutoraman Zero Medaru) that allows him to assume Ultraman Z Alpha Edge. Zero escapes with the use of Shining Zero, where he participated in the fight against Celebro's Belial Fusion Monsters alongside Z and Geed. After the battle, he decided to return to the Land of Light and left Earth's safety in Z's hands. Together with Geed and Belial Atrocious, the Ultraman Zero Beyond Rise Medal (ウルトラマンゼロビヨンドライズメダル, Urutoraman Zero Biyondo Raizu Medaru) provides Z with Delta Rise Claw.
- Ultraman Teo (2026):

== Profile ==
Ultraman Zero's statistics below were never mentioned in his movie appearances, but were brought up in magazines and official websites.

- Height: micro ~ 49 m (55 m when including the tip of Ultimate Aegis, 5 m when shrunk in Ultraman Saga)
- Weight: 35,000 t (45,000 t as Tector Gear Zero/Hatred, 55,000 t as Ultimate Zero)
- Flight Speed: Mach 7 (Mach 13 as Zero Beyond)
- Age: 5,900 years old (Age is equivalent to 18 ~ 20 in human years.)
- Birthplace: Nebula M78, Land of Light
- Year Debut: 2009
- First Appearance: Mega Monster Battle: Ultra Galaxy (2009)
- Family Structure:
  - Father: Ultraseven
  - Mother: Stated to be an excellent scientist in the Land of Light's Department of Space Science and Technology (宇宙科学技術局, Uchū Kagaku Gijutsu-kyoku), though other details regarding her is yet to be revealed.

=== Description ===
As the official website of Tsuburaya Productions stated: "[Ultraman Zero] His father being Ultraseven, taught by the Ultraman Leo/Astra siblings, chased the evil Belial into another space, receiving the Ultimate Bracelet and finally thwarted the Belial Galactic Empire. Alongside Glenfire, Mirror Knight, Jean-Bot and Jean-Nine, they form the Ultimate Force Zero."

=== Transformation ===
Zero's hosts transform through the use of Ultra Zero Eye (ウルトラゼロアイ, Urutora Zero Ai), which is based on Ultraseven's Ultra Eye. During the transformation scene, once they don it, the ribbons of light and the Zero Sluggers appear with Zero's body materializing on the human host's before the Zero Sluggers attach and appeared in the human world. When not in use, the Ultra Zero Eye is stored within the Ultra Zero Bracelet (now Ultimate Bracelet) and can also be utilized in a similar manner to a handgun by his hosts when needed. The left part of the google emblazoned Zero's signature. (Note: In the original draft, it was supposed to be the word "Zero" written in the form of "Ultra character" (ウルトラ文字, Urutora moji).)

- Ultra Zero Eye NEO (ウルトラゼロアイNEO, Urutora Zero Ai Neo): An upgraded variant of the Ultra Zero Eye, serving as Leito's transformation device. Leito transforms by donning the Zero Eye and press the button on the right goggle, causing Zero to develop around his body and him rising in a similar manner to conventional Ultra Warriors. By attaching it to the Riser, it provided the latter device's Zero Mode (ゼロモード, Zero Mōdo).
- Riser (ライザー, Raizā): The same model of Geed Riser (ジードライザー, Jīdo Raizā) that is used by Riku and Kei, it was delivered by Ultraman Hikari alongside a batch of New Generation Capsules. Leito first attach the Ultra Zero Eye NEO to the Riser and scans a pair of Ultra Capsules (ウルトラカプセル, Urutora Kapuseru), New Generation Capsule Alpha (ニュージェネレーションカプセルα, Nyū Jenerēshon Kapuseru Arufa; Ginga and Orb) and New Generation Capsule Beta (ニュージェネレーションカプセルβ, Nyū Jenerēshon Kapuseru Bēta; Victory and X) to perform Neo Fusion Rise (ネオ・フュージョンライズ, Neo Fyūjon Raizu) and transforms into Ultraman Zero Beyond. Likewise with Riku's Geed Riser, the Ultra Capsule announcements were provided by Nobuyuki Hiyama (檜山 修之, Hiyama Nobuyuki). As established in Ultra Galaxy Fight: New Generation Heroes, this form requires a human host (Leito) to access with and during his fight with Ultraman Zero Darkness, Geed and his preceding New Generation Heroes recreate this form through their power.

=== Features and weapons ===
- Beam Lamp (ビームランプ, Bīmu Ranpu): A small light located on his forehead, which mainly functions to launch the Emerium Slash (エメリウムスラッシュ, Emeriumu Surasshu). It is among the features inherited from his father.
- Protector (プロテクター, Purotekutā): Silver armor on Zero's chest and shoulders which functions as solar panels, allowing him to put out of exhaustion for a longer period in combat. Compared to his father, Zero possess a Color Timer (カラータイマー, Karā Taimā) on its intersection, allowing him to perform the Zero Twin Shoot (ゼロツインシュート, Zero Tsuin Shūto).
- Zero Sluggers (ゼロスラッガー, Zero Suraggā): Twin boomerang knives from his head, they are analogous to Ultraseven's Eye Slugger. They can be combined into multiple configurations, such as Zero Twin Sword (ゼロツインソード, Zero Tsuin Sōdo), which he created by tapping into the Plasma Spark's power and Combination Zero (コンビネーションゼロ, Konbinēshon Zero) shuriken by combining with his father's Eye Slugger. In the Ultraman Saga Zero & Ultra Brothers Pop Out, The Zero Twin Sword can still be used as a boomerang while its attack was enhanced by Zoffy's M87 Ray.
- Ultra Zero Bracelet (ウルトラゼロブレスレット, Urutora Zero Buresuretto): A bracelet that Seven gave to Zero, which allowed him to transform three times in an alternate universe. After receiving the Ultimate Aegis from Ultraman Noa, the bracelet was upgraded into the Ultimate Bracelet (ウルティメイトブレスレット, Urutimeito Buresuretto), now allowing him to endlessly operate in any alternate universes. (Note: In the toy release, it was named as "Ultraman Saga Brace" (ウルトラマンサーガブレス, Urutoraman Sāga Buresu), with its default state called "Ultraman Zero Mode" (ウルトラマンゼロモード, Urutoraman Zero Mōdo).) According to director Yuichi Abe, the Ultimate Bracelet is not only Noah's power, but also contains the lights of people's hearts from every universes, thus making it the strongest item to exist. As of Ultraman Geed, the device broke due to Zero's past battle with Belial and his current power diminishment. True to being analogous to Ultraman Jack's Ultra Bracelet, the bracelet can also turn into weapons such as:
  - Ultra Zero Spark (ウルトラゼロスパーク, Urutora Zero Supāku)
  - Ultra Zero Lance (ウルトラゼロランス, Urutora Zero Ransu)
  - Ultra Zero Defender (ウルトラゼロディフェンダー, Urutora Zero Difendā)
- Ultra Converter (ウルトラコンバーター, Urutora Konbātā): After being weakened in Alien Bat's Anti Ultra Field, Zero was given the Ultra Converter by Zoffy to recharge his energy, allowing them to finish Birdon.
- Ultra Zero Mantle (ウルトラゼロマント, Urutora Zero Manto): A special protective mantle given to him by master, Leo. When not in use, he can store it within the Ultimate Bracelet.
- UltRise Bracelet (ウルトライズブレスレット, Urutoraizu Buresuretto):
  - UltRise Eye (ウルトライズアイ, Urutoraizu Ai):

=== Forms, powers and abilities ===
Being trained by Ultraman Leo, Zero utilizes Judo and Space Kenpō (宇宙拳法, Uchū Kenpō) in combat. He is also capable of adapting his opponent's fighting skills to his own such as copying Glenfire's piledriver attack (Glen Driver) into Zero Driver (ゼロドライバー, Zero Doraibā). His finisher is the Wide Zero Shot (ワイドゼロショット, Waido Zero Shotto), which is performed in his master's pre-fighting stance before shifting to the "L"-style beam attack used by Ultraseven. His flying kick attack, Ultra Zero Kick (ウルトラゼロキック, Urutora Zero Kikku) is learned from his master (Leo)'s Leo Kick and alongside the latter, both are capable of performing combination attacks such as Leo Zero Kick (レオゼロキック, Reo Zero Kikku) and Leo-Zero Double Flasher (レオゼロダブルフラッシャー, Reo Zero Daburu Furasshā), replacing Astra's position in both attacks.

He can also access these forms:

- Tector Gear Zero (テクターギア・ゼロ, Tekutā Gia Zero): During Zero's banishment and training under Ultraman Leo, he was forced to wear the Tector Gear (テクターギア, Tekutā Gia) armor that limited his strength and performance. Eventually after his redemption had been acknowledged by Ultraman King, he was freed from the armor itself. While facing Alien Bat Glacier, he was imprisoned in a rust-colored variant Tector Gear Hatred (テクターギア・ヘイトリッド, Tekutā Gia Heitoriddo) that increases the injuries he sustained. Eventually, he was able to escape via Strong-Corona Mode.
- Zero Slugger Gear (ゼロスラッガーギア, Zero Suraggā Gia): Appearing in Ultraman Festival 2010, these are armaments wielded by Zero when his Zero Sluggers transform into a set of armors. Zero separates into three, with the two clones assumed different armor respectively. They are designed by the children as part of New Power-up Armor Design Contest (新強化アーマーデザインコンテスト, Shin Kyōka Āmā Dezain Kontesuto), and represented different magazines:
  - Super Form (スーパーフォーム, Sūpā Fōmu): Represent the winner in the Televi-kun, Super Form appears as a blue armor transformed from the power of sacred light. It gives Zero a sleeker fighting style, allowing him to move at great speed while using blade protrusions on his arms as weapons. Through the giant star emblem on his chest, Zero is able to execute Emerium Star Beam (エメリウムスタービーム, Emeriumu Sutā Bīmu).
  - Keeper Form (キーパーフォーム, Kīpā Fōmu): Represent the winner in the Televi Magazine, Keeper Form appears as a silver armor that grants him enhanced brute strength. Zero's main weapons are a shield on the left arm and the Reflection Blade (リフレクションブレード, Rifurekushon Burēdo) on his right that allows him to absorb an incoming attack and return it to their owner.
- Ultimate Zero (ウルティメイトゼロ, Urutimeito Zero): A form where Zero dons the Ultimate Aegis (ウルティメイトイージス, Urutimeito Ījisu), it allows Zero to travel to other dimensions and universes. This armor grants him the Ultimate Zero Sword (ウルティメイトゼロソード, Urutimeito Zero Sōdo), enables him to fight stronger opponents and be reconfigured into a bow and arrow, allowing him to initiate his finisher, the Final Ultimate Zero (ファイナルウルティメイトゼロ, Fainaru Urutimeito Zero), or a stronger variant, the Final Ultimate Zero Trinity (ファイナルウルティメイトゼロ・トリニティ, Fainaru Urutimeito Zero Toriniti), with the help of Ultramen Dyna and Cosmos. The Ultimate Aegis' true form is the Shield of Baradhi (バラージの盾, Barāji no Tate), which was sought by resistance of Belial's Galactic Empire to defeat him, and later bestowed to Zero by Ultraman Noa. Despite being so powerful, once used for cross-universe transportation, the armor needed to be recharged before being utilized again. Certain opponents seems to have natural resistance towards the attack such as Etelgar, who was able to survive the attack despite having his scarf and mask burned in the process. The data of Ultimate Aegis was replicated by Dr. Guruman in Ultraman X for the titular character to assume Ultraman Zero Armor.
- Mode Changes (モードチェンジ, Mōdo Chenji): These are alternate forms achieved after Zero's combination with Dyna and Cosmos to form Ultraman Saga.
  - Strong-Corona Zero (ストロングコロナゼロ, Sutorongu Korona Zero): Zero's red alternate form, which served as an analogy to Dyna's Strong Type and Cosmos' Corona Mode. It allows Zero to utilize brute strength and initiate the Ultra Hurricane (ウルトラハリケーン, Urutora Harikēn) before using the Gulnate Buster (ガルネイトバスター, Garuneito Basutā) as a finisher. As a side effect of the transformation, Zero speaks in an exciting tone.
  - Luna-Miracle Zero (ルナミラクルゼロ, Runa Mirakuru Zero): Zero's blue alternate form, which served as an analogy to Dyna's Miracle Type and Cosmos' Luna Mode. It allows Zero to utilize speed and mental abilities and use the Miracle Zero Slugger (ミラクルゼロスラッガー, Mirakuru Zero Suraggā) as his finisher. As a side effect of the transformation, Zero speaks in a calm monotone. Since this form bears some of the traits of Cosmos' Luna Mode, Zero is capable of using the Full Moon Wave (フルムーンウェーブ, Furu Mūn Wēbu), a non-lethal ray that pacifies monsters.
- Shining Ultraman Zero (シャイニングウルトラマンゼロ, Shainingu Urutoraman Zero): Zero's "final form", which acquired when he expelled Belial from his body. Here, Zero's body bore gold and silver and possess the Shining Energy Core (シャイニングエナジーコア, Shainingu Enajī Koa) in place of his Color Timer. His main attack is Shining Emerium Slash (シャイニングエメリウムスラッシュ, Shainingu Emeriumu Surasshu) which is an enhanced versions of his regular attack. However, his strongest known ability is the Shining Star Drive (シャイニングスタードライヴ, Shainingu Sutā Doraivu), which rewinds time in a certain area but being the strongest attack, it exhausts Zero greatly before reducing him to his original form. In the PlayStation Portable game Ultraman All Star Chronicle, he demonstrated an attack called the Shining Wide Zero Shot (シャイニングワイドゼロショット, Shainingu Waido Zero Shotto). (Note: In Ultraman All Star Chronicle, the attacks are written as S Emerium Slash (Sエメリウムスラッシュ, Esu Emeriumu Surasshu) and S Wide Zero Shot (Sワイドゼロショット, Esu Waido Zero Shotto).)
- Crossover Formation (クロスオーバーフォーメーション, Kurosu Ōbā Fōmēshon): A momentary power boost that is nigh-identical to Ultraman Tiga's Glitter Tiga. Appeared in Ginga S The Movie, this form is used by all Heisei Ultras to empower their finishers and destroy Etelgar's castle.
- Ultraman Zero Beyond (ウルトラマンゼロ ビヨンド, Urutoraman Zero Biyondo): A form that appears in Ultraman Geed achieved by using the Riser in Zero Mode. It features him using the assets of Ultramen Ginga, Victory, X, and Orb. Zero is capable of launching four Quattro Sluggers (クアトロスラッガー, Kuatoro Suraggā) and perform continuous punch and kick attacks. His finishers are the Bulky Chorus (バルキーコーラス, Barukī Kōrasu) and Wide Beyond Shot (ワイドビヨンドショット, Waido Biyondo Shotto). In Ultra Galaxy Fight: New Generation Heroes, Zero Beyond was covered with glittering light, christening this form as Galaxy Glitter (ギャラクシーグリッター, Gyarakushī Gurittā).
- Gransabered Zero (グランセイバードゼロ, Guranseibādo Zero): A game-exclusive Ultra Fusion that appeared in the 2020 installment of Ultraman Fusion Fight! arcade game. This is accessed through an Ultra Z Riser (ウルトラゼットライザー, Urutora Zetto Raizā) with Leito's personalized Ultra Access Card (ウルトラアクセスカード, Urutora Akusesu Kādo) and Ultra Medals (ウルトラメダル, Urutora Medaru) of Ultraman, Seven and Ace. This form provides Zero with slicing abilities and the finishing move Defalation Cutter (ディファレーションカッター, Difarēshon Kattā)
- Ultimate Shining Zero (ウルティメイトシャイニングゼロ, Urutimeito Shainingu Zero): First appearing in Ultra Galaxy Fight: The Absolute Conspiracy, this form is Shining Ultraman Zero wearing the Ultimate Aegis armor onto himself. Since it requires Zero to access both of his strongest assets at once, it also exhaust him due to the massive energy consumption required.
- Wild Burst (ワイルドバースト, Wairudo Bāsuto): A crimson colored form that represents his awakened wild instincts, which allows him to counter Absolute Tartarus' ability to predict his moves. This form is later served as a transition to Ultimate Shining Zero, passing its ability to the latter form as a result. First appearing in Ultra Galaxy Fight: The Destined Crossroad.
- Ultraman Zero Cosmo Rise (ウルトラマンゼロコスモライズ, Urutoraman Zero Kosumo Raizu): An original Ultraman-themed form accessed by the UltRise Eye. Using the Cosmo Record Wall allows Zero to summon past Ultra Heroes and their abilities. First appearing in Ultraman Zero Cosmo Rise: Rise! Heroes of Light.

=== Ultra Warriors with Zero's powers ===
The list below refers to later Ultras who possess a replica of or inherited their powers from Ultraman Zero.

- Ultraman Ginga Victory
- Ultraman X Ultraman Zero Armor (Note: Also read as "Ultimate Zero Armor".)
- Ultraman Orb: Hurricane Slash (with Ultraman Jack), Emerium Slugger (with Ultraseven), Leo Zero Knuckle (with Ultraman Leo)
- Ultraman Geed: Magnificent (with Father of Ultra), Shining Mystic (with Ultraman), Mugen Crosser (with Ultraman Tiga)

== Human hosts ==
=== Run ===
Run
- Ultra Series character
- Run as portrayed in the movie.
- First appearance: Ultraman Zero: The Revenge of Belial (2010)
- Portrayed by: Yu Koyanagi

Run (ラン, Ran) is one of the main protagonists of Ultraman Zero: The Revenge of Belial.

Alongside his brother Nao, both were orphaned and lived with their grandmother, working as police in a mining site of their home planet Anu. One day, when Belial's Darklops attacked the mining site, Zero bonded with Run to save the young man's life, but learns that he is in control of Run's body, as the original one is rendered comatose. After the events of the movie, a fully healed Run was separated from Zero, and has no recollection of the moments when Zero possessed him, much to Nao's dismay.

Run is portrayed by Yu Koyanagi (小柳 友, Koyanagi Yū), while his childhood was portrayed by Kaito Nitta (新田 海統, Nitta Kaito).

=== Shin Moroboshi ===
Shin Moroboshi (モロボシ・シン, Moroboshi Shin) is a stage-show exclusive character that appeared in Ultraman Premier 2011 (ウルトラマンプレミア2011, Urutoraman Puremia Nisen-jū-ichi). He is the human disguise of Ultraman Zero and was portrayed by three different actors in each region:

- Daisuke Watanabe (渡辺 大輔, Watanabe Daisuke): Nagoya
- Mamoru Miyano: Tokyo (also Zero's original voice actor)
- Naoki Kawano (川野 直輝, Kawano Naoki): Osaka

=== Nozomu Taiga ===
Nozomu Taiga
- Ultra Series character
- Nozomu Taiga as portrayed in the movie.
- First appearance: Ultraman Saga (2012)
- Portrayed by: DAIGO

Nozomu Taiga (タイガ・ノゾム, Taiga Nozomu) is the main protagonist of Ultraman Saga and is the second host of Ultraman Zero. Originated from the same universe where Ultraman Tiga and Ultraman Dyna took place, Taiga is the rookie member of Super GUTS after Asuka's disappearances. Taiga bears a lot of similarities to young Asuka (even called by senior Super GUTS members as "the second coming of Shin Asuka") but however lacks respect in his predecessors, especially Ultramen after his parents were killed in an alien invasion while he shouted for Ultraman's help but to no avail. He appears to have hatred for carrots and in an aforementioned similarity, tends to act childish with Zero acting up as the straight man.

During the 15 year anniversary of Asuka's sacrifice, Taiga participated in an aerial combat against a troop of leftover Sphires whom tried to attack the Mars Colony. During the fight, he was brought to another world by accident and forcefully bonded with Zero after his near-death experiences in saving a boy. While butt heads with Zero due to his hatred for Ultraman, but after learning the truth of Team U (the alternate Earth's attack team)'s origin, he decided to adopt the mantle of Ultraman and puts aside his differences. After the event, he decided to stay on the alternate Earth than returning to his home world, wanting to observe the planet's future.

Nozomu Taiga was portrayed by DAIGO. As a child, Taiga was portrayed by Mitsumasa Sato (佐藤 光将, Satō Mitsumasa).

=== Leito Igaguri ===
Leito Igaguri
- Ultra Series character
- Leito in episode 3 of Ultraman Geed.
- First appearance: Ultraman Geed Episode 3: Salaryman Zero (2017)
- Portrayed by: Yuta Ozawa

Leito Igaguri (伊賀栗 レイト, Igaguri Reito) (Note: His given name is written in kanji as "令人".) is one of the protagonists of Ultraman Geed, a mukoyōshi of the Igaguri family. Age 30 years old, Leito is a weak-willed but serious family man with who works as a salaried worker from the Business Affairs of Tanimaru Company (株式会社谷丸商事, Kabushikigaisha Tanimaru Shōji). Despite the hardships he faced in his life, Leito sees his family as a motivation to work harder.

During one of Geed's fights, Leito died getting hit by a truck while attempting to save a Little Star holder named Toru Honda from being crushed by debris. Zero, touched by the human's bravery and needing a host to recuperate in, merged into Leito's body to restore him to life. While originally preferring to watch Geed's battles from afar, his body occasionally taken by the impatient Zero and is forced to participate and assist the young warrior. During Zero's death at the hands of Galactron, Leito harbors a huge remorse for being helpless during that time until his new resolve allowed Zero to be revived and obtain the Riser to utilize Ultraman Zero Beyond. While fighting against Belial Atrocious, the injuries sustained from Zero was carried on towards Leito, forcing him to be hospitalized as Geed took over and emerged victorious. Leito and his family approached Zero for the last time before he return to his home world.

Leito Igaguri was portrayed by Yuta Ozawa (小澤 雄太, Ozawa Yūta) and is named after the novelist Greg Egan. Yuta mentions that as a child, he always wanted to become Father of Ultra, yet his character transforms into Ultraman Zero. Leito (as Zero's host) being the father of a family is made under suggestion by writer Otsuichi as a contrast to Riku Asakura/Ultraman Geed's relation to Belial. Otsuichi was very cautious if his idea of Leito being a salaried worker would be reject, but the staff accepted it without any problems. Ozawa was taught by suit actor Hideyoshi Iwata of Zero's fighting skills to portray Zero when Leito was under his possession, and thus his performance was commended by director Sakamoto.

== In other media ==
=== Anime ===
The Ultimate Force Zero meets Wooser in episode 1, season 3 of Wooser's Hand-to-Mouth Life.

- Ultraman Zero and the rest of the Ultimate Force Zero appeared in the third season of Wooser's Hand-to-Mouth Life, Phantasmagoric Arc as part of Tsuburaya Productions' collaboration with the Sanzigen anime studio. In the third season's first episode, Wooser was piloting the Mecha Wooser and win against a space armada. But in the aftermath of the battle, he and his mecha are left stranded in space, until he finds himself in a luminous light, where Ultraman Zero (accompanied by the Ultimate Force Zero), encourages him and thus helps Wooser to return to Earth. Zero makes his appearance again as a poster in Wooser's room and again as action figures alongside his teammates. In said anime, the main character Wooser is also voiced by Mamoru Miyano, who performs a dual role with Ultraman Zero. A year earlier, in February 2014, the official blog of Ultraman Retsuden promoted Miyano's single NEW ORDER that was used for Wooser's Hand-to-Mouth Life Awakening Arc. The blog also noted of Miyano's role in Wooser and jokingly added if Wooser were to meet Ultraman Zero someday.

=== Apps ===
- In late 2013, LINE announces the second release of Ultraman stickers sold at the price of US$1.99. Zero was among the caricatures featured in the sets alongside other Ultra Warriors and Ultra Monsters.
- As a tie-in to the Ginga S Movie, a smartphone game was released, called the Ultra 10 Braves (ウルトラ10勇士, Urutora Jū Yūshi). Zero was reimagined as the original ninja from Sanada Ten Braves, Sarutobi Sasuke (猿飛 佐助), also called as Zero (零呂). His main weapon is a dagger.

=== Music video ===
- Ultraman Zero and the members of the Ultimate Force Zero (barring Jean-Nine) appeared in the Girl Next Door's music video Unmei no Shizuku ~Destiny's star~, with said song was used as the ending theme for Ultraman Zero: The Revenge of Belial.
- Ultraman Zero is featured in Mamoru Miyano's 9th single, Ultra Fly as a background character. The song as well becomes the 6th opening of Ultraman Retsuden.

=== Video games ===
- Compati Hero Series
  - Ultraman Zero is one of the playable characters in the crossover game HEROES' VS.
  - Ultraman Zero is featured as one of the characters in the Lost Heroes crossover game series, formed by Kamen Rider Series, Gundam and the Ultra Series. The game's main feature enables the players to perform team-up and crossover finishers with any characters from different franchise. One peculiar combination is Ultimate Zero and GNT-0000 00 Qan［T］ (Setsuna F. Seiei) in the game's second install Lost Heroes 2 by performing GN Ultimate Zero Sword (GNウルティメイトゼロソード, Jī Enu Urutimeito Zero Sōdo), where both draw their swords and creates a huge GN Particle/Ultimate Aegis-powered energy sword before dropping it towards the enemy. After the battle, the two shouted their respective catchphrases. This team-up is rather interesting, as both Ultraman Zero and Setsuna share the same voice actor.
- Zero appeared in the 14th level of the 2017 survival horror game City Shrouded in Shadow, entering the stage to aid Ultraman and Ultraman Taro just as Ultraman Belial overwhelms the two. Though beaten down by the evil Ultraman at first, the three Ultra Warriors, by the end of the stage, vanquish Belial with the combined forces of their respective energy beams.
- Alongside Belial, Zero was featured in the mobile game Ultra Kaiju Battle Breeders. Their inclusion were made under the milestone celebration of Mega Monster Battle: Ultra Galaxy's tenth and said mobile game's one year anniversary.
- Ultraman Zero is part of the characters in Ultraman:Be Ultra, a mobile game based on the Ultraman manga. He is represented as an Ultraman Suit modeled after his likeness. His main weapon is the Zero Lance (ゼロランス, Zero Ransu), based on Ultraman Zero's Ultra Zero Lance.
- Ultraman Zero, along with his nemesis Ultraman Belial, are released on July 9, 2026 as part of the third Ultraman DLC for the kaiju brawler GigaBash.

=== Virtual reality ===
- A virtual reality movie of Ultraman Zero was held on August 26 and 27, 2017 in selected VR Theaters in Japan. It featured Ultraman Zero fighting against Eleking with the viewers watching the battle from an office building.

== Reception ==
According to an interview with Famitsu, Mamoru stated that "I was honestly surprised! At last I have become an Ultraman (laughs)". He reminisces his days as a child watching the Ultra Series during summer breaks but unfortunately wasn't able to watch the entire series. His favorite Ultra Series is Ultra Seven and Ultraman Taro, as well as finding the chibi characters of Ultra Series (such as those from Ultraman Kids) quite interesting. He is also impressed by how Zero's design armed with two Eye Sluggers and that the Ultra Warrior's fighting skill involves speed and space martial arts movements. In a 2013 interview with Susumu Kurobe (Shin Hayata/Ultraman's actor), he nominated Ultraman Zero as his favorite Ultra Warrior.

=== Popularity ===
A photo featuring Ultraman Zero choking a Kyubey rag doll, one of the viral internet memes among the Japanese fandom.

Ultraman Zero himself has his own official Twitter account, which started in 2010 and ended in March 2012. On March 1, 2011, he tweeted the readers to be careful of "strangers" that offered them the chance to become a "magical girl". The post itself is a joke to a popular anime series, Puella Magi Madoka Magica which featured the main antagonist Kyubey manipulating girls (including the main characters of that series) into a magical girl and had become viral in the Japanese fandom ever since, creating a strings of internet meme that featured Zero facing Kyubey.

In the Ultra Series' 45th anniversary, Ultraman Zero scored the first place in an Ultra Hero popularity ranking, but in another Ultra Hero poll in 2013, he scored the second place after losing to Ultraman Tiga.

In 2009, in conjunction to the promotion of Mega Monster Battle: Ultra Galaxy, Ultraseven and Ultraman Zero were among the promoters of the newly introduced Windows 7. Seven's participation into the press conference is due to his name. Another guest of honors/promoter of the press conference is voice actress/singer Nana Mizuki, whom (like Ultraseven) also had her name being revolved around the aforementioned number. He was among the Ultra Warriors that present in a 2013 award ceremony when the Ultra Series was nominated by Guinness World Records as the series with most spin-offs and sequels.

Ultraman Zero and Ultraseven were the guest of honors in the 2016 Oyako Day, which was held on July 24. Two days prior, the two won the "Oyako Grand Prize" by Bruce Osborn.
