= Phil Miler =

Brazilian actor and voice actor

- Occupation(s): Actor and voice actor
- Website: http://www.philmiler.com

Phil Miler is a Brazilian actor and an internationally awarded voice actor.

== Filmography ==
- 1999 - "Tiro & Queda" - (TV series) .... Jogador
- 2000 - Woman on Top (as Phil) .... Gaffer
- 2002 - Lost Zweig (voice)
- 2002 - Seja o Que Deus Quiser .... Cleonilson
- 2003 - Aquaria (uncredited) .... Tulio Fachini
- 2004 - Pele Forever (documentary) (voice)
- 2004 - "A Diarista" .... Hilton (1 episódio, 2004)
- 2004 - O Spa (TV series) .... Hilton
- 2004 - "Senhora do Destino" (TV series) .... Padre
- 2005 - The Snake King (TV movie) .... Dr. Richman (as Marcelo Gomes de Oliveira)
- 2005/2006 - "Os ricos também choram" (TV series) .... Adolfo Coimbra
- 2007 - Caixa Dois .... Manoel - Português
- 2008 - O Flagra, a Demissão e a Adoção (TV series) .... Ronaldo
- 2008 - "Casos e Acasos" (TV series) .... Ronaldo
- 2009 - Mega Monster Battle: Ultra Galaxy - Ultraman Leo (Voice)
- 2010 - "Bipolar" (TV series) .... Pachoulli
- 2010 - Ultraman Zero: The Revenge of Belial - Zoffy (Voice)
- 2011 - Rio - Avary intern/Waiter
- 2011 - O Palhaço (Movie) .... mayor Romualdo
- 2012 - Ultraman Saga - Ultraman Leo (Voice)
- 2024 - A Caverna Encantada - Goma Berh

== Sources ==
- Clube da Voz
- http://www.jornalbrasil.com.br/interna.php?autonum=12614
- https://web.archive.org/web/20110715104707/http://www.portaldapropaganda.com/midia/2010/03/0002
