= Hideyuki Tanaka =

Japanese actor (born 1950)

- 田中 秀幸
- Born: November 12, 1950 (age 75); Ōta, Tokyo, Japan
- Education: Toho Gakuen College of Drama and Music
- Occupations: Actor; voice actor; narrator
- Years active: 1970–present
- Agent: Aoni Production

Hideyuki Tanaka (田中 秀幸, Tanaka Hideyuki; born November 12, 1950) is a Japanese actor, voice actor and narrator from Tokyo who is attached to Aoni Production. He is a graduate of the Toho Gakuen School of Music. He is most known for his roles in One Piece (as Donquixote Doflamingo), Dokaben (as Tarou Yamada), Kinnikuman (as Terryman), Captain Tsubasa (as Roberto Hongo), Detective Conan (as Yūsaku Kudō), Transformers: Victory (as Star Saber), Touch (as Eijirō Kashiwaba), Saint Seiya (as Leo Aiolia, the narrator, and the first voice of Wolf Nachi) and narration, Metal Gear (as Hal Emmerich), F-Zero: GP Legend (as Captain Falcon), Slam Dunk (as Kiminobu Kogure) and the current voice actor of Zoffy in the Ultra Series.

== Filmography ==
=== Television animation ===
1970s

- Dokaben (1976) (Tarō Yamada)
- Future Boy Conan (1978) (Luke, Cheet)
- Wakakusa no Charlotte (1978) (Perkins)
- Mobile Suit Gundam (1979) (Woody Malden)

1980s

- Ganbare Genki (1980) (Shuichi Okamura)
- Tsurikichi Sanpei (1980) (Kenichi)
- Space Battleship Yamato III (Ryuusuke Damon)
- Urusei Yatsura (1981) (Kakashi no Sanshirō)
- Dr. Slump (1981) (Toriyama (Human), Scoop)
- Armored Fleet Dairugger XV (1982) (Shinji Ise)
- Kinnikuman (1983) (Terryman, Springman, Planetman, Cubeman, Watchman, Samson Teacher, etc.)
- Touch (1986) (Eijirō Kashiwaba)
- Ginga Nagareboshi Gin (1986) (Ben)
- Maison Ikkoku (1986) (Shoichirou Otonashi)
- Saint Seiya (1986) (Narrator, Wolf Nachi, and Leo Aiolia)
- Kiteretsu Daihyakka (1987) (Eitarō Kite)
- City Hunter (1987) (Hideyuki Makimura)
- Fist of the North Star 2 (1987) (Falco and Temujina)
- Moeru! Oniisan (1988) (Narration, Yoshimune)
- Ranma ½ (1989) (Torajirou Higuma)
- Transformers: Victory (1989) (Star Saber)

1990s

- Dragon Quest: The Adventure of Dai (1991) (Avan, Killvearn)
- Aoki Densetsu Shoot! (1993) (Osamu Hiramatsu)
- Slam Dunk (1993–96) (Kiminobu Kogure, Narration)
- Marmalade Boy (1994) (Jin Koishikawa)
- Magic Knight Rayearth (1994) (Rayearth)
- Detective Conan (1997–present) (Yūsaku Kudō)
- Cardcaptor Sakura (1998) (Fujitaka Kinomoto)
- Nightwalker (1998) (Cain)

2000s

- Hellsing (2001) (Enrico Maxwell)
- Kinnikuman Nisei (2002) (Terryman, Chloe)
- F-Zero Falcon Densetsu (2003) (Captain Falcon/Bart Lemming)
- One Piece (2003) (Donquixote Doflamingo)
- Akagi (2005) (Ichikawa)
- Monster (2005) (Wolfgang Grimmer)
- Welcome to the N.H.K. (2006) (Misaki's Uncle)
- Angel Heart (2006) (Hideyuki Makimura)
- NANA (2006) (Takashi Asano)
- Bleach (2007) (Shawlong Qufang)

2010s

- X-Men (2011) (Beast/Hank McCoy)
- Croisée in a Foreign Labyrinth (2011) (Oscar Claudel)
- Shirokuma Cafe (2012) (Higuma)
- World Trigger (2014) (Replica, Yūgo Kuga, Narration)
- Saint Seiya: Soul of Gold (2015) (Leo Aiolia, Narrator)
- Onihei (2017) (Samanosuke Kishii)
- Saint Seiya: Saintia Shō (2018) (Leo Aiolia)
- Sazae-san (2019–present) (Masuo Fuguta)

2020s

- Dragon Goes House-Hunting (2021) (Manticore)
- Shaman King (2021) (Matamune)
- Bleach: Thousand-Year Blood War (2022) (BG9)
- Tonari no Yōkai-san (2024) (Kazuhiko Nishiya)
- Kinnikuman: Perfect Origin Arc (2024) (Narrator)
- Ninja vs. Gokudo (2025) (Narrator)

Unknown date

- Beet the Vandel Buster (Narrator)
- Black Jack (Akira)
- Captain Tsubasa (Roberto Hongo)
- Crest of the Stars (Rock Lynn)
- My Daddy Long Legs (Jervis Pendleton)
- Dancougar - Super Beast Machine God (Alan Igor)
- Demashita! Powerpuff Girls Z (The Mayor)
- Digimon: X Evolution (Omegamon)
- Digimon Xros Wars (Apollomon)
- Doraemon (Suneo's Father [3rd voice])
- Gaiking Legend of Daiku-Maryu (Sakon)
- Get Backers (Sarai Kagenuma)
- High School! Kimengumi (Sakugo Jidai)
- Lady Lady!! (George Russell)
- Maple Town Stories (Papa)
- Mawaru Penguindrum as (Uncle Ikebe)
- Nils no Fushigi na Tabi (Gunnar)
- Ninja Scroll: The Series (Mufu)
- Nono-chan (Takashi Yamada)
- Sengoku Majin GoShogun (Kiri Gangrey)
- Space Runaway Ideon (Bes Jordan)
- Super Robot Wars Original Generation: Divine Wars (Gilliam Yeager)
- Tantei Gakuen Q (Dan Morihiko)

=== Original Net Animation (ONA) ===
- Ultraman (2019) (Shin Hayata)
- Pluto (2023) (Brau 1589)

=== Original Video animation (OVA) ===
- Prefectural Earth Defense Force (1986) (Toshiyuki Roberi)
- Legend of the Galactic Heroes (1988) (Jean Robert Lap)
- Blood Reign: Curse of the Yoma (1989) (Kazami)
- Riding Bean (1989) (Bean Bandit)
- Guyver (1989) (Agito Makishima)
- Record of Lodoss War (1990) (Slayn)
- Transformers: Zone (1990) (Star Saber/Victory Saber)
- RG Veda (1991) (Ashura-Ou)
- Ys II (1992) (Keath)
- Ai no Kusabi (1992-1994) (Katze)
- Rayearth (1997) (Lexus, Narrator)
- Golden Kamuy (2019) (Tatsuya Nakazawa)
- Onna no Sono no Hoshi (2022) (Narrator)

Unknown date

- Angelique (Clavis)
- Carol: A Day in a Girl's Life (Rymon Douglas)
- The Deep Blue Fleet(Issei Maebara)
- Kamen Rider SD (Kamen Rider 1)
- Mobile Suit Gundam 0083: Stardust Memory (Green Wyatt)
- Shin Hokuto no Ken (Toki)
- Super Robot Wars Original Generation: The Animation (Gilliam Yeager)

=== Film animation ===
- Baldios (1981) (Jack Oliver)
- Kinnikuman Series (1984-1986) (Terryman)
- They Were 11 (1986) (King Mayan Baceska)
- Saint Seiya: Evil Goddess Eris (1987) (Narration)
- Five Star Stories (1989) (Balanche)
- Big Wars (1993) (Captain Akuh)
- Slam Dunk Series (1994–1995) (Kogure Kiminobu)
- X (1996) (Seiichirou Aoki)
- Vampire Hunter D: Bloodlust (2000) (D)
- One Piece: Nejimaki Shima no Bouken (2001) (Pin Joker)
- Detective Conan - The Phantom of Baker Street (2002) (Yūsaku Kudō, Sherlock Holmes)
- Paprika (2006) (Man in Konaka's Dream)
- Love Me, Love Me Not (2020)
- City Hunter: Angel Dust (2023) (Hideyuki Makimura)

=== Video games ===
- Forgotten Worlds (1992 PC Engine conversion of the original arcade) (Blue Soldier)
- Xenogears (1998) (Citan Uzuki)
- Metal Gear Solid (1998) (Otacon)
- Metal Gear Solid 2: Sons of Liberty (2001) (Otacon)
- Mr. Driller G (2001) (Dr. Manhole, Holinger-Z)
- Shaman King (2003) (Matamune)
- Tales of Symphonia (2003) (Mithos Yggdrasill)
- JoJo's Bizarre Adventure: Phantom Blood (2006) (Jonathan Joestar)
- Metal Gear Solid 4: Guns of the Patriots (2008) (Otacon, Jonathan)
- Metal Gear Solid: Peace Walker (2010) (Dr. "Huey" Emmerich)
- Dynasty Warriors 8 (2013) (Han Dang)
- Metal Gear Solid V: Ground Zeroes (2014) (Dr. "Huey" Emmerich)
- Metal Gear Solid V: The Phantom Pain (2015) (Dr. "Huey" Emmerich)
- World of Final Fantasy (2016) (Knight in the Golden Mask, Rorrik)

Unknown date

- Ace Combat 5: The Unsung War (Vincent Harling)
- Ace Combat Zero: The Belkan War (Reiner Altman)
- Angelique (Clavis)
- Ar tonelico III (Raphael)
- Kinnikuman Generations Series (Terryman/2nd Kinnikuman Great)
- Kinnikuman Muscle Grand Prix Max (Terryman, Springman, Planetman)
- Otome wa Boku ni Koishiteru (Yoshiyuki Kaburagi)
- Policenauts (Jonathan Ingram)
- Shadow Hearts (Jinpachiro Hyuga)
- Space Battleship Yamato Series (Daisuke Shima)
- Super Robot Wars series (Alan Igor, Gilliam Yeager, Jack Oliver)
- Xenosaga series (Jin Uzuki)

=== Live action ===
- The Red Spectacles (1987) (Sōichirō Toribe)

==== Tokusatsu ====
- ULTRAMAN (2004) (Ultraman The Next)
- Ultraman Mebius (2006) (Zoffy)
- Ultraman Mebius & Ultraman Brothers (2006) (Zoffy)
- Mega Monster Battle: Ultra Galaxy (2009) (Zoffy)
- Ultraman Zero: The Revenge of Belial (2010) (Zoffy)
- Ultraman Zero Side Story: Killer the Beatstar (2011) (Zoffy)
- Ultraman Retsuden/Shin Ultraman Retsuden (2012) (Zoffy (35, 39, 86-90/1))
- Ultra Fight Orb (2017) (Zoffy)
- Ultraman Geed the Movie (2018)
- X-Bomber (xxxx) (Officer A)

=== Drama CDs ===
- Chouai (????) (Seiichi Hagiawa)
- Hello!! Doctor (????) (Ryuuji Makimura)
- Katsuai series 1 (????) (Akito Morishima)
- Katsuai series 2: Bakuren (????) (Akito Morishima)
- Mirage of Blaze series 3: Konoyoruni Tsubasa wo (????) (Ujiteru Hōjō)
- Mirage of Blaze series 4: Washi yo, Tarega Tameni Tobu (????) (Ujiteru Hōjō)

=== Dubbing ===
==== Live-action ====
- Pierce Brosnan
  - The Lawnmower Man, Dr. Lawrence Angelo
  - GoldenEye (1999 TV Asahi edition), James Bond
  - Dante's Peak (2003 TV Asahi edition), Dr. Harry Dalton
  - Tomorrow Never Dies (2002 TV Asahi edition), James Bond
  - The Thomas Crown Affair (2003 Fuji TV edition), Thomas Crown
  - The World Is Not Enough (2003 TV Asahi edition), James Bond
  - Die Another Day (2006 TV Asahi edition), James Bond
  - After the Sunset (2009 TV Tokyo edition), Max Burdett
  - Mamma Mia!, Sam Carmichael
  - Some Kind of Beautiful, Richard Haig
  - The November Man, Peter Devereaux
  - No Escape, Hammond
  - Survivor, Nash "The Watchmaker"
  - I.T., Mike Regan
  - The Foreigner, Liam Hennessy
  - Mamma Mia! Here We Go Again, Sam Carmichael
  - Eurovision Song Contest: The Story of Fire Saga, Erick Ericksson
  - Black Adam, Kent Nelson / Doctor Fate
  - The Out-Laws, Billy McDermott
- Michael Biehn
  - The Terminator (1987 TV Asahi edition), Kyle Reese
  - Aliens (1989 and 1993 TV Asahi editions), Dwayne Hicks
  - Navy SEALs (1993 TV Asahi edition), James Curran
  - Asteroid (1997 TV Asahi edition), Jack Wallach
  - Dragon Squad, Petros Angelo
- Kevin Spacey
  - Seven (2001 TV Asahi edition), John Doe
  - The Usual Suspects (1998 TV Tokyo edition), Roger "Verbal" Kint
  - L.A. Confidential, Det. Sgt. Jack Vincennes
  - 21, Professor Micky Rosa
- All the Right Moves, Brian (Chris Penn)
- American Graffiti (1984 TBS edition), Steve Bolander (Ron Howard)
- Army of Darkness, Ash Williams (Bruce Campbell)
- Avengers: Endgame, Alexander Pierce (Robert Redford)
- Bullets Over Broadway, David Shayne (John Cusack)
- The Burning (1985 Fuji TV edition), Todd (Brian Matthews)
- Captain America: The Winter Soldier, Alexander Pierce (Robert Redford)
- Chariots of Fire (1985 TBS edition), Eric Liddell (Ian Charleson)
- Charlie St. Cloud, Florio Ferrente (Ray Liotta)
- CHiPs, John Baker (Larry Wilcox)
- Dom Hemingway, Dickie (Richard E. Grant)
- Florence and the Uffizi Gallery, Lorenzo il Magnifico (Simon Merrells)
- Get Smart (2011 TV Asahi edition), Krstic (David S. Lee)
- The Glenn Miller Story (2000 TV Tokyo edition), Glenn Miller (James Stewart)
- Green Card, Georges Fauré (Gérard Depardieu)
- The Jackal, Declan Joseph Mulqueen (Richard Gere)
- Joe Versus the Volcano, Joe Banks (Tom Hanks)
- Licence to Kill (VHS edition), James Bond (Timothy Dalton)
- The Man in the Iron Mask, Aramis (Jeremy Irons)
- NCIS, Leroy Jethro Gibbs (Mark Harmon)
- Nicky Larson and Cupid's Perfume, Tony Marconi (Raphaël Personnaz)
- Philadelphia, Andrew Beckett (Tom Hanks)
- The Quick and the Dead (1997 TV Asahi edition), Cort (Russell Crowe)
- Resident Evil: Apocalypse, Major Timothy Cain (Thomas Kretschmann)
- Schindler's List, Amon Göth (Ralph Fiennes)
- Tequila Sunrise, Lt. Nick Frescia (Kurt Russell)
- Thirteen Days (2003 TV Asahi edition), Robert McNamara (Dylan Baker)
- To Kill a Mockingbird (50th Anniversary edition), Atticus Finch (Gregory Peck)
- Unfinished Business, Dan Trunkman (Vince Vaughn)
- West Side Story (1990 TBS edition), Ice (Tucker Smith)

==== Animation ====
- The Beatles (George Harrison)
- Police Academy: The Animated Series (Capt. Thaddeus Harris)
