= Daniel Van Thomas =

American voice actor

- Born: Paducah, Kentucky, US
- Education: Murray State University
- Occupation: Voice actor
- Years active: 2010–present
- Notable credits: Ultraman Zero in the Ultraman franchise; Alger Wilson in Lord of Mysteries; Rhyno in Sentenced to Be a Hero; Aresh Indolark in Isekai Office Worker: The Other World's Books Depend on the Bean Counter
- Website: www.danielvanthomas.com

Daniel Van Thomas is an American actor, known for his voice work on English dubs of anime.

== Biography ==
Raised in Paducah, Kentucky, Van Thomas was fascinated by acting from a young age, but wasn't able to study it until he became the first of his family to attend college. He double majored in English creative writing and Theater acting, graduating from Murray State University in 2007.

After a year of salmon fishing, Van Thomas moved to Los Angeles and has pursued full time acting since.

Van Thomas uses he/they pronouns.

== Filmography ==
=== Television ===
==== Voice acting ====
List of voice performances in television
| Year | Title | Role | Notes | Ref. |
|---|---|---|---|---|
| 1999 | One Piece | Jibuemon | | |
| 2018 | That Time I Got Reincarnated as a Slime | Granville Rozzo (young) | | |
| 2023 | Shangri-La Frontier | Sakai Tsukuyogi | | |
| 2024 | Bucchigiri?! | Zabu Zakeru | | |
| 2024 | Bye Bye, Earth | Adonis | | |
| 2024 | Fairy Tail: 100 Years Quest | Gears, Rob | | |
| 2024 | Nina the Starry Bride | Dytus | | |
| 2024 | Delico's Nursery | Angelico Fra (adult) | | |
| 2024 | You Are Ms. Servant | Tatsu Hikage | | |
| 2025 | The Red Ranger Becomes an Adventurer in Another World | Male Morpher Voice | | |
| 2025 | Anyway, I'm Falling in Love with You | Yamamoto | | |
| 2025 | I Left My A-Rank Party to Help My Former Students Reach the Dungeon Depths! | Lucent | | |
| 2025 | To Be Hero X | Oliver | | |
| 2025 | Mobile Suit Gundam GQuuuuuuX | Wakkein, Gihren Zabi | | |
| 2025 | The Beginning After the End | Kaspian Bladeheart | | |
| 2025 | Even Given the Worthless "Appraiser Class," I'm Actually the Strongest | Shadow | | |
| 2025 | Lord of Mysteries | Alger Wilson | | |
| 2025 | Pass the Monster Meat, Milady! | Ghislain Dutor Marchalrayd | | |
| 2025 | With You and the Rain | Kumanomido | | |
| 2025 | The Banished Court Magician Aims to Become the Strongest | Eldas Mikayla | | |
| 2025 | Bogus Skill "Fruitmaster" | Grave Keeper | | |
| 2026 | Tamon's B-Side | Utage's father | | |
| 2026 | Sentenced to Be a Hero | Rhyno | | |
| 2026 | MF Ghost | Hayato | | |
| 2026 | Isekai Office Worker: The Other World's Books Depend on the Bean Counter | Aresh Indolark | | |
| 2026 | The Warrior Princess and the Barbaric King | Raham | | |
| 2026 | Drops of God | Ryuzo Saiki | | |
| 2026 | The Angel Next Door Spoils Me Rotten | Asahi Shiina | | |
| 2026 | Liar Game | Sho Kikuchi | | |
| 2026 | Overgeared | Ashur | | |
| 2026 | Psyren | Usui | | |
| 2026 | As a Reincarnated Aristocrat, I'll Use My Appraisal Skill to Rise in the World | Male narrator | | |

==== Live action ====
List of live-action performances in television
| Year | Title | Role | Notes | Ref. |
|---|---|---|---|---|
| 2015 | American Genius | Glenn Curtiss | | |
| 2021 | Wild West Chronicles | R.M. Hitchens | | |

=== Film ===
==== Voice acting ====
List of voice performances in film
| Year | Title | Role | Notes | Ref. |
|---|---|---|---|---|
| 2017 | Ultraman X The Movie | Ultraman Zero | William Winckler Productions dub | |
| 2017 | Ultraman Ginga S The Movie | Ultraman Zero | William Winckler Productions dub | |
| 2020 | Psycho-Pass 3: First Inspector | Koichiro Nomura | | |
| 2021 | Mega Monster Battle: Ultra Galaxy | Ultraman Zero | William Winckler Productions dub | |
| 2021 | Ultraman Zero: The Revenge of Belial | Ultraman Zero, Darklops | William Winckler Productions dub | |
| 2021 | Ultraman Saga | Ultraman Zero | William Winckler Productions dub | |
| 2024 | Beauty and the Warrior | Bartara Kandra | | |
| 2025 | Chainsaw Man – The Movie: Reze Arc | Mysterious man | | |
| tba | Mega Monster Battle: Ultra Galaxy | Rei / Reimon | Tsuburaya Productions dub, pending release | |
| tba | Ultraman Zero: The Revenge of Belial | Rei / Reimon | Tsuburaya Productions dub, pending release | |
| tba | Ultraman Saga | Rei / Reimon | Tsuburaya Productions dub, pending release | |

==== Live action ====
List of live action performances in film
| Year | Title | Role | Notes | Ref. |
|---|---|---|---|---|
| 2009 | Bloody Thursday | Ed Thayne | | |
| 2014 | Revelation Trail | The Preacher | Lead role | |
| 2026 | Mantis | Bill Berens | Lead role | |

=== Video games ===
List of voice performances in video games
| Year | Title | Role | Notes | Ref. |
|---|---|---|---|---|
| 2010 | Red Dead Redemption | Bert Venter | | |
| 2014 | Smite | Phantom Seas Poseidon | | |
| 2019 | Punishing: Gray Raven | Fu Shen | | |
| 2020 | Wasteland 3 | Charley Knowes | | |
| 2021 | Naraka: Bladepoint | Xunhaun Li | | |
| 2025 | Tainted Grail: The Fall of Avalon | Gavrel | | |
| 2025 | Rune Factory: Guardians of Azuma | Sakaki | | |
