= Ultraman Saga =

- Directed by: Hideki Oka
- Written by: Keiichi Hasegawa
- Produced by: Tsuburaya Productions
- Starring: DAIGO; Takeshi Tsuruno; Taiyo Sugiura
- Cinematography: Sou Takahashi
- Edited by: Akira Matsuki
- Music by: Fumio Hara
- Distributed by: Shochiku
- Release date: March 24, 2012
- Running time: 90 minutes
- Country: Japan
- Language: Japanese
- Box office: $6.1 million

Ultraman Saga (ウルトラマンサーガ, Urutoraman Sāga) is a 2012 Japanese tokusatsu, superhero and kaiju film in the Ultra Series to commemorate the franchise's 45th anniversary. It serves as a sequel to Ultraman Zero: The Revenge of Belial. The catchphrase for the movie is "We Still Have Glittering Hope!!" (僕らにはまだ、輝く希望がある!!, Bokura ni wa Mada, Kagayaku Kibō ga Aru!!). The film features Ultraman Zero, Ultraman Dyna, and Ultraman Cosmos as well as the five Ultra Brothers facing a new ultimate threat, Hyper Zetton (ハイパーゼットン, Haipā Zetton) and the Kaiju army created by the evil Alien Bat (バット星人, Batto Seijin). The film also features a new Ultraman known as Ultraman Saga (ウルトラマンサーガ, Urutoraman Sāga). The movie is set in the world of Ultraman Dyna, taking place 15 years after the series and features much of the supporting cast returning. A selection of members from the idol group AKB48 has been chosen to portray the characters of Team-U, a special Kaiju attack team part of the fictional Earth Defense Force.

In its first week in theaters, Ultraman Saga opened at the #4 spot in the Japanese box offices, about 166,006 people in 369 screens with a budget of ¥143,747,300.

== Plot ==
The film opens with a powerful apocalyptic vision of Tokyo, buildings destroyed and the city seemingly devoid of life. We are soon introduced to the Earth Defense Force (EDF), Team U (played by members of the female idol group AKB48), who go on a shopping raid in a desolate store in the city. During their raid, Team U is attacked by a Arstron. Despite their setup traps and weapons assisting them, they are no match for the Kaiju. As the Kaiju rampages, Ultraman Dyna appears and quickly destroys Arstron.

Meanwhile, in the alternate universe in which he defeated Ultraman Belial, Ultraman Zero receives a distress call from an unknown voice as he is battling a hoard of Legionoids and proceeds into the multiverse after making quick work of the robots. Upon arriving to the universe where he received the distress signal, he goes towards the Earth in aid, which is revealed to be the same universe in while Ultraman Dyna took place. Shortly before Zero departs, the hosts and Human forms of Ultraman, Seven, Jack, Ace and Leo comment on something unusual taking place in the multiverse, referring to the universe in which Zero is headed for.

Taking place 15 years after Shin Asuka (Ultraman Dyna) disappeared through a black hole at the series's ending, Earth has since then set up a space station on Mars in Asuka's honor and memory. The space station is then attacked by a few Granspheres, only for the invaders to quickly be fended off by a young defense team pilot named Taiga. Shortly after recklessly pursuing the Granspheres, Taiga is trapped (along with a few other Granspheres) inside of a Fortress-like Ship of an invading alien force, that quickly disappears.

Taiga soon finds himself in the apocalyptic version of Tokyo, as Ultraman Zero battles the fleet of spaceships that were released by the Fortress. As Taiga notices a crashing ship heading straight towards a young boy, he pilots his ship directly into its path in an act of self-sacrifice. Witnessing his brave actions, Ultraman Zero rescues Taiga and joins with him. Once Taiga reawakens, he discovers that Ultraman Zero saved him and is not happy to be joined with the Ultra. Trying to dismiss and expel the Ultra from his body, Taiga and the boy are attacked by a Gubila. As Taiga tries to keep the boy and himself from getting harmed, Gubila is confronted by another Ultraman, Ultraman Cosmos. After a relatively short fight, Cosmos manages to calm down Gubila and the Kaiju leaves the deserted city peacefully.

Shortly after encountering Ultraman Cosmos's human host, Musashi Haruno, both Ultras and the boy named Takeru are picked by Team U and taken to their base, which is revealed to be a warehouse full of children. Taiga and Musashi learn that Team U and the children are the last survivors on planet Earth after the world was invaded by an evil alien known as Alien Bat, who was revealed to have abducted all life on Earth, including nearly the entire human population. Shortly after the introductions, Alien Bat reveals himself to the survivors and unleashes Gubila and a Gomess to attack them. With the help of Ultraman Cosmos and Ultraman Zero (the latter being only 5 meters tall due to Taiga's stubborn participation), the Kaijus are turned gentle once again, only to be murdered in cold blood by Alien Bat for failing him. Alien Bat then announces to the survivors that they will all be killed by his greatest weapon: Zetton.

As Taiga and Musashi bond with Team U and the children, it is revealed that the reason for Taiga's general dislike towards Ultraman is due to his parents being killed by accident during one of Ultraman Dyna's fights against a Kaiju, thus forcing him to live a very lonely lifestyle growing up. It is also revealed by Team U that Ultraman Dyna and his human host Asuka had once stayed with the team and protected them, but was lost in battle against Alien Bat's Zetton. The next day Alien Bat reveals his customized Zetton and what remains of Ultraman Dyna, who has been turned to stone. With his creation complete, Alien Bat unleashes Zetton onto Team U and the survivors, destroying their shelter and leaving them all in despair. In their depression, Team U is exposed as being frauds, not associated with Earth's Defense Force but instead are a group of amateur mechanics who took it upon themselves to protect the surviving children by lying to them. Touched by Team U's bravery, and now realizing the seriousness of the situation this Earth is in, Taiga sets aside his differences with Ultraman and transforms into Ultraman Zero, where he and Cosmos head off to destroy Zetton.

Arriving at the Zetton's birthplace, Zero and Cosmos manage to hold off against the monster, but Alien Bat's Zetton is too big in size and strength for the combined Ultras to stop him. During the crossfire Cosmos is knocked out of commission, leaving Zero to face the Zetton by himself. With the Ultra fighting Zetton, Team U and Takeru arrive to help him when Takeru digs up the object that can revive Ultraman Dyna, Dyna's Reflasher. Despite some interference by Zetton, the Reflasher reunites with the statue of Dyna and Ultraman Dyna is revived to assist Zero and Cosmos, (whom had been revived by Dyna and Zero) in destroying Alien Bat's Zetton. However just as it seems the Zetton has been defeated, Alien Bat merges both his fortress and himself with the remains of the Zetton to reveal his creation's true form: Hyper Zetton.

Now with enhanced speed and power, Hyper Zetton easily defeats the three Ultras, leaving the group of heroes hopeless in stopping the crazed alien and his weapon. Unwilling to give up their home and the lives of their friends, Taiga, Musashi, and Asuka merge to form a new Ultraman known as "Ultraman Saga". Ultraman Saga confronts Hyper Zetton, but both Ultra and Monster's abilities are evenly matched with both combatants unable to best each other. Motivated by the Ultra, Team U assists Saga when the battle is taken to the deserted city. Leading Hyper Zetton to a trap that was set for Arstron, Ultraman Saga takes advantage of the distraction by slicing off Hyper Zetton's wings, the source of Hyper Zetton's abilities. With Hyper Zetton crippled, Ultraman Saga takes the monster into the Earth's Atmosphere and finally destroys it and Alien Bat with an energy-powered punch.

With Alien Bat and his Zetton destroyed, all those abducted by the alien return to Earth to live their lives in peace. The children reunite with their parents, Musashi returns to his home planet on Juran, Asuka returns to his home dimension briefly to inform his old teammates on Taiga's status and says that he will wait for them catch up to him before resuming his journey through space, and Taiga remains on Earth to live with Team U. Feeling confident that Taiga is ready to protect the Earth with Team U, Ultraman Zero separates from him and returns to his own universe.

== Cast ==
- Nozomu Taiga (タイガ・ノゾム, Taiga Nozomu): DAIGO
- Shin Asuka (アスカ・シン, Asuka Shin): Takeshi Tsuruno (つるの 剛士, Tsuruno Takeshi)
- Musashi Haruno (春野 ムサシ, Haruno Musashi): Taiyo Sugiura (杉浦 太陽, Sugiura Taiyō)
- Team U: AKB48
  - Anna Ozaki (尾崎 杏奈, Ozaki Anna): Sayaka Akimoto (秋元 才加, Akimoto Sayaka)
  - Misato Houshou (放生 ミサト, Hosho Misato): Ayaka Umeda (梅田 彩佳, Umeda Ayaka)
  - Sawa (サワ) Sawako Takayama (高山 咲和子, Takayama Sawako): Sae Miyazawa (宮澤 佐江, Miyazawa Sae)
  - Nonko (ノンコ): Yuka Masuda (増田 有華, Masuda Yuka)
  - Lisa Ozaki (尾崎 リーサ, Ozaki Rīsa): Sumire Sato (佐藤 すみれ, Satō Sumire)
  - Maomi (マオミ): Kana Kobayashi (小林 香菜, Kobayashi Kana)
  - Hina (ヒナ): Haruka Shimada (島田 晴香, Shimada Haruka)
- Takeru (タケル): Ryoma Takamura (高村 竜馬, Takamura Ryōma)
- Saaya (サーヤ, Sāya): Sayaka Ikeda (池田 沙弥花, Ikeda Sayaka)
- Ritsu (リツ): Ritsu Ohashi (大橋 律, Ōhashi Ritsu)
- Miko (ミコ): Sorami Watanabe (渡邉 空美, Watanabe Sorami)
- Ren (レン): Karen Ueno (上野 楓恋, Ueno Karen)
- Ken (ケン): Kengo Ando (安藤 健悟, Andō Kengo)
- Hiro (ヒロ): Hiromu Satomura (里村 洋, Satomura Hiromu)
- Kuu (クー, Kū): Kurea Mori (森 くれあ, Mori Kurea)
- Kanata (カナタ): Kanau Tanaka (田中 奏生, Tanaka Kanau)
- Takeru's mother: Shion Nakamaru (中丸 シオン, Nakamaru Shion)
- Young Nozomu Taiga: Mitsumasa Sato (佐藤 光将, Satō Mitsumasa)
- Toshiyuki Kohda (コウダ・トシユキ, Kōda Toshiyuki): Toshikazu Fukawa (布川 敏和, Fukawa Toshikazu)
- Ryo Yumimura (ユミムラ・リョウ, Yumimura Ryō): Risa Saito (斉藤 りさ, Saitō Risa)
- Kouhei Kariya (カリヤ・コウヘイ, Kariya Kōhei): Takao Kase (加瀬 尊朗, Kase Takao)
- Tsutomu Nakajima (ナカジマ・ツトム, Nakajima Tsutomu): Joe Onodera (小野寺 丈, Onodera Jō)
- Gousuke Hibiki (ヒビキ・ゴウスケ, Hibiki Gōsuke): Ryo Kinomoto (木之元 亮, Kinomoto Ryō)
- Ayano Haruno (春野 綾乃, Haruno Ayano): Mayuka Suzuki (鈴木 繭菓, Suzuki Mayuka)
- Sora Haruno (春野 ソラ, Haruno Sora): Ryu Hashizume (橋爪 龍, Hashizume Ryū)
- Shin Hayata (ハヤタ・シン, Hayata Shin): Susumu Kurobe (黒部 進, Kurobe Susumu)
- Dan Moroboshi (モロボシ・ダン, Moroboshi Dan): Kohji Moritsugu (森次 晃嗣, Moritsugu Kōji)
- Hideki Go (郷 秀樹, Gō Hideki): Jiro Dan (団 時郎, Dan Jirō)
- Seiji Hokuto (北斗 星司, Hokuto Seiji): Keiji Takamine (高峰 圭二, Takamine Keiji)
- Gen Otori (おおとり ゲン, Ōtori Gen): Ryu Manatsu (真夏 竜, Manatsu Ryū)
- Ultraman Zero (ウルトラマンゼロ, Urutoraman Zero; Voice): Mamoru Miyano (宮野 真守, Miyano Mamoru)
- Ultraman Cosmos (ウルトラマンコスモス, Urutoraman Kosumosu; Voice): Yūki Satō (佐藤 ゆうき, Satō Yūki)
- Alien Bat (バット星人, Batto Seijin; Voice): Hideo Higashikokubaru (東国原 英夫, Higashikokubaru Hideo)

=== English dub actors ===
- Justin Andrews as Nozomu Taiga
- Bryan Forrest as Shin Asuka/Ultraman Dyna
- Paul Stanko as Musashi Haruno/Ultraman Cosmos
- Daniel Van Thomas as Ultraman Zero
- Linnea Sage as Anna
- Sarah Jenks as Misato
- Lexi Eiserman as Sawa
- Theresa Croft as Nonko
- Elyse Bertani as Lisa
- Annie Knudsen as Maomi
- Adam Sartain as Alien Bat
- William Knight as Ultraman
- G. Larry Butler as Ultraseven
- Brad Potts as Ultraman Jack
- Frank Gerrish as Ultraman Ace
- Phil Miler as Ultraman Leo
- Kent Shocknek as Captain Hibiki
- Lisle Wilkerson as Captain Yumimura
- William Winckler as Lieutenant Kariya
- Linda Weinrib as Mother

== Ultraman Zero Gaiden ==
To promote the film, two special DVDs have been released to lead up to the storyline of the film titled Ultraman Zero Gaiden: Killer the Beatstar (ウルトラマンゼロ外伝 キラー ザ ビートスター, Urutoraman Zero Gaiden: Kirā za Bītosutā). Shota Minami, Hiroyuki Konishi, Mitsutoshi Shundo, and Tao Tsuchiya reprise their roles from Ultra Galaxy Mega Monster Battle, Never Ending Odyssey, Mega Monster Battle: Ultra Galaxy, and Ultraman Zero: The Revenge of Belial in these DVDs. The film also features Jean-Killer (ジャンキラー, Jan Kirā; voiced by Miyu Irino), who turns to good and becomes renamed Jean-Nine (ジャンナイン, Jan Nain), created based on Jean-Bot by the evil Beatstar (ビートスター, Bītosutā; voiced by Unshō Ishizuka), the primary antagonist.

Stages

1. Universe of Steel (鋼鉄の宇宙, Kōtetsu no Uchū) - November 25, 2011
2. Pledge of the Meteor (流星の誓い, Ryūsei no Chikai) - December 22, 2011

== Reception ==
Ultraman Saga earned $6.1 million at the Japanese box office.

== Songs ==
Main theme

- "Lost the way"
  - Lyrics: Yasushi Akimoto (秋元 康, Akimoto Yasushi)
  - Composition: Yoshifumi Kouchi (小内 喜文, Kouchi Yoshifumi)
  - Arrangement: D.L.M.
  - Artist: DiVA

Insert theme

- "Kimi dake o Mamoritai ~Asuka no Uta~" (君だけを守りたい ～アスカの歌～; "You Alone I Want to Protect ~Asuka's Song~")
  - Lyrics, Composition & Arrangement: Toshihiko Takamizawa (高見沢 俊彦, Takamizawa Toshihiko)
  - Artist: Takeshi Tsuruno
