= Taiyo Sugiura =

Japanese actor (born 1981)

- 杉浦 太陽
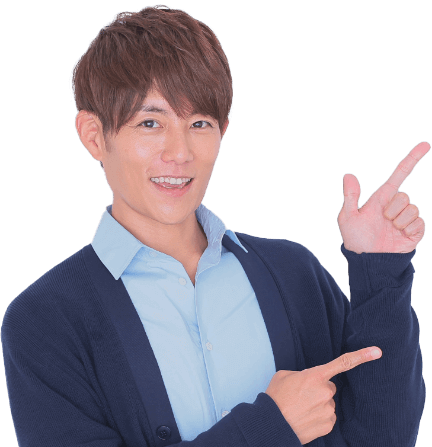
- Born: Takayasu Sugiura (杉浦 太陽); 10 March 1981 (age 45); Okayama, Japan
- Education: Osaka Sangyo University Senior High School - (High school diploma, 1999)
- Occupation: Actor
- Years active: 1998–present
- Partner: Nozomi Tsuji (m. 2007)
- Children: 5

Taiyo Sugiura (杉浦 太陽, Sugiura Taiyō) (born March 10, 1981) is a Japanese actor.

== Early life ==
Sugiura was born in Okayama, Japan. He has a brother, Takao (太雄), who is two years younger. Sugiura attended Neyagawa 1st Junior High School (Neyagawa Middle School) and Osaka Sangyo University Senior High School, where he graduated from in 1999.

== Career ==
Sugiura made his debut in 1998 with TV Asahi, where he appeared in several dramas. In 2001, he was cast in and starred for Ultraman Cosmos. This was followed by his appearance in the 2003 Ultraman Cosmos vs. Ultraman Justice: The Final Battle.

== Personal life ==
On June 17, 2007, Sugiura married Nozomi Tsuji while she was three months pregnant; the marriage was confirmed to be a shotgun wedding. Sugiura and Tsuji met in April 2006 through mutual friends. The couple have five children, two daughters and three sons. Beginning in 2024, their eldest daughter Noa Sugiura has gained fame in Japan as a social media influencer.

== Filmography ==
Year	Title	Role	Notes
2001-2002	Ultraman Cosmos	Musashi Haruno	65 episodes
2001	Waterboys	Taiyô	
2002	Ultraman Cosmos 2: The Blue Planet	Musashi Haruno / Ultraman Cosmos	
2003	Ultraman Cosmos vs. Ultraman Justice: The Final Battle	Musashi Haruno / Ultraman Cosmos	
2005	Beat Kids	Takumi	
2005	Naniwa kin'yû-dô: Haibara shôbu! Kishikaisei no otoshimae!!	Tatsuyuki Haibara	
2005	Shinkaijû Reigô		
2007	0 kara no kaze		
2007	Academy		
2008	Tora kone: Toraianguru konekushon		
2009	Mega Monster Battle: Ultra Galaxy	Musashi Haruno	
2011	Maebashi vijuaru kei		
2012	Ultraman Saga	Musashi Haruno / Ultraman Cosmos	
2015	Ultraman Ginga S: Showdown! Ultra 10 Warriors!!	Musashi Haruno / Ultraman Cosmos	
2016-2017	Ultraman Orb: The Origin Saga	Musashi Haruno / Ultraman Cosmos	
2020	Ultra Galaxy Fight: The Absolute Conspiracy	Ultraman Cosmos	
2021	Nobutora	Ichijō Nobutatsu	
2022	Ultra Galaxy Fight: The Destined Crossroad	Ultraman Cosmos (voice)	Prologue
