= Mega Monster Battle: Ultra Galaxy =

Mega Monster Battle: Ultra Galaxy Legend the Movie
- Promotional poster
- Directed by: Koichi Sakamoto
- Written by: Junya Okabe, Tatsuro Kashihara, Yūji Kobayashi
- Produced by: Tsuburaya Productions
- Starring: Shota Minami; Susumu Kurobe; Kohji Moritsugu; Hiroyuki Konishi; Shunji Igarashi
- Cinematography: Takumi Furuya
- Edited by: Daisuke Imai
- Music by: Mike Verta
- Distributed by: Warner Bros. Pictures
- Release date: December 12, 2009
- Running time: 96 minutes
- Country: Japan
- Language: Japanese
- Box office: $6.1 million

Mega Monster Battle: Ultra Galaxy Legend (大怪獣バトル ウルトラ銀河伝説 The Movie, Daikaijū Batoru Urutora Ginga Densetsu Za Mūbī; lit. Mega Monster Battle: Ultra Galaxy Legends The Movie) is a 2009 Japanese superhero film in the Ultra Series. The film released in theaters on December 12, 2009, by Warner Bros. Entertainment Japan. The catchphrase for the movie is "Recover the light of the galaxy!!" (取り戻せ!!銀河の光, Torimodose!! Ginga no hikari). The film is also referred to as Large Monster: The Ultra Milky Way Legend. The film went on to gross $6,161,665 and become the second highest grossing Ultraman movie behind the previous year's entry. It is the first film directed by Koichi Sakamoto, marking the debut of Ultraman Zero and Ultraman Belial.

The film itself was preceded by Ultraman Mebius Side Story: Ghost Reverse, a direct-to-video special from Ultraman Mebius which led to the movie's plot, and followed by a sequel Ultraman Zero: The Revenge of Belial in 2010.

Mega Monster Battle: Ultra Galaxy also marks Takeshi Aono's final role prior to his retirement and his death in 2012.

== Plot ==
After defeating a Bemular on a desert-like moon, Ultraman Mebius returns to his home planet Ultra, also known as Land of Light in Nebula M78, where he is reunited with Ultraman, Zoffy, and Ultraseven. Outside Ultra's orbit in the Space Prison, also known as the Belial Prison, Alien Zarab assumes the guise of an Imitation Ultraman to subdue the guards before using the Giga Battlenizer to release the prison's only occupant: The evil Ultraman known as Ultraman Belial. While Zarab is expecting an alliance, Belial kills the alien and takes back his Giga Battlenizer as he is confronted by a squadron of Ultras led by Ultraman Taro to contain him. But Belial overpowers them while proceeding to overpower every able-bodied Ultra in the Land of Light, including his former friends Ultraman Ken (Father of Ultra) and his wife Ultrawoman Marie (Mother of Ultra), as he makes his way to the Plasma Spark Tower to take the Plasma Spark which keeps the planet alive. As the planet begins freezing over, Ultraman and Ultraseven shield themselves at the last moment, Taro protects the last fragment of light to prevent the planet's complete demise. As Belial flies off, having knocked the younger Ultraman off the planet during his rampage, Mebius returns to find his world a frozen wasteland while Ultraman and Ultraseven instruct Mebius to seek out the Reionics Rei.

Following their battle against Alien Reiblood, the ZAP Spacy group have arrived on the Earth-like Planet known as Dent where Rei and his Gomora have just defeated a Zaragas when Mebius spirits Rei and appears in the form of his human guise Mirai Hibino. Mirai tells Rei the genesis of Planet Ultra: How the Plasma Spark was initially created to replace M78's collapsing sun and it caused the evolution of the residential advanced human populace into Ultramen who used their powers to protect worlds from Kaijus also created by the radiation. But Belial was an exception, his temptation to gain more power from the Plasma Spark resulted in his banishment when he nearly endangered the planet. Belial ended up encountering Alien Reiblood, who fused into the Ultraman's body and further corrupted him into an Ultraman-Reionics. Belial used his ability to control hundreds of Kaijus with the Giga Battlenizer to raid the Land of Light in what came to be known Belial Revolt, nearly conquering the planet before being defeated and imprisoned in the newly created Space Prison by Ultraman King while his weapon was sealed away in the Valley of Fire before it was found by Zarab. Rei agrees to aid the Ultraman in facing Belial, who has arrived to the Monster Graveyard to resurrect his army with the Plasma Spark's power.

Rei and Mirai soon land on the frozen surface of the Land of Light and they are ambushed on their journey to the Plasma Spark Tower by an Alien Shaplay that Belial sent with a Dorako, a Bemstar, and a Salamandora to intercept them. During the fight, Mirai's Mebium Brace is damaged by the Shaplay and Rei nearly loses his Battlenizer, but Ultraman, assuming a human form modeled after his host Shin Hayata, and Ultraseven in his Dan Moroboshi guise come to the youths' aid as the later uses his Capsule Kaijus Windom, Miclas, and Agira to defeat the Shaplay's monsters. On the way to the tower, it is revealed there is another Ultraman who can assist but Ultraseven reveals that person was also exiled from the Land of Light. When the group arrive at the tower, they find themselves facing a now-revenge-driven Shaplay while Rei and Gomora face a Black King. Once their opposition is dispatched, Taro gives the three Ultramen the last of the Plasma Spark's light to assume their Ultraman forms in a last-ditch attempt to reclaim the Plasma Spark from Belial. Meanwhile, on a desert planet after almost touching the Plasma Spark when stopped by Ultraseven, the Ultraman known as Zero undergoes training by Ultraman Leo in training armor while observed by Ultraman King.

Once at the Kaiju Graveyard, the Ultramen and Rei's Kaijus battle Belial's army with Belial sensing kinship in Rei as he pressures the human to join him. When Rei refuses again, Belial uses his power to force the human into his Burst Mode and under Belial's control. Gomora assumes Reionic Burst Mode as he proceeds to attack the Ultramen with Ultraseven mortally wounded. Elsewhere in the universe, the ZAP Spacy crew are searching for Rei before they are saved from an ambush by a Nurse and its Alien Zetton wrangler by Ultraman Dyna who agrees to take them to the Kaiju Graveyard after they learn of Rei's location from the Zetton. Dyna attempts to fight Belial while the ZAP Spacy crew snaps Rei out of his Burst Mode. After brushing off Dyna, Belial attempts to kill the humans with Ultraseven taking the lethal attack before using the last of his strength to send his Eye Slugger to the desert planet where Zero is training. The crest-blade reaches the planet just after Zero passed Leo's test when he saved the life of a Pigmon that was observing them. Both Leo and Ultraman King inform Zero that he saved the life of someone, the purpose of being an Ultraman, and they finally reveal to him that Ultraseven is his father and that his actions were to prevent Zero from taking the path Belial took. Casting aside his training armor while using his father's Eye Slugger as a homing device, Zero reaches the Kaiju Graveyard and introduces himself as Ultraman Zero.

After Ultraseven dies in his arms, an infuriated Zero defeats the remaining Kaijus of Belial's Kaiju Army before battling the evil Ultraman himself. After a long and vicious battle, Zero disarms Belial of the Giga Battlenizer and knocks him into a river of molten lava. But the souls of Belial's Kaijus converge on their master and form a massive exosuit-like Kaiju called Belyudra which Belial has overpower the Ultramen. But Rei uses the Giga Battlenizer to disrupt Belial's hold over the Kaijus, leaving Belyudra open to attack while Zero uses the Plasma Spark's energy to give him enough power to end Belial as he falls into Belyudra as it explodes. After the Plasma Spark is restored to its rightful place, the ZAP Spacy crew become the first humans to ever set foot on the Land of Light as they bid their goodbyes to Ultraman and Mebius as Dyna decides to accompany them a bit longer as his human host Shin Asuka. As Zero is reunited with a revived Ultraseven, the Ultras attend a moving speech by Ultraman King to remain ready for future threats that would threaten the universe. Back in the Kaiju Graveyard, a scarred Belial is revealed to have survived the destruction of Belyudra.

== Production and casting ==
Susumu Kurobe, of the original Ultraman, and Kohji Moritsugu, of the original Ultraseven, returned to the film, as did Takeshi Tsuruno of Dyna, Taiyou Sugiura of Cosmos, Shunji Igarashi of Mebius, and Shota Minami of Ultra Galaxy. The film was directed by Koichi Sakamoto, the action director for the production of Power Rangers in New Zealand. In addition to voice actor Mamoru Miyano voicing the new Ultraman Zero, former Prime Minister of Japan Junichiro Koizumi provided the voice for Ultraman King. To promote the movie and Windows 7, a special event was staged with Ultra Seven and his son Ultraman Zero alongside Microsoft employees.

== Cast ==
- Rei (レイ): Shota Minami (南 翔太, Shōta Minami)
- Shin Hayata (ハヤタ・シン, Hayata Shin), Ultraman (ウルトラマン, Urutoraman; Voice): Susumu Kurobe (黒部 進, Kurobe Susumu)
- Dan Moroboshi (モロボシ・ダン, Moroboshi Dan), Ultraseven (ウルトラセブン, Urutorasebun; Voice): Kohji Moritsugu (森次 晃嗣, Moritsugu Kōji)
- Hyuga (ヒュウガ, Hyūga): Hiroyuki Konishi (小西 博之, Konishi Hiroyuki)
- Haruna (ハルナ): Saki Kamiryo (上良 早紀, Kamiryō Saki)
- Kumano (クマノ): Mitsutoshi Shundo (俊藤 光利, Shundō Mitsutoshi)
- Oki (オキ): Toru Hachinohe (八戸 亮, Hachinohe Tōru)
- Musashi Haruno (春野 ムサシ, Haruno Musashi): Taiyo Sugiura (杉浦 太陽, Sugiura Taiyō)
- Shin Asuka (アスカ・シン, Asuka Shin), Ultraman Dyna (ウルトラマンダイナ, Urutoraman Daina; Voice): Takeshi Tsuruno (つるの 剛士, Tsuruno Takeshi)
- Mirai Hibino (ヒビノ・ミライ, Hibino Mirai), Ultraman Mebius (ウルトラマンメビウス, Urutoraman Mebiusu; Voice): Shunji Igarashi (五十嵐 隼士, Igarashi Shunji)
- Residents of the Land of Light: Mamoru Uchiyama (内山 まもる, Uchiyama Mamoru), Satoshi Furuya (古谷 敏, Furuya Satoshi)
- Alien Pressure (プレッシャー星人, Puresshā Seijin): Takashi Okamura (岡村 隆史, Okamura Takashi)
- Ultraman Belial (ウルトラマンベリアル, Urutoraman Beriaru; Voice): Hiroyuki Miyasako (宮迫 博之, Miyasako Hiroyuki)
- Ultraman Zero (ウルトラマンゼロ, Urutoraman Zero; Voice): Mamoru Miyano (宮野 真守, Miyano Mamoru)
- Ultraman Jack (ウルトラマンジャック, Urutoraman Jakku; Voice): Jiro Dan (団 時郎, Dan Jirō)
- Ultraman Ace (ウルトラマンエース, Urutoraman Ēsu; Voice): Keiji Takamine (高峰 圭二, Takamine Keiji)
- Ultraman Leo (ウルトラマンレオ, Urutoraman Reo; Voice): Ryu Manatsu (真夏 竜, Manatsu Ryū)
- Ultraman 80 (ウルトラマン80, Urutoraman Eiti; Voice): Osamu Yamamoto (山本 修, Yamamoto Osamu)
- Zoffy (ゾフィー, Zofī; Voice): Hideyuki Tanaka (田中 秀幸, Tanaka Hideyuki)
- Ultraman Taro (ウルトラマンタロウ, Urutoraman Tarō; Voice): Hiroya Ishimaru (石丸 博也, Ishimaru Hiroya)
- Ultraman Hikari (ウルトラマンヒカリ, Urutoraman Hikari; Voice): Keiichi Nanba (難波 圭一, Nanba Keiichi)
- Alien Zarab/Fake Ultraman (ザラブ星人／にせウルトラマン, Zarabu Seijin/Nise Urutoraman; Voice): Takeshi Aono (青野 武, Aono Takeshi)
- Mother of Ultra (ウルトラの母, Urutora no Haha; Voice): Rie Hasegawa (長谷川 理恵, Hasegawa Rie)
- Alien Zetton (ゼットン星人, Zetton Seijin; Voice): Daisuke Nagakura (永倉 大輔, Nagakura Daisuke)
- Alien Shaplay (シャプレー星人, Shapurē Seijin; Voice): Taiyo Kawashita (川下 大洋, Kawashita Taiyō)
- Alien Reiblood (レイブラッド星人, Reiburaddo Seijin; Voice): Masahiro Chono (蝶野 正洋, Chōno Masahiro)
- Father of Ultra (ウルトラの父, Urutora no Chichi; Voice): Tokuma Nishioka (西岡 徳馬, Nishioka Tokuma)
- Ultraman King (ウルトラマンキング, Urutoraman Kingu; Voice): Former Prime Minister Junichiro Koizumi (小泉 純一郎, Koizumi Jun'ichirō)
- Battlenizer (バトルナイザー, Batorunaizā; Voice): Hideyuki Hori (堀 秀行, Hori Hideyuki)
- Narration: Masaaki Yajima (矢島 正明, Yajima Masaaki)

=== William Winckler Productions English dub Cast ===
- Paul Stanko as Rei/Reimon
- William Knight as Shin Hayata/Ultraman
- G. Larry Butler as Dan Moroboshi/Ultraseven
- Frank Gerrish as Captain Hyuga
- Valerie Rose Lohman as Haruna
- Michael Kunselman as Kumano
- Josh Madson as Oki
- John Katona as Mirai Hibino/Ultraman Mebius
- Beau Marie as Ultraman Belial
- Daniel Van Thomas as Ultraman Zero
- Bryan Forrest as Shin Asuka/Ultraman Dyna
- Phil Miler as Ultraman Leo
- Robert Axelrod as Ultraman King
- Brad Potts as Ultraman Jack
- Kyle Rea as Ultraman 80
- William Winckler as Ultraman Taro
- Lisle Wilkerson as Mother of Ultra
- Mark Chinnery as Researcher
- Jay Dee Witney as Ultra Guard
- Kent Shocknek as Battlenizer
- Adam Sartain as Narrator

=== Okratron 5000 ===
- Daniel Van Thomas as Rei/Reimon
- Sonny Strait as Shin Hayata/Ultraman
- Christopher Sabat as Dan Moroboshi/Ultraseven
- Brent Mukai as Captain Hyuga
- Hannah Alyea as Haruna
- Yung-I Chang as Kumano
- Ben Stegmair as Oki
- Ben Balmaceda as Mirai Hibino/Ultraman Mebius
- Patrick Seitz as Ultraman Belial
- Sean Schemmel as Ultraman Zero
- Ryan Negron as Shin Asuka/Ultraman Dyna
- Brook Chalmers as Ultraman Leo
- Jay Hickman as Astra
- Keith Silverstein as Ultraman Jack
- Charles Campbell as Ultraman Ace
- Jim Foronda as Ultraman Taro
- Chris Hackney as Zoffy
- Jalen K. Cassell as Ultraman 80 and Alien Reiblood
- Cris George as Father of Ultra
- Lisa Ortiz as Mother of Ultra
- Steven Kelly as Ultraman King
- Ryan Colt Levy as Ultraman Hikari
- Bryson Baugus as Musashi
- Ryan Elizabeth Reynolds as Ultraman Boy
- Kellen Goff as Alien Zarab
- Bill Butts as Alien Shaplay
- Austin Sisk as Alien Zetton
- Charles Martinet as the Narrator

== Theme song ==
- "Hoshi no Yō ni..." (星のように...; lit. "Like the Stars...")
  - Composition: Sinkiroh
  - Arrangement: Tohru Shigemi (重実 徹, Shigemi Tōru)
  - Lyrics & Artist: MISIA

Japanese R&B singer MISIA performs the film's theme song, with its music video featuring MISIA, Ultraman, Alien Baltan, Dada, Pigmon, and Alien Metron. The single is sold as both a standard edition containing just the CD single and a limited edition which includes the CD single and a gold-colored statuette of a caped Ultraman. The other tracks on the single are the remix "Hoshi no Yō ni... (Gomi's Ultra Legend Club Mix)" which includes Ultraman vocals and the song "ULTRA X'MAS". The song is also featured on her album Just Ballade while the remix is included on the album for the film's original soundtrack, score composed by Mike Verta.

== Reception ==
The film earned $6.1 million at the Japanese box office. On Rotten Tomatoes, 81% on the positive rate.

== Video game ==
A pinball game called Ultra Legend Pinball was released internationally for the iPhone and iPod Touch as an application in the App Store. The download for the application is free, but an in-app purchase of ¥350/US$2.99/£1.79/€2,39 is required to play the full game (the "Free Version" is only a demo version). Also, there's a new Ultra Galaxy Legend Game release for Wii.
