= Ultraman Zero: The Revenge of Belial =

Ultraman Zero THE MOVIE Super Decisive Battle! Belial Galactic Empire
- Promotional poster
- Directed by: Yuichi Abe
- Written by: Yuichi Abe
- Produced by: Tsuburaya Productions
- Starring: Yu Koyanagi; Tatsuomi Hamada; Tao Tsuchiya
- Cinematography: Hiroshi Mikuriya
- Edited by: Shinichi Suzuki
- Music by: Kenji Kawai
- Distributed by: Shochiku
- Release date: December 23, 2010
- Running time: 100 minutes
- Country: Japan
- Language: Japanese
- Box office: $4.2 million

Ultraman Zero THE MOVIE Super Decisive Battle! Belial Galactic Empire (ウルトラマンゼロ THE MOVIE 超決戦！ベリアル銀河帝国, Urutoraman Zero THE MOVIE: Chōkessen! Beriaru Ginga Teikoku; lit. "Ultraman Zero The Movie: Super Deciding Fight! The Belial Galactic Empire") is a 2010 Japanese superhero film in the Ultra Series to celebrate the franchise's 45th anniversary. It serves as a sequel to Mega Monster Battle: Ultra Galaxy Legend The Movie. The catchphrases for the movie are "Kaiser Belial descent. Zero, fight with light!" and "This is our light!".

The film was directed by Yuichi Abe. The lead character Run (who serves as Ultraman Zero's human form) is portrayed by Yu Koyanagi, the son of Bro. Tom of the Bubblegum Brothers. Other characters include Run's brother Nao, portrayed by Tatsuomi Hamada and Princess Emerana of Planet Esmeralda, portrayed by actress Tao Tsuchiya. The film will also feature a new version of Ultraman Belial called "Galactic Emperor Kaiser Belial". It will also feature Ultraman Zero's ultimate form, Ultimate Zero, by using the Shield of Baradhi which becomes the Ultimate Aegis.

== Plot ==
Having survived his battle against Ultraman Zero from the previous film, the evil Ultraman Belial, now known as Galactic Emperor' Kaiser Belial, has taken up a new conquest for universal domination. Having gained two allies in his conquest, as well as creating millions of robot servants known individually as the Legionoids and the Darklops, Belial attacks the planet of Esmeralda. Defeating the Esmeraldan Royal Guard (off-screen) and taking the planet hostage and brainwashing the guardian of the planet, Kaiser Belial is victorious in capturing the planet.

Back in Nebula M78, the Land of Light is attacked by one of Belial's robot carrier, containing 3 Darklopses. Luckily Ultraman Zero shows up along with Ultraseven and destroys the Darklopses before they can get away. Tracing the energy where the Darklops came from, the Ultras come to a conclusion that the Darklops came from an alternate universe and therefore are unable to come together to stop them. Ultraman Zero obligates to go by himself to stop Belial, and so the Ultra Brothers and all of the citizens create a travel sphere to send Ultraman Zero to the universe that Belial is terrorizing. Before departing however, Ultraseven gives Zero a newly crafted item known as the Ultra Zero Bracelet, an item that acts as a backup power source should Zero run out of energy when things are in a dire state. It can be used for only 3 times.

On Planet Annu, Belial's Legionoid army is causing destruction and attacking a group of rebels who are trying to attack. Battling against the Legionoids are Run and Nao, two brothers who pilot a vehicle to do battle against the army. When Run tries to save Nao from falling into a volcanic pit, Ultraman Zero arrives and notices the situation the two are in. The bracelet proved to be useful as the suns in that universe are incapable of recharging Ultra beings. As a result, Ultraman Zero uses Run's body as his host and shortly after joining, Zero easily takes out the Legionoids. However, in doing so Ultraman Zero is forced to assume the identity of Nao's brother, Run to both keep the heavily wounded Run alive as well as to conserve energy.

After greeting Nao and telling him of the situation, Zero (as Run) learns that Belial is harvesting the universe for Emeralds, which can be converted into raw energy. Belial is planning on using mass quantities of the emeralds' power in his conquest of the universe. Nao believes that an artifact known as the Shield of Baradhi is the only thing that can stop Kaiser Belial. Shortly after the truth is realized, the Legionoids attack Run and Nao again but are stopped after the two brothers stow away on an unknown vessel that blasts off into space.

Upon investigating, Run and Nao meet the Princess of Esmeralda, Emerana. They also learn that the ship they are flying on is sentient and is called the Star Corvette Jean-Bird, a spaceship with artificial intelligence that is passed down through the planet's royal family. After being spared from Jean-Bird's memory wiping process. Run and Nao make quick friends with Princess Emerana and after Run reveals his identity as Ultraman Zero, the trio and Jean-Bird agree to stop Kaiser Belial's conquest by searching for the mythical Shield of Baradhi.

Along their way, the heroes meet the Pirates of Flames. A wily crew of hostile pirates that sail on board their ship the Avant-Garde throughout the universe and are based in an astronomical object with mass quantities of Space Nitromethane. With them is their more hot-tempered and feisty bodyguard, Glenfire. At first identifying the Jean-Bird with hostility, Run becomes Ultraman Zero for the first time to try and reason with the crew of pirates. Shortly after, Glenfire and Ultraman Zero battle to prove Zero's innocence, with the fight ending in a standstill and Zero gaining the pirates' and Glenfire's trust. Suddenly the crew are attacked by Kaiser Belial's squadron of Legionoids, lead of one of Kaiser Belial's generals, Darkgone. The Avant-Garde fights back alongside Glenfire and Zero but are ultimately outnumbered and overpowered by Darkgone's squadron of Legionoids, Glenfire provides information about the whereabouts of the Shield of Baradhi to Zero and proceeds to agitates the mass quantities of Space Nitromethane with his fire abilities and causes a massive explosion, destroying all the Legionoids, scares away Darkgone, and seemingly killing Glenfire in the process.

Now with the location of the Shield of Baradhi revealed, The heroes head off to the 2-D Planet of Mirrors. There they meet another bodyguard to the planet and the shield known as Mirror Knight (who was corrupted and brainwashed by Kaiser Belial, as seen at the start of the film.), Run transforms into Ultraman Zero a second time and proceeds to battle with the corrupted Mirror Knight and in the process, expels the evil energy from within Mirror Knight, restoring him back to his senses. Redeemed and grateful, Mirror Knight joins the heroes in their journey and informs them of the Shield of Baradhi's location below the planet's surface.

Upon reaching its location, the Shield of Baradhi is revealed to be a statue known as Noa and a trinket around Nao's neck is all that is left to complete the shield. However, in placing the final piece to the shield, the shield to disintegrate into sand as a result of time passes for centuries, shocking and saddening the heroes for their journey being wasted. Suddenly, the Planet of Mirrors is attacked by another one of Kaiser Belial's generals, Iaron, who proceeds to destroy the Planet of Mirrors with the help of several of Belial's ships. In the ensuring chaos, Mirror Knight is defeated and Run is separated from Nao and Emerana and falls unconscious just before attempting to transform into Ultraman Zero for the third and final time.

Awakening, Run finds himself inside of Belial's massive vessel that is still attached to the planet of Esmeralda and is confronted by a scarred and vengeful Kaiser Belial. Reveling in his "victory," Kaiser Belial reveals that he will send thousands of Darklopses to attack the Land of Light out of revenge for what happened to him in the past. Run watches in horror as the Ultras are beaten by Belial's forces but is overjoyed when he learns that Nao and Emerana have survived the destruction from previously. Also surviving from the destruction was Mirror Knight, who emerges and frees Run so that he may transform into Ultraman Zero. The final battle between Ultraman Zero and Kaiser Belial then proceeds and the two battle to a standstill. However, Kaiser Belial unleashes a Deathcium Ray and incapacitates Ultraman Zero before fleeing.

Meanwhile, Iaron and Mirror Knight face off in Kaiser Belial's headquarters and Darkgone faces off against Jean-Bird, who is running out of power. With no other option, Emerana sacrifices herself to fuel Jean-Bird with her own Emerald energy by locking herself into his main engine, allowing Jean-Bird to transform into his more humanoid robot form known as Jean-Bot. With Nao's help, Jean-Bot destroys Darkgone and Mirror Knight is victorious in killing Iaron as well.

Suddenly, Ultraman Zero finds Kaiser Belial standing atop a mountain of Emeralds he had harvested from planets and Kaiser Belial proceeds to absorb its massive energy qualities, transforming Belial into a towering monster known as Arch Belial. Now physically towering and unstoppable, Arch Belial overpowered and tortures Zero as Mirror Knight and Jean-Bot are unable to stop him. Miraculously, Glenfire returns and rescues Ultraman Zero, as well as reveals that he and the Pirate of Flames also brought along help in the form of the Planet of Mirrors army and the Esmeraldan royal guard who survived the invasion of the planet (starting scene), whom altogether hold off Belial's Legionoid and ship fortresses. Arch Belial however intends on destroying Zero and Esmeralda with his Arch Deathcium Ray. Ultimately during the battle with Belial and having all energies in his bracelet used up, Zero's strength is spent and finally dies from exhaustion.

Now understanding the purpose of the Shield of Baradhi, Nao informs everyone not to lose hope and eventually, Zero is revived and brought forth by Ultraman Noa, who bestows the Shield of Baradhi onto Zero, transforming the Ultra into Ultimate Zero. With his enhanced powers, Ultimate Zero destroys Arch Belial with the Final Ultimate Zero, saving the universe from his tyranny.

With Belial gone for good, tranquility returns to the universe. Princess Emerana reveals to have survived using her energy to power Jean-Bot, the Ultras back in M78 are revealed to have not only survived but has also stopped Belial's forces as well, and Ultraman Zero separates from Run's body, allowing him to live a normal life with Nao again. Ultraman Zero proceeds to head back to his home universe, but has a change of heart when Glenfire, Mirror Knight, and Jean-Bot urge him to stay. Thus, Zero forms the Ultimate Force Zero out of the allies and friends he had made along his journey and Zero decides to stay with the group after all.

== Ultra Galaxy Legend Side Story ==
To promote the movie, two special DVDs were released to lead up to the storyline of the movie titled Ultra Galaxy Legend Side Story: Ultraman Zero vs. Darklops Zero (ウルトラ銀河伝説外伝 ウルトラマンゼロVSダークロプスゼロ, Urutora Ginga Densetsu Gaiden Urutoraman Zero Bui Esu Dākuropusu Zero). Shota Minami, Hiroyuki Konishi, Ryu Manatsu, and Mamoru Miyano reprise their roles from Ultra Galaxy Mega Monster Battle, Never Ending Odyssey, and Mega Monster Battle: Ultra Galaxy in these DVDs.

== Cast ==
- Run (ラン, Ran): Yu Koyanagi (小柳 友, Koyanagi Yū)
- Nao (ナオ): Tatsuomi Hamada (濱田 龍臣, Hamada Tatsuomi)
- Princess Emerana Luludo Esmeralda (エメラナ・ルルド・エスメラルダ姫, Emerana Rurudo Esumeraruda-hime): Tao Tsuchiya (土屋 太鳳, Tsuchiya Tao)
- Hiro (ヒロ): Tamotsu Ishibashi (石橋 保, Ishibashi Tamotsu)
- Mina (ミナ): Yasue Sato (さとう やすえ, Satō Yasue)
- Young Run: Kaito Nitta (新田 海統, Nitta Kaito)
- Young Nao: Kaito Kobayashi (小林 櫂人, Kobayashi Kaito)
- Grandma: Minako Ide (井出 みな子, Ide Minako)
- King Emerado (エメラド王, Emerado-ō):: Kenro Nanbara (南原 健朗, Nanbara Kenrō)
- Queen Emelulu (エメルル王妃, Emeruru-ōhi): Yuka Hanabusa (英 由佳, Hanabusa Yuka)
- Princess Emeral (エメラル王女, Emeraru-ōjo): Maaya Takada (高田 真綾, Takada Maaya)
- Garu (ガル): Sei Hiraizumi (平泉 成, Hiraizumi Sei)
- Giru (ギル): Kitaro (きたろう, Kitarō)
- Guru (グル): Bengaru (ベンガル)
- Ultraman Zero (ウルトラマンゼロ, Urutoraman Zero; Voice), Darklops (ダークロプス, Dākuropusu; Voice): Mamoru Miyano (宮野 真守, Miyano Mamoru)
- Glenfire (グレンファイヤー, Gurenfaiyā): Tomokazu Seki (関 智一, Seki Tomokazu)
- Mirror Knight (ミラーナイト, Mirā Naito; Voice): Hikaru Midorikawa (緑川 光, Midorikawa Hikaru)
- Jean-Bot (ジャンボット, Jan Botto; Voice): Hiroshi Kamiya (神谷 浩史, Kamiya Hiroshi)
- Father of Ultra (ウルトラの父, Urutora no Chichi; Voice): Tokuma Nishioka (西岡 徳馬, Nishioka Tokuma)
- Ultraman (ウルトラマン, Urutoraman; Voice): Susumu Kurobe (黒部 進, Kurobe Susumu)
- Zoffy (ゾフィー, Zofī; Voice): Hideyuki Tanaka (田中 秀幸, Tanaka Hideyuki)
- Ultraseven (ウルトラセブン, Urutorasebun; Voice): Kohji Moritsugu (森次 晃嗣, Moritsugu Kōji)
- Ultraman Jack (ウルトラマンジャック, Urutoraman Jakku; Voice): Jiro Dan (団 時郎, Dan Jirō)
- Ultraman Ace (ウルトラマンエース, Urutoraman Ēsu; Voice): Keiji Takamine (高峰 圭二, Takamine Keiji)
- Ultraman Taro (ウルトラマンタロウ, Urutoraman Tarō; Voice): Hiroya Ishimaru (石丸 博也, Ishimaru Hiroya)
- Ultraman 80 (ウルトラマン80, Urutoraman Eiti; Voice): Hatsunori Hasegawa (長谷川 初範, Hasegawa Hatsunori)
- Yullian (ユリアン, Yurian; Voice): Sayoko Hagiwara (萩原 佐代子, Hagiwara Sayoko)
- Kaiser Belial (カイザーベリアル, Kaizā Beriaru; Voice): Hiroyuki Miyasako (宮迫 博之, Miyasako Hiroyuki) of Ameagari Kesshitai
- Iaron (アイアロン, Aiaron; Voice): Norio Wakamoto (若本 規夫, Wakamoto Norio)
- Darkgone (ダークゴーネ, Dākugōne; Voice): Taiyo Kawashita (川下 大洋, Kawashita Taiyō)
- Two-Dimensional Person (二次元の民, Nijigen no Tami; Voice): Nobuyuki Ishida (石田 信之, Ishida Nobuyuki)
- Narration: Koji Ishizaka (石坂 浩二, Ishizaka Kōji)

=== English dub actors ===
- Robbie Stubbs as Run
- Anisa Vong as Nao
- Beth Ann Sweezer as Princess Emerana
- Daniel Van Thomas as Ultraman Zero
- David Foy Bauer as Mirror Knight
- Paul Stanko as Glenfire
- William Winckler as Jean-Bot
- Kyle Rea as Kaiser Belial
- Adam Sartain as Darkgone
- William Knight as Ultraman
- G. Larry Butler as Ultraseven
- Phil Miler as Zoffy
- Brad Potts as Ultraman Jack
- Frank Gerrish as Ultraman Ace
- Lisle Wilkerson as Mother of Ultra
- Linda Weinrib as Godmother
- Marty Hrejsa as Space Pirate Garu
- Jay Dee Witney as Space Pirate

== Theme songs ==
Opening theme

- "Susume! Ultraman Zero" (すすめ!ウルトラマンゼロ, Susume! Urutoraman Zero; lit. "Let's Go! Ultraman Zero")
  - Lyrics: Tomohiro Yamaguchi (山口 智大, Yamaguchi Tomohiro)
  - Composition & Arrangement: Takao Konishi (小西 貴雄, Konishi Takao)
  - Artist: voyager

Ending theme

- "Unmei no Shizuku ~Destiny's star~" (運命のしずく ～Destiny's star～; lit. "Drop of Fate ~Destiny's star~")
  - Lyrics: Chisa (千紗), Kenn Kato
  - Composition: Daisuke Suzuki (鈴木 大輔, Suzuki Daisuke)
  - Arrangement: GIRL NEXT DOOR, Hiroki Mizukami (水上 裕規, Mizukami Hiroki)
  - Artist: GIRL NEXT DOOR

== Reception ==
The film earned $4,295,855 at the Japanese box office.
