= Susumu Kurobe =

Japanese actor

- 黒部 進
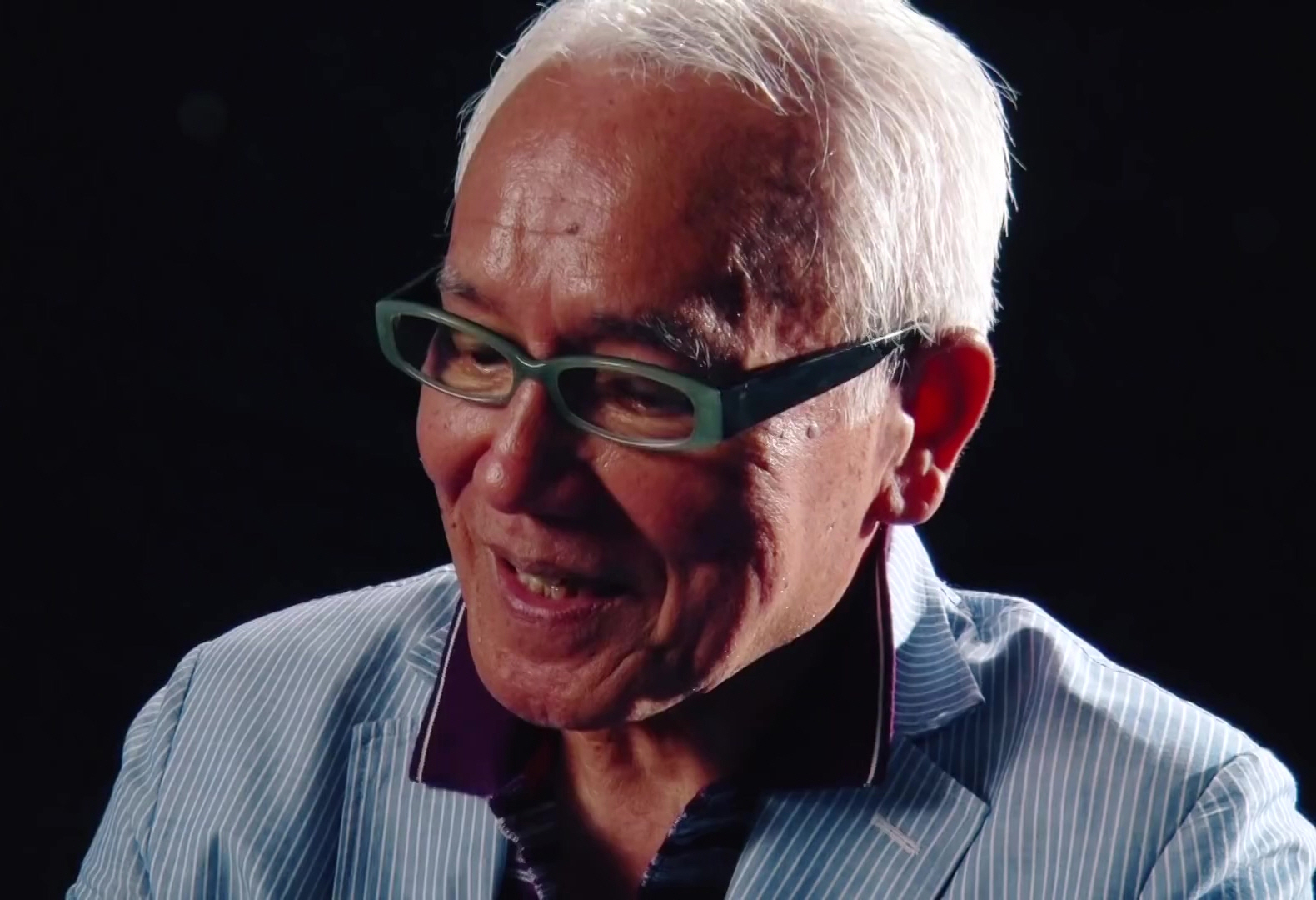
- Kurobe in 2016
- Born: 吉本 隆志 (Takashi Yoshimoto); 22 October 1939 (age 86); Kurobe, Toyama, Japan
- Status: Married
- Occupation: Actor
- Years active: 1963–present
- Notable credit: Ultraman/Shin Hayata in the Ultraman series
- Relatives: Takami Yoshimoto (daughter)
- Website: http://www.art-promotion.jp/prof_male02_kurobe.html

Susumu Kurobe (黒部 進, Kurobe Susumu) (born Takashi Yoshimoto (吉本 隆志, Yoshimoto Takashi); 22 October 1939) is a television, film and stage actor from Kurobe, Toyama, Japan, widely known for his portrayal of Shin Hayata, the first Ultraman in the titular television series, a role he has played since 1966 and many other times during the franchise. In 2005, he played chief Kenzo Tomioka in Ultraman Max.

He made his film debut with Akatsukino Gasho in 1963. After appearing in Ultraman, he turned into a villain actor and appeared in many jidaigeki dramas.

His daughter, Takami Yoshimoto, is also an actress, who portrayed Rena Yanase in Ultraman Tiga (1996).

== Filmography ==
=== Films ===
- 1963: Akatsuki no gasshô
- 1964: Kokusai himitsu keisatsu: Tora no kiba as Sabato
- 1964: Hadaka no jûyaku as Kajimoto
- 1964: Ghidorah, the Three-Headed Monster as Moustachoied Assassin
- 1965: None but the Brave as Private Goro
- 1965: Taiheiyô kiseki no sakusen: Kisuka as Kato
- 1965: Kemonomichi
- 1965: Kokusai himitsu keisatsu: Kagi no kagi (Used to make What's Up, Tiger Lily?) as He-Qing Cai
- 1965: Hyappatsu hyakuchu as Man of sunglasses
- 1966: Abare Gôemon as Jyuro Kamiho
- 1966: Kiganjô no bôken as Military Leader
- 1966: What's Up, Tiger Lily? as He-Qing Cai (archive footage)
- 1967: King Kong Escapes as Henchman #3
- 1967: Son of Godzilla as Navigator
- 1967: Ultraman as Shin Hayata / Ultraman
- 1968: Kill! as Kinsaburo Ayuzawa
- 1968: Destroy All Monsters as Kilaak Controlled Staffer #3
- 1968: Isoroku as Army staff officer #2
- 1969: Goyôkin as Omura Sobee
- 1969: Latitude Zero as Chen
- 1975: The Bullet Train as Goto
- 1976: Zoku ningen kakumei
- 1979: Ultraman: Great Monster Decisive Battle as Shin Hayata / Ultraman
- 1979: Ultraman Kaijuu Daikessen as Shin Hayata / Ultraman
- 1990: Ultra Q the Movie: Hoshi no densetsu as Shin Hayata / Ultraman
- 1991: Godzilla vs. King Ghidorah as Fuyuki Takaoka
- 1992: Godzilla vs. Mothra as Fuyuki Takaoka
- 1993: Godzilla vs. Mechagodzilla II as Fuyuki Takaoka
- 1996: Revive! Ultraman as Shin Hayata / Ultraman (archive footage)
- 1997: Ultraman Zearth 2: Choujin Taisen Hikari to Yami as Night Watchman (Cameo)
- 1997: Ultraman Zearth 2 as Shin Hayata / Ultraman
- 2000: Godzilla vs. Megaguirus as Fuyuki Takaoka
- 2001: Ultraman Cosmos: The First Contact as Police Officer (cameo)
- 2003: Round 1
- 2005: Deep Sea Beast Reigo as Captain Yamagami
- 2006: Ultraman Mebius & Ultraman Brothers as Shin Hayata / Ultraman
- 2008: The Monster X Strikes Back/Attack the G8 Summit
- 2008: Superior Ultraman 8 Brothers as Shin Hayata / Ultraman
- 2009: Mega Monster Battle: Ultra Galaxy as Shin Hayata / Ultraman
- 2010: Ultraman Zero: The Revenge of Belial as Shin Hayata / Ultraman (voice)
- 2011: Hômukamingu as Tsutomu Ishida
- 2012: Ultraman Saga as Shin Hayata / Ultraman
- 2013: Zeusu no houtei
- 2014: Genge

=== Television ===
- 1966: Ultra Q (Episode 8) as Shigeo Kimura
- 1966–1967: Ultraman as Shin Hayata / Ultraman
- 1970: Moeyo Ken as Nagakura Shinpachi
- 1971-1984: Ōedo Sōsamō (episodes 6, 74, 184, 210, 309, 396, 418, 452, 533, 572, 586, 616, and 631)
- 1971: The Return of Ultraman (Episode 38) as Shin Hayata / Ultraman
- 1972: Ronin of the Wilderness (episodes 27, 61)
- 1973: Robotto Keiji (Episode 23) as X-3
- 1973-79: Taiyō ni Hoero! (episodes 61, 123, 167, and 347)
- The Water Margin (1973)
- 1973: Ultraman Taro (Episodes 33 & 34) as Shin Hayata / Ultraman
- 1974: Ultraman Leo (Episode 30) as Shinji Ookuma
- 1976-2007: Mito Kōmon
- 1976: Space Ironman Kyodain (Episode 27) as Doctor
- 1977: Shin Hissatsu Shiokinin (Episode 40) as Sanji
- 1977: J.A.K.Q. Dengekitai (Episode 12) as Crime Boss
- 1978: Hissatsu Karakurinin Fugakuhyakkei Koroshitabi (Episode 4)
- 1979: Megaloman as Berlock
- 1981-82: Seibu Keisatsu (Episodes 102 & 125)
- 1982: Uchuu Keiji Gavan (Episode 7) as Satohara / Doubleman
- 1985: Sukeban Deka (Episode 4)
- 1987–1988: Kamen Rider Black (Episodes 2–4, 10, 14 and 19) as Dr. Hidetomi Kuromatsu
- 1990–1991: Tokkei Winspector (Episodes 1, 48 & 49) as Dr. Onikichi Kuroda
- 1992: Tokusou Exceedraft (Episodes 45) as Harada
- 1993: Yugen Jikkou Sisters Chouchoutrian (Episode 40) as Shin Hayata
- 1993: Gridman the Hyper Agent (Episode 4) as Hosono
- 2003: Kokoro as Tatsuzo Murakami
- 2005–2006: Ultraman Max as Kenzou Tomioka
- 2007: Ultraman Mebius (Episodes 47 & 50) as Shin Hayata / Ultraman
- 2007: Mito Kōmon
- 2017: Samurai Gourmet (Episode 10) as Refined Gentleman / White Knight
