= Ultraman Leo =

Japanese television series

- Genre: Tokusatsu; Kaiju; Dark Fantasy; Superhero; Science fiction; Action/Adventure; Kyodai Hero
- Created by: Tsuburaya Productions
- Developed by: Shigemitsu Taguchi
- Directed by: Tadashi Mafune
- Starring: Ryu Manatsu; Yū Fujiki; Kaori Okano; Tsunehiro Arai; Yoshiko Tominaga; Yukio Itō; Masumi Harukawa; Fujiko Nara; Kaoru Sugita; Takashi Kanda; Takeshi Ōbayashi; Kōji Moritsugu; Mieko Mita; Shigeo Tezuka; Masaharu Matsusaka; Takashi Asakura
- Composer: Tōru Fuyuki
- Country of origin: Japan
- No. of episodes: 51

Production
- Running time: 24 minutes (per episode)
- Production companies: Tsuburaya Productions; TBS

Original release
- Network: JNN (TBS)
- Release: April 12, 1974 – March 28, 1975

Related
- Ultraman Taro; The Ultraman

Ultraman Leo (ウルトラマンレオ, Urutoraman Reo) is a Japanese tokusatsu television show and the sixth Ultraman show (or the seventh if Ultra Q is included) in the Ultra Series. Produced by Tsuburaya Productions, Ultraman Leo was aired between April 12, 1974, and March 28, 1975, with a total of 51 episodes. Tatsumi Nikamoto was the in-suit actor of the main character, Ultraman Leo.

== Plot ==
Ultraman Leo comes from Nebula L77 (Leo constellation), and takes the human form of Gen Ootori. Ultraseven appears to fight a new foe, Alien Magma and his two "pets", the Red and Black Giras. Ultimately, Ultraseven is greatly overpowered and his leg is graphically broken by Black Giras. Ultraman Leo drives off the foes, but Ultraseven is confined to his human form because of his injuries and due to the Ultra Eye being damaged when he attempted to transform. Dan then maintains his role as Captain of MAC (Monster Attack Crew). Gen is a gymnastics teacher on the side and joins MAC to defend the Earth. Gen and Dan regularly train together, allowing Ultraman Leo to learn many moves in human form. In episode 34, Dan asks Ultraman Jack to take the Ultra Eye back to M78 to be restored while he heals on Earth. However, in episode 40 MAC is destroyed by Silver Bloome, a saucer monster that belongs to Commander Black. During the attack Dan asks Leo to keep defending the Earth and disappears in the conflagration. It is later shown that he was taken back to M78 to be fully healed and restored as Ultraseven. Gen is now unemployed and spends most of his time training the kids to defend themselves as well as defending the Earth as Ultraman Leo. Commander Black and Alien Bunyo capture Gen when he cannot transform completely. Gen as Leo is then dismembered, only to be brought back to life by Ultraman King. Leo would then face Commander Black's final monster, Black End, with the kids he trained, the latter of whom kill Black, and hand the sphere used to control Black End to Leo. Finishing his mission, Gen removes his Leo Ring and sets off to tour Earth, his "second home".

== Episodes ==
No.	Title	Directed by	Written by	Original release date
1	"The Day When Ultraseven Dies, Is the Day When Tokyo Sinks!"; Transliteration: "Sebun ga Shinu Toki! Tōkyō wa Chinbotsu Suru!" (Japanese: セブンが死ぬ時！東京は沈没する！)	Tadashi Mafune	Shigemitsu Taguchi	April 12, 1974
2	"The Great Sinking! Twilight of the Japanese Archipelago"; Transliteration: "Dai Chinbotsu! Nihon Rettō Saigo no Hi" (Japanese: 大沈没！日本列島最後の日)	Tadashi Mafune	Shigemitsu Taguchi	April 19, 1974
3	"Farewell, Tears..."; Transliteration: "Namida yo Sayonara..." (Japanese: 涙よさよなら…)	Kiyozumi Fukazawa	Shigemitsu Taguchi	April 26, 1974
4	"An Oath Between Men"; Transliteration: "Otoko to Otoko no Chikai" (Japanese: 男と男の誓い)	Kiyozumi Fukazawa	Shigemitsu Taguchi	May 3, 1974
5	"Don't Cry! You're a Man"; Transliteration: "Naku na! Omae wa Otoko no Ko" (Japanese: 泣くな！おまえは男の子)	Shōhei Tōjō	Bunpei Ai	May 10, 1974
6	"You're a Man! Get Fired Up!"; Transliteration: "Otoko da! Moero!" (Japanese: 男だ！燃えろ！)	Shōhei Tōjō	Shigemitsu Taguchi	May 17, 1974
7	"A Beautiful Man's Will"; Transliteration: "Utsukushii Otoko no Iji" (Japanese: 美しい男の意地)	Tōru Toyama	Bunpei Ai	May 24, 1974
8	"Deadly! The Monster Mastermind!"; Transliteration: "Hissatsu! Kaijū Shikakenin" (Japanese: 必殺！怪獣仕掛人)	Tōru Toyama	Bunpei Ai	May 31, 1974
9	"The Bridge of Friendship Across Space"; Transliteration: "Uchū ni Kakeru Yūjō no Hashi" (Japanese: 宇宙にかける友情の橋)	Kiyozumi Fukazawa	Tetsurō Domon	June 7, 1974
10	"The Monster That Wanders in Sorrow"; Transliteration: "Kanashimi no Sasurai Kaijū" (Japanese: かなしみのさすらい怪獣)	Kiyozumi Fukazawa	Bunpei Ai	June 14, 1974
11	"A Man Covered in Mud"; Transliteration: "Doro Mamire Otoko Hitori" (Japanese: 泥まみれ男ひとり)	Masanori Kakehi	Shigemitsu Taguchi	June 21, 1974
12	"The Adventure Boy Arrives!"; Transliteration: "Bōken Yarō ga Kita!" (Japanese: 冒険野郎が来た！)	Masanori Kakehi	Bunpei Ai	June 28, 1974
13	"Explosion! Two Desperate Aliens"; Transliteration: "Dai Bakuhatsu! Sutemi no Uchūjin Futari" (Japanese: 大爆発！捨身の宇宙人ふたり)	Isao Maeda	Shigemitsu Taguchi	July 5, 1974
14	"Deadly Fists! The Boy Who Calls Forth a Storm"; Transliteration: "Hissatsuken! Arashi o Yobu Shōnen" (Japanese: 必殺拳！嵐を呼ぶ少年)	Isao Maeda	Bunpei Ai	July 12, 1974
15	"Blind Attack! The Blow With Fighting Spirit"; Transliteration: "Kurayami Sappō! Tōkon no Ichigeki" (Japanese: くらやみ殺法！闘魂の一撃)	Tōru Toyama	Shigemitsu Taguchi	July 19, 1974
16	"The Woman Who Faded into the Night"; Transliteration: "Mayonaka ni Kieta Onna" (Japanese: 真夜中に消えた女)	Tōru Toyama	Bunzō Wakatsuki	July 26, 1974
17	"Behold! Ultra Horror Series: The Werewolf's Bride"; Transliteration: "Miyo! Urutora Kaiki Shirīzu Ōkami Otoko no Hanayome" (Japanese: 見よ！ウルトラ怪奇シリーズ 狼男の花嫁)	Masataka Yamamoto	Shigemitsu Taguchi	August 2, 1974
18	"Behold! Ultra Horror Series: Vampire! Bat Girl"; Transliteration: "Miyo! Urutora Kaiki Shirīzu Kyūketsuki! Kōmori Shōjo" (Japanese: 見よ！ウルトラ怪奇シリーズ 吸血鬼！こうもり少女)	Masataka Yamamoto	Bunpei Ai	August 9, 1974
19	"Behold! Ultra Horror Series: The Revived Merman"; Transliteration: "Miyo! Urutora Kaiki Shirīzu Yomigaeru Hangyojin" (Japanese: 見よ！ウルトラ怪奇シリーズ よみがえる半魚人)	Tōru Toyama	Shigemitsu Taguchi	August 16, 1974
20	"Behold! Ultra Horror Series: The Mysterious Boy from Ursa Minor"; Transliteration: "Miyo! Urutora Kaiki Shirīzu Fushigi na Koguma-za no Shōnen" (Japanese: 見よ！ウルトラ怪奇シリーズ ふしぎな子熊座の少年)	Tōru Toyama	Bunpei Ai	August 23, 1974
21	"Behold! Ultra Horror Series: I Saw a Goddess in the Far North!"; Transliteration: "Miyo! Urutora Kaiki Shirīzu Kita no Hate ni Megami o Mita!" (Japanese: 見よ！ウルトラ怪奇シリーズ 北の果てに女神を見た！)	Tōru Toyama	Shigemitsu Taguchi	August 30, 1974
22	"The Leo Brothers vs. the Monster Brothers"; Transliteration: "Reo Kyōdai Tai Kaijū Kyōdai" (Japanese: レオ兄弟対怪獣兄弟)	Kiyozumi Fukazawa	Shigemitsu Taguchi	September 6, 1974
23	"The Mischievous Alien Who Fell Out of His Bed"; Transliteration: "Beddo kara Ochita Itazura Seijin" (Japanese: ベッドから落ちたいたずら星人)	Kiyozumi Fukazawa	Bunzō Wakatsuki	September 13, 1974
24	"The Beautiful Virgo Maiden"; Transliteration: "Utsukushii Otome-za no Shōjo" (Japanese: 美しいおとめ座の少女)	Isao Maeda	Keijirō Okutsu	September 20, 1974
25	"The Rhinoceros Beetle Is an Alien Invader!"; Transliteration: "Kabutomushi wa Uchū no Shinryakusha!" (Japanese: かぶと虫は宇宙の侵略者！)	Isao Maeda	Bunzō Wakatsuki	September 27, 1974
26	"Japanese Folklore Series! Ultraman King vs. the Wizard (From Little One-Inch)"; Transliteration: "Nihon Meisaku Minwa Shirīzu! Urutoraman Kingu Tai Mahōtsukai Issun-bōshi yori" (Japanese: 日本名作民話シリーズ！ウルトラマンキング対魔法使い 一寸法師より)	Jun Ōki	Shigemitsu Taguchi	October 4, 1974
27	"Japanese Folklore Series! Mighty! Momotaro! (From Momotaro)"; Transliteration: "Nihon Meisaku Minwa Shirīzu! Tsuyoi zo! Momotarō! Momotarō yori" (Japanese: 日本名作民話シリーズ！強いぞ！桃太郎！桃太郎より)	Jun Ōki	Bunpei Ai	October 11, 1974
28	"Japanese Folklore Series! Return of the Captain Mustache! (From Urashima Taro)"; Transliteration: "Nihon Meisaku Minwa Shirīzu! Kaettekita Hige Senchō! Urashima Tarō yori" (Japanese: 日本名作民話シリーズ！帰ってきたひげ船長！浦島太郎より)	Masataka Yamamoto	Bunzō Wakatsuki	October 18, 1974
29	"Japanese Folklore Series! Fated Reunion! Dan and Anne (From The Fox Kid)"; Transliteration: "Nihon Meisaku Minwa Shirīzu! Unmei no Saikai! Dan to Annu Kitsune ga Kureta Ko yori" (Japanese: 日本名作民話シリーズ！運命の再会！ダンとアンヌ 狐がくれた子より)	Masataka Yamamoto	Bunpei Ai	October 25, 1974
30	"Japanese Folklore Series! Monster's Return of a Favor (From Crane's Return of a Favor)"; Transliteration: "Nihon Meisaku Minwa Shirīzu! Kaijū no Ongaeshi Tsuru no Ongaeshi yori" (Japanese: 日本名作民話シリーズ！怪獣の恩返し 鶴の恩返しより)	Masanori Kakehi	Shigemitsu Taguchi	November 1, 1974
31	"Japanese Folklore Series! The White Flower That Protects the Earth (From Hanasaka Jiisan)"; Transliteration: "Nihon Meisaku Minwa Shirīzu! Chikyū o Mamoru Shiroi Hana Hanasaka Jiisan yori" (Japanese: 日本名作民話シリーズ！地球を守る白い花 花咲か爺さんより)	Masanori Kakehi	Keijirō Okutsu	November 8, 1974
32	"Japanese Folklore Series! Farewell, Princess Kaguya (From The Tale of the Bamboo Cutter)"; Transliteration: "Nihon Meisaku Minwa Shirīzu! Sayōnara Kaguya-hime Taketori Monogatari yori" (Japanese: 日本名作民話シリーズ！さようならかぐや姫 竹取り物語より)	Nobuo Nakagawa	Toshirō Ishidō	November 15, 1974
33	"The Leo Brothers vs. the Space Demon Alien"; Transliteration: "Reo Kōdai Tai Uchū Akuryō Seijin" (Japanese: レオ兄弟対宇宙悪霊星人)	Nobuo Nakagawa	Bunzō Wakatsuki	November 22, 1974
34	"The Ultra Brothers' Eternal Vow"; Transliteration: "Urutora Kyōdai Eien no Chikai" (Japanese: ウルトラ兄弟永遠の誓い)	Isao Maeda	Bunpei Ai	November 29, 1974
35	"I'm the Monster Boss!"; Transliteration: "Oira wa Kaijū Taishō da!" (Japanese: おいらは怪獣大将だ！)	Isao Maeda	Shigemitsu Taguchi	December 6, 1974
36	"Fly! The Leo Brothers, Save the Space Base!"; Transliteration: "Tobe! Reo Kyōdai Uchū Kichi o Sukue!" (Japanese: 飛べ！レオ兄弟 宇宙基地を救え！)	Makoto Okamura	Shigemitsu Taguchi	December 13, 1974
37	"Haunted! Devil in the Mirror"; Transliteration: "Kaiki! Akuma no Sumu Kagami" (Japanese: 怪奇！悪魔のすむ鏡)	Makoto Okamura	Shigemitsu Taguchi	December 20, 1974
38	"Showdown! The Leo Brothers vs. the Ultra Brothers"; Transliteration: "Kettō! Reo Kyōdai Tai Urutora Kyōdai" (Japanese: 決闘！レオ兄弟対ウルトラ兄弟)	Shōhei Tōjō	Bunzō Wakatsuki	December 27, 1974
39	"The Leo Brothers, the Ultra Brothers, the Moment of Victory"; Transliteration: "Reo Kyōdai Urutora Kyōdai Shōri no Toki" (Japanese: レオ兄弟 ウルトラ兄弟 勝利の時)	Shōhei Tōjō	Shigemitsu Taguchi	January 3, 1975
40	"The Terrifying Saucer Creature Series! MAC Annihilated! The Flying Saucer Is Alive!"; Transliteration: "Kyōfu no Enban Seibutsu Shirīzu! Makku Zenmetsu! Enban wa Seibutsu datta!" (Japanese: 恐怖の円盤生物シリーズ！MAC全滅！円盤は生物だった！)	Kiyozumi Fukazawa	Shigemitsu Taguchi	January 10, 1975
41	"The Terrifying Saucer Creature Series! The Saucer Creature from the Demon Planet Has Come!"; Transliteration: "Kyōfu no Enban Seibutsu Shirīzu! Akuma no Wakusei kara Enban Seibutsu ga Kita!" (Japanese: 恐怖の円盤生物シリーズ！悪魔の惑星から円盤生物が来た！)	Kiyozumi Fukazawa	Shigemitsu Taguchi	January 17, 1975
42	"The Terrifying Saucer Creature Series! Leo's in Danger! The Assassin Is a Saucer Creature"; Transliteration: "Kyōfu no Enban Seibutsu Shirīzu! Reo ga Abunai! Ansatsusha wa Enban Seibutsu" (Japanese: 恐怖の円盤生物シリーズ！レオが危い！暗殺者は円盤生物)	Isao Maeda	Bunpei Ai	January 24, 1975
43	"The Terrifying Saucer Creature Series! Challenge! Terror of the Blood Sucking Saucer"; Transliteration: "Kyōfu no Enban Seibutsu Shirīzu! Chōsen! Kyūketsu Enban no Kyōfu" (Japanese: 恐怖の円盤生物シリーズ！挑戦！吸血円盤の恐怖)	Isao Maeda	Bunzō Wakatsuki	January 31, 1975
44	"The Terrifying Saucer Creature Series! The Shooting Star from Hell!"; Transliteration: "Kyōfu no Enban Seibutsu Shirīzu! Jigoku kara Kita Nagareboshi!" (Japanese: 恐怖の円盤生物シリーズ！地獄から来た流れ星！)	Tōru Toyama	Shigemitsu Taguchi	February 7, 1975
45	"The Terrifying Saucer Creature Series! The Ghost Girl"; Transliteration: "Kyōfu no Enban Seibutsu Shirīzu! Maboroshi no Shōjo" (Japanese: 恐怖の円盤生物シリーズ！まぼろしの少女)	Tōru Toyama	Bunpei Ai	February 14, 1975
46	"The Terrifying Saucer Creature Series! The Leo Brothers Fight! The End of the Saucer Creature!"; Transliteration: "Kyōfu no Enban Seibutsu Shirīzu! Tatakau Reo Kyōdai! Enban Seibutsu no Saigo!" (Japanese: 恐怖の円盤生物シリーズ！戦うレオ兄弟！円盤生物の最後！)	Shōhei Tōjō	Shigemitsu Taguchi	February 21, 1975
47	"The Terrifying Saucer Creature Series! The Girl Who Collects the Stardust of Demons"; Transliteration: "Kyōfu no Enban Seibutsu Shirīzu! Akuma no Hoshikuzu o Atsumeru Shōjo" (Japanese: 恐怖の円盤生物シリーズ！悪魔の星くずを集める少女)	Shōhei Tōjō	Bunzō Wakatsuki	February 28, 1975
48	"The Terrifying Saucer Creature Series! The Monstrous Bird Saucer Attacks the Japanese Archipelago!"; Transliteration: "Kyōfu no Enban Seibutsu Shirīzu! Dai Kaichō Enban Nihon Rettō o Osou!" (Japanese: 恐怖の円盤生物シリーズ！大怪鳥円盤 日本列島を襲う！)	Masataka Yamamoto	Bunzō Wakatsuki	March 7, 1975
49	"The Terrifying Saucer Creature Series! The Red Assassin That Brings Death!"; Transliteration: "Kyōfu no Enban Seibutsu Shirīzu! Shi o Yobu Akai Ansatsusha!" (Japanese: 恐怖の円盤生物シリーズ！死を呼ぶ赤い暗殺者！)	Masataka Yamamoto	Bunpei Ai	March 14, 1975
50	"The Terrifying Saucer Creature Series! Leo's Life! The King's Miracle!"; Transliteration: "Kyōfu no Enban Seibutsu Shirīzu! Reo no Inochi yo! Kingu no Kiseki!" (Japanese: 恐怖の円盤生物シリーズ！レオの命よ！キングの奇跡！)	Eizō Yamagiwa	Toshirō Ishidō	March 21, 1975
51	"The Terrifying Saucer Creature Series! Farewell, Leo! Setting Off for the Sun"; Transliteration: "Kyōfu no Enban Seibutsu Shirīzu! Sayōnara Reo! Taiyō e no Tabidachi" (Japanese: 恐怖の円盤生物シリーズ！さようならレオ！太陽への出発(たびだち))	Eizō Yamagiwa	Shigemitsu Taguchi	March 28, 1975

== Cast ==
- Gen Ootori (おゝとり ゲン, Ōtori Gen): Ryu Manatsu (真夏 竜, Manatsu Ryū).
- Shōji Ōmura (大村 正司, Ōmura Shōji; 1-22): Yū Fujiki (藤木 悠, Fujiki Yū)
- Momoko Yamaguchi (山口 百子, Yamaguchi Momoko; 1-40): Kaori Okano (丘野 かおり, Okano Kaori)
- Tooru Umeda (梅田 トオル, Umeda Tōru; 3-51): Tsunehiro Arai (新井 つねひろ, Arai Tsunehiro).
- Kaoru Umeda (梅田 カオル, Umeda Kaoru; 1-40): Yoshiko Tominaga (富永 美子, Tominaga Yoshiko)
- Takeshi Nomura (野村 猛, Nomura Takeshi; 1-40): Yukio Itō (伊藤 幸雄, Itō Yukio)
- Izumi Miyama (美山 いずみ, Miyama Izumi; 40-51): Fujiko Nara (奈良 富士子, Nara Fujiko)
- Ayumi Miyama (美山 あゆみ, Miyama Ayumi; 40-51): Kaoru Sugita (杉田 かおる, Sugita Kaoru)
- Akio Kuroda (黒田 明雄, Kuroda Akio; 1-8): Kenzō Kuroda (黒田 健三, Kuroda Kenzō) (Note: Credited under Sō Kuroda (黒田 宗, Kuroda Sō))
- Ichirō Aoshima (青島 一郎, Aoshima Ichirō; 1-11, 13-16): Yūichi Yanagisawa (柳沢 優一, Yanagisawa Yūichi)
- Kiyohiko Akashi (赤石 清彦, Akashi Kiyohiko; 1-16): Kenji Ōshima (大島 健二, Ōshima Kenji)
- Atsushi Hirayama (平山 あつし, Hirayama Atsushi; 9-18): Nobuo Hirasawa (平沢 信夫, Hirasawa Nobuo)
- Haruko Momoi (桃井 晴子, Momoi Haruko; 1-10, 16): Kyōko Aratama (新玉 恭子, Aratama Kyōko)
- Junko Shirakawa (白川 純子, Shirakawa Junko; 1-40): Mieko Mita (三田 美枝子, Mita Mieko)
- Daisuke Satō (佐藤 大介, Satō Daisuke; 19-40): Shigeo Tezuka (手塚 茂夫, Tezuka Shigeo)
- Jun Shirato (白土 純, Shirato Jun; 6, 17-40): Masaharu Matsusaka (松坂 雅治, Matsusaka Masaharu)
- Ippei Kajita (梶田 一平, Kajita Ippei; 17-19, 22-40): Takashi Asakura (朝倉 隆, Asakura Takashi)
- Haruko Matsuki (松木 晴子, Matsuki Haruko; 26-40): Tomoko Ai (藍 とも子, Ai Tomoko)
- Miyako Ōtsuki (大槻 美也子, Ōtsuki Miyako; 23, 25): Midori Ōhara (大原 みどり, Ōhara Midori)
- Commander Tatakura (高倉長官, Takakura-chōkan; 13, 36, 39): Takashi Kanda (神田 隆, Kanda Takashi)
- Commander Black (ブラック指令, Burakku Shirei; 40-51): Takeshi Ōbayashi (大林 丈史, Ōbayashi Takeshi)
- Sakiko Miyama (美山 咲子, Miyama Sakiko; 40-51): Masumi Harukawa (春川 ますみ, Harukawa Masumi)
- Dan Moroboshi (モロボシ・ダン, Moroboshi Dan; 1-40): Kohji Moritsugu (森次 晃嗣, Moritsugu Kōji)
- Narrator: Tetsurō Sagawa (瑳川 哲朗, Sagawa Tetsurō)

=== Voice actors ===
- Astra (アストラ, Asutora; 39), Imit-Astra (にせアストラ, Nise Asutora; 39): Junji Maruyama (丸山 純二, Maruyama Junji)
- Ultraman King (ウルトラマンキング, Urutoraman Kingu; 39, 50), Alien Babarue (ババルウ星人, Babarū Seijin; 39): Motomu Kiyokawa (清川 元夢, Kiyokawa Motomu; 39), Hiroshi Masuoka (増岡 弘, Masuoka Hiroshi; 50)
- Zoffy (ゾフィ, Zofi; 39): Satohiro Sakai (酒井 郷博, Sakai Satohiro)
- Original Ultraman (初代ウルトラマン, Shodai Urutoraman; 39): Shinya Nazuka (名塚 新也, Nazuka Shinya)
- Returned Ultraman (帰ってきたウルトラマン, Kaettekita Urutoraman; 39): Takashi Takeuchi (竹内 喬, Takeuchi Takashi)
- Ultraman Ace (ウルトラマンA, Urutoraman Ēsu; 39): Shingo Toyokawa (豊川 晋吾, Toyokawa Shingo)
- Ultraseven (ウルトラセブン, Urutorasebun; 51): Kenji Nakagawa (中川 謙二, Nakagawa Kenji)

=== Guest actors ===
- Hideki Go (郷 秀樹, Gō Hideki; 34): Jirō Dan (団 時朗, Dan Jirō)

== Songs ==
Opening themes

- "Ultraman Leo" (ウルトラマンレオ, Urutoraman Reo)
  - Lyrics: Yū Aku (阿久 悠, Aku Yū)
  - Composition & Arrangement: Makoto Kawaguchi (川口 真, Kawaguchi Makoto)
  - Artist: Ryu Manatsu, Mizuumi Boys and Girls Choir (少年少女合唱団みずうみ, Shōnen Shōjo Gasshōdan Mizuumi) (Tokyo Records (東京レコード, Tōkyō Rekōdo))
  - Episodes: 1-13
- "Tatakae! Ultraman Leo" (戦え! ウルトラマンレオ, Tatakae! Urutoraman Reo; "Fight! Ultraman Leo")
  - Lyrics: Yu Aku
  - Composition & Arrangement: Makoto Kawaguchi
  - Artist: Yuki Hide (ヒデ 夕樹, Hide Yūki), (Note: Credited as Hideyuki Hirano (平野 英之, Hirano Hideyuki)) Mizuumi Boys and Girls Choir (Tokyo Records)
  - Episodes: 14-51

Insert themes

- "MAC no March" (MACのマーチ, Makku no Māchi; "The March of MAC")
  - Lyrics: Yū Aku
  - Composition & Arrangement: Makoto Kawaguchi
  - Artist: Ryu Manatsu, Mizuumi Boys and Girl Choir (Tokyo Records)
  - Episodes: 4
- "Hoshizora no Ballad" (星空のバラード, Hoshizora no Barādo; "The Ballad of the Starry Sky")
  - Lyrics: Yū Aku
  - Composition & Arrangement: Makoto Kawaguchi
  - Artist: Ryu Manatsu (Tokyo Records)
  - Episodes: 1, 10, 51

== Other appearances ==
Besides the Shōwa period, Ultraman Leo's popularity and fighting ability enabled him to make guest appearances in the following Ultra Series after the end of the original TV series.

- Princess Comet: Guest appearances in episode 63.
- Ultraman: Great Monster Decisive Battle, Ultraman Story, Ultraman Zoffy: Ultra Warriors vs. the Giant Monster Army, Ultraman vs. Kamen Rider: All these movies used Leo's stock footage in the original series.
- Ultraman Mebius: Appeared in episode 1, 34, and 50. Ultraman Leo returns in Ultraman Mebius episode 34, "A Man Without a Home to help", in his human form Gen Ohtori. He trained and helped Mebius to defeat Alien Reflect.
- Mega Monster Battle: Ultra Galaxy, Ultra Galaxy Legend Side Story: Ultraman Zero vs. Darklops Zero, Ultraman Zero: The Revenge of Belial and Ultraman Saga: See here
- Ultraman Ginga, Ultraman Ginga S The Movie and Ultra Fight Victory: See here
- Ultraman X: See here
- Ultraman Geed: here

== International broadcast ==
- In Indonesia, Ultraman Leo aired on SCTV.
- In Thailand, Ultraman Leo first aired in 1995 on IBC7 (now called TrueVisions).

== Home media ==
=== Japan ===
In December 2018, Tsuburaya Productions and Bandai Namco Entertainment released the series on Blu-ray.

=== North America ===
In November 2014, the series, along with Ultraman Max and Ultraman Mebius, began streaming on Crunchyroll. In December 2017, the series was released on the streaming service Toku. In April 2018, Shout! Factory hosted a marathon event of the series on their streaming service Shout! Factory TV.

In July 2020, Shout! Factory announced to have struck a multi-year deal with Alliance Entertainment and Mill Creek, with the blessings of Tsuburaya and Indigo, that granted them the exclusive SVOD and AVOD digital rights to the Ultra series and films (1,100 TV episodes and 20 films) acquired by Mill Creek the previous year. Ultraman Leo, amongst other titles, will stream in the United States and Canada through Shout! Factory TV and Tokushoutsu.

It was released on Blu-ray in the United States on May 25, 2021 by Mill Creek.
