= Ultra Galaxy Legend Side Story: Ultraman Zero vs. Darklops Zero =

2010 Japanese superhero film

- Official poster
- Directed by: Hideki Oka
- Written by: Kenichi Araki
- Produced by: Hiroyasu Shibuya; Haruto Nakayoshi
- Starring: Shota Minami; Hiroyuki Konishi; Mitsutoshi Shundo; Tomomi Miyashita; Daisuke Terai; Hiroshi Suenaga; Mamoru Miyano; Ryu Manatsu
- Production company: Tsuburaya Productions
- Distributed by: Bandai Visual
- Release dates: November 26, 2010 (STAGE I); December 22, 2010 (STAGE II)
- Running time: 33 minutes per episode
- Country: Japan
- Language: Japanese

Ultra Galaxy Legend Side Story: Ultraman Zero vs. Darklops Zero (ウルトラ銀河伝説外伝 ウルトラマンゼロVSダークロプスゼロ, Urutora Ginga Densetsu Gaiden Urutoraman Zero Bui Esu Dākuropusu Zero) is a Japanese direct-to-video two part series, serving as a sequel of 2009 Ultra Series movie Mega Monster Battle: Ultra Galaxy. The series was released separately, Cosmic Collision (衝突する宇宙, Shōtotsu Suru Uchū) in November 26 and Zero's Life or Death Struggle (ゼロの決死圏, Zero no Kesshiken) on December 22, 2010. It is also served as a prologue to Ultraman Zero: The Revenge of Belial, and simultaneously promoting the film's release.

== Synopsis ==
=== Stage I: Cosmic Collision ===
Zero sits on a cliff while he watches a strange tower firing lightning bolts, and then rises to face against what it seemed to be members Ultra Brothers, Ultraman, Zoffy, Jack and Ace. After incapacitating the ZAP Spacy's Space Pendragon, Seven joined the group as they face against Zero.

Meanwhile, Rei and Hyuga sensed a distress signal from a nearby ZAP Spacy base. They dispatched on the Space Pendragon and track the signal's source from a recent space distortion, which successfully dragged their ship into it. After awakened, they find themselves within a subspace linked to multiple distortions. The distress signal from before triggers again but the source is revealed to be from another Space Pendragon within a strange planet. As they explore it, they spotted Ultraman Zero and several other Ultra Warriors while being chased by two mysterious objects before the Pendragon crash-landed. The two set on foot and track the source of the signal, which was revealed to be from a wrecked Space Pendragon and found an injured Kumano, as well as another Hyuga, revealing them to be the source of the signal. As Kumano disappears, the second Hyuga revealed that since the past two weeks, time distortions begin to appear out of nowhere. The alternate ZAP Spacy arrives on a planet and fights alongside Ultraman Zero but has reached their limit. After witnessing on what appears to be corpses of Ultraman Jack and Zoffy, the alt-Hyuga reveals that a strange force that resided in the factory they saw performs an experiment which causes multiple distortions to different universes appear. The alt-ZAP Spacy (Haruna and Oki included) slowly disappears due to their existence being abnormal, as the planet they stepped on becomes one that doesn't belong to any plane of existence. The facility produces nigh-unlimited supplies of fake Ultra Brothers, with their opponent Zero shall met his limit in any moment. In his final breath, the alt-Hyuga orders the prime ZAP Spacy to combine forces with Zero, destroying the facility and save the multiverse before disappearing.

Not long after, several warheads target Rei and Hyuga until Gomora shields them. The perpetrator reveals itself as a robotic copy of the same monster and managed to defeat the original Gomora. The perpetrator watches as she revealed that the robotic Gomora is built based on the original template, making it twice powerful than the original. Before the robot can finish off its template, Zero appeared and switch places with an injured Gomora to fight the fiend, giving Rei an opportunity to attack the alien factory with Litra. Seeing how Zero being able to defeat the mechanical Gomora, the alien leader Herodia sent the experimental robot equipped with their Techtor Gear. Before Zero can finish the robotic monster, he was interrupted by a strange mechanical figure and prompts to fight it. Rei tries to attack the alien factory but was shielded by a barrier and caught in an attack by the battle-damaged mechanical Gomora. Hyuga tries to help but gets caught in a crossfire between Zero and the Techtor Gear warrior. The mechanical warrior destroys his Techtor Gear by his own will and reveal himself as Darklops Zero and defeated his original template. Reinforcements arrived in the form of mechanical copies of Ultraman, Seven and Ace while Darklops banishes Zero and the impostor Ultra Brothers to a different subspace.

=== Stage II: Zero's Life or Death Struggle ===
Zero's Zero Twin Sword drifted in outer space after his defeat by Darklops Zero until it was claimed by Utraman Leo.

Meanwhile, Zero finds himself trapped within a dimensional gap and faced against an impostor Ace. Following the battle, Darklops Zero was restrained once more by Herodia, remembering a figure named "Kaiser Belial" before deactivating. Rei was restrained after his failed attempt to intrude the alien base but was rescued by none other than his alternate self. Unlike the prime Rei, alt-Reimon was never able to control his powers, forced into the state of Reionic Burst until the original Rei punched Reimon, thus deactivating its Reionic Burst mode. Rei revealed that he lost his Raybrad instinct after Hyuga threw Seven's Eye Slugger, creating a scar on his chest which symbolizes the former's friendship with ZAP Spacy members. While searching for Rei, Hyuga instead finds his Neo Battlenizer and an entrance to the alien base made by Litra. Although the fake Ace was destroyed, Zero try to find an escaped but was halted by Seven and Ultraman impostors.

Arriving at the launch facility, Rei and alt-Reimon discover an army of mass-produced Ultra Brothers and met Herodia, the Alien Salome that also stole Reimon's Battlenizer to create Mecha Gomora. Despite being unstable, but Darklops Zero's dimension core is successfully held in the Alien Salome's control, allowing them to send an army of fake Ultra Brothers to various universes. With Zero at his limits, Leo arrives to his aid while reminding his student of the harsh training he previously faced. Hyuga appears and gives Rei the Neo Battlenizer, summoning Gomora to stop the Salome's plans while a repaired Mecha Gomora was sent to fight the Battlenizer monster as well. Herodia tries to get her servants to work but was captured by Darklops Zero while her servants died from their base's rubble. Darklops proceed to destroy the entire factory and reprimand his captor of how living organisms being selfish before she fell from a great height. In order to escape the dimensional gap, Leo told his student to re-enact his and Astra's Double Flasher, which they succeeded and at the same time destroying the fake Ultraman and Seven. In her final breath, Herodia revealed to Hyuga that Darklops Zero was a creation of unknown force, as they only salvaged the robot when it was shown floating in outer space.

Darklops Zero marches towards the Gomoras' conflict, and successfully reprograms the rogue Mecha Gomora to his servitude as they overpower the original Gomora until Zero arrives. Seeing how Mecha Gomora being a product of his Battlenizer, alt-Reimon proceed to help Rei controlling his Gomora while Zero arrives just in time to assist the monster against their doppelgängers. After Mecha Gomora's destruction, the alt-Reimon begins to disappear but because of their combined control of Gomora, memories of the original Rei was transferred to the alternate counterpart. This allows him to finally be free from Raybrad's instincts, thanking his prime counterpart before vanishing. With Darklops Zero at the verge of defeat, he reminds his counterpart that the actual threat shall appear from his own homeworld and prepares to self-destruct. Rei, Hyuga and Zero tries to escape as Planet Cheney and the entire subspace caught in a huge explosion.

After awakened, Rei and Hyuga found that they returned to their original universe and received a message from their original counterpart, having revived after Darklops Zero's destruction. As the Pendragon left, Zero saw them from behind and join his master.

== Production ==
The side story features the directorial debut of Hideki Oka, who would later direct several other medias of Ultra Series such as the first half of Ultra Zero Fight and Ultraman Saga. The design of Mecha Gomora was already made in conception but because of scheduling conflict with preparations for Revenge of Belial, Masayuki Gotou can only drew rough sketches and hand it over towards the modelling team to complete the rest of it. Being a copy of Gomora, Mecha Gomora is a tribute to Mechagodzilla and its fight with the original Gomora is a tribute to 1974 film Godzilla vs. Mechagodzilla. Before the Imitation Ultra Brothers appeared, the main enemy was proposed to be Pris-Ma from The Return of Ultraman.

== Cast ==
- Rei (レイ), Alternate Rei/Alternate Reimon (レイモン; Voice): Shota Minami (南 翔太, Shōta Minami)
- Hyuga (ヒュウガ, Hyūga), Alternate Hyuga: Hiroyuki Konishi (小西 博之, Konishi Hiroyuki)
- Alternate Kumano (クマノ): Mitsutoshi Shundo (俊藤 光利, Shundō Mitsutoshi)
- Alien Salome "Herodia" (サロメ星人ヘロディア, Sarome Seijin Herodia): Tomomi Miyashita (宮下 ともみ, Miyashita Tomomi)
- Irate (イラテ): Daisuke Terai (寺井 大介, Terai Daisuke)
- Ganaesu (ガナエス): Hiroshi Suenaga (末永 博志, Suenaga Hiroshi)
- Ultraman Zero (ウルトラマンゼロ, Urutoraman Zero; Voice), Darklops Zero (ダークロプスゼロ, Dākuropusu Zero; Voice): Mamoru Miyano (宮野 真守, Miyano Mamoru)
- Ultraman Leo (ウルトラマンレオ, Urutoraman Reo; Voice): Ryu Manatsu (真夏 竜, Manatsu Ryū)

== Theme song ==
- Atarashii Hikari (新しい光; "A New Light")
  - Lyrics: Hideki Tama (田靡 秀樹, Tama Hideki)
  - Composition & Arrangement: Takao Konishi (小西 貴雄, Konishi Takao)
  - Artist: Voyager (ボイジャー, Boijā)
  Verse 1 of this song is played in Stage I, and verse 2 of it is played in Stage II.
