= Ryū Manatsu =

Japanese actor, singer, and voice actor

Ryu Manatsu (真夏竜, Manatsu Ryū; born April 18, 1950 in Yokohama) is a Japanese actor, singer and voice actor perhaps best known for his role as Gen Ohtori/Ultraman Leo in the Ultraman Series. He performed the show's theme song heard in the first 13 episodes as well.

== Filmography ==
Film
Year	Title	Role	Notes
1987	Totto Channel		
1987	Wakarenu riyû		
1987	Code Name Black Cat o oe	Police Detective Katô	
2009	Mega Monster Battle: Ultra Galaxy	Ultraman Leo	Voice
2012	Ultraman Saga	Gen Otori	
2015	Autâman		
2016	Daikaijû mono	Doctor Saigo	
Television
Year	Title	Role	Notes
1974-1975	Ultraman Leo	Gen Ôtori / Ultraman Leo	51 episodes
1996	Hideyoshi	Sakai Tadatsugu	
1998	Tokugawa Yoshinobu	Tadayoshi Nakayama	
1999-2003	Kids War	Nobuhiko Tsumura	
2006	Ultraman Max	Police Officer	Episodes 33–34
2006	Ultraman Mebius	Gen Otori / Ultraman Leo	Episode 34
2008	Engine Sentai Go-onger	Toujirou Fuji	Episode 8
