= Ashizuri Suizokukan =

Japanese manga series

- Cover

足摺り水族館
- Genre: Slice of life
- Manga
- Written by: panpanya
- Published by: Shichigatsu Tsuitachi
- Published: August 30, 2013
- Volumes: 1

Ashizuri Suizokukan (足摺り水族館; "Ashizuri Aquarium") is a Japanese slice of life seinen manga series written and illustrated by panpanya. It was published by 1月と7月 (ichigatsu to shichigatsu) on August 30, 2013.

Two of the author's other works have been published in the United States, in English, by Denpa.

== Reception ==
It was number fourteen on the 2014 Kono Manga ga Sugoi! Top 20 Manga for Male Readers survey. It was also nominated for the 7th Manga Taishō, receiving 31 points and placing 9th among the ten nominees.
