= Ultraman Geed The Movie =

- Theatrical release poster

Japanese name
- Kanji: 劇場版 ウルトラマンジード つなぐぜ! 願い!!
Transcriptions
- Revised Hepburn: Gekijō-ban Urutoraman Jīdo Tsunagu ze! Negai!!
- Directed by: Koichi Sakamoto
- Written by: Toshizo Nemoto; Hirotaka Adachi
- Based on: Ultraman Geed by Koichi Sakamoto
- Produced by: Tsugumi Kitaura; Yukinobu Tsuruta
- Starring: Tatsuomi Hamada; Chihiro Yamamoto; Mayu Hasegawa; Yuta Ozawa; Yuika Motokariya; Kai Shishido; Jackie-chan; Takaya Aoyagi; Hideo Ishiguro
- Music by: Kenji Kawai
- Production company: Tsuburaya Productions
- Distributed by: Shochiku
- Release date: March 10, 2018
- Running time: 72 mins
- Country: Japan
- Language: Japanese

Ultraman Geed The Movie (劇場版 ウルトラマンジード つなぐぜ! 願い!!, Gekijō-ban Urutoraman Jīdo Tsunagu ze! Negai!!; also called "Ultraman Geed The Movie: Connect the Wishes!") is a 2018 Japanese superhero kaiju film, serving as the sequel and film adaptation of the 2017 Ultra Series television series Ultraman Geed. It was released in Japan on March 10, 2018.

The movie's advertising slogan is "Awaken! The strongest gene!!" (目覚めよ！最強の遺伝子！！, Mezameyo! Saikyō no idenshi!!)

== Plot ==
Gillvalis began his reign of terror by sending his Galactron to attack the residents of Planet Kushia. Guided by her father's will, Airu barely escaped to an ancient Earth.

Fast forward to the present day, Gillvalis' forces continue to attack various planets in order to search the "red steel" as Space Garrison and Ultimate Force Zero tried their best to fight back. On Earth, his loss from Galactron MK2 caused Riku to develop a sense of doubt towards his own capabilities. Juggler navigated the Nebula House residents and AIB duo Moa and Zenna towards Okinawa to find the "red steel". They encountered Leito among the crowds, who lead them to the tourist guide Airu and finally the "red steel" itself, but neither of them were capable of wielding it. When Galactron MK2 commence attack on the party, Airu summoned Gukuru Shisa to stall the robot, therefore revealing her true identity as a Kushia People (クシア人, Kushia Jin). In order to gather more info, the team ventured into a secret alien city to find the information broker Arlong, where Gai Kurenai joined them after saving the party in a bar brawl between aliens. Gai met his junior Riku for the first time and counseled the boy of the responsibilities in being an Ultra Warrior.

As Gillvalis prepare to reset all life on Earth, Gai/Orb and Riku/Geed fought against Galactron MK2 but even with Zero's intervention, none of their attacks were capable of dealing even a single scratch. With Orb and Zero's apparent demise, Geed gave into his anger and defeated the robot enforcer in full power. With Riku knocked out of transformation and required another 20 hours to transform, Gillvalis prepared to digitize all life on Earth while the Galactron Army commenced their worldwide attack. Juggler took matters by fighting in his giant form while the rest of the party deal with Valis Raiders. Orb and Zero appeared unharmed after the latter used his time manipulation and bonded with Leito to assume Zero Beyond. The death of Airu from a Galactron's firepower served as the final push for Riku to unlock the "red steel" as Giga Finalizer. By assuming Ultimate Final, Geed bypassed his cool down period and helped the others exterminating the remaining Galactron Army. With Juggler exhausted, the Ultras storm Planet Kushia where Gillvalis assumed his Perfect Form to deal with the invaders. Orb and Zero destroyed his body, leaving Geed to finally destroy his escaping probe and put an end to his reign of terror permanently.

In aftermath of the battle, the returned humans and Gukuru Shisa celebrated Geed's victory while the Nebula House residents bid farewell to Ultimate Force Zero. Following Gai and Juggler's departure in the mid-credit scene, Zenna paid his final respect to Gukuru in its petrified form. Moa caught his partner's attention by revealing Airu's presence in the Pacific Records.

== Production ==
The original filming took place in September 2017 within Okinawa Prefecture, according to guest actor Yuika Motokariya. The news of Ultraman Geed The Movie' was firstly announced by November 23, 2017 with May J. singing the film's ending theme. The first trailer was aired on November 30, 2017, followed by the list of cast and plot summary of the movie.

== Cast ==
- Riku Asakura (朝倉 リク, Asakura Riku)/Ultraman Geed (ウルトラマンジード, Urutoraman Jīdo; Voice): Tatsuomi Hamada (濱田 龍臣, Hamada Tatsuomi)
- Laiha Toba (鳥羽 ライハ, Toba Raiha): Chihiro Yamamoto (山本 千尋, Yamamoto Chihiro)
- Moa Aizaki (愛崎 モア, Aizaki Moa): Mayu Hasegawa (長谷川 眞優, Hasegawa Mayu)
- Alien Shadow "Zenna" (シャドー星人 ゼナ, Shadō Seijin Zena; Human): Hideyoshi Iwata (岩田 栄慶, Iwata Hideyoshi)
- Leito Igaguri (伊賀栗 レイト, Igaguri Reito): Yuta Ozawa (小澤 雄太, Ozawa Yūta)
- Airu Higa (Airu Saderuna) (比嘉 愛琉（アイル・サデルーナ）, Higa Airu (Airu Saderūna)): Yuika Motokariya (本仮屋 ユイカ, Motokariya Yuika)
- Buran Saderuna (ブラン・サデルーナ, Buran Saderūna): Kai Shishido (宍戸 開, Shishido Kai)
- Alien Jaki "Arlong" (ジャキ星人 アーロン, Jaki Seijin Āron): Jackie-chan (ジャッキーちゃん, Jakkī-chan)
- Bartender: Nobuyuki Kase (加瀬 信行, Kase Nobuyuki)
- Newscaster: Chisato Kawai (川合 千里, Kawai Chisato)
- Academician: Ken Okada (岡田 謙, Okada Ken)
- Praying women: Katsue Yokoyama (横山 克枝, Yokoyama Katsue), Hiromi Miyazato (宮里 弘美, Miyazato Hiromi), Seiko Tani (谷 聖子, Tani Seiko)
- Jugglus Juggler (ジャグラスジャグラー, Jagurasu Jagurā): Takaya Aoyagi (青柳 尊哉, Aoyagi Takaya)
- Gai Kurenai (クレナイ・ガイ, Kurenai Gai)/Ultraman Orb (ウルトラマンオーブ, Urutoraman Ōbu; Voice): Hideo Ishiguro (石黒 英雄, Ishiguro Hideo)

=== Voice cast ===
- RE.M. (レム, Remu): Suzuko Mimori (三森 すずこ, Mimori Suzuko)
- Alien Pegassa "Pega" (ペガッサ星人 ペガ, Pegassa Seijin Pega): Megumi Han (潘 めぐみ, Han Megumi)
- Alien Shadow "Zenna": Shintarō Asanuma (浅沼 晋太郎, Asanuma Shintarō)
- Ultraman Zero (ウルトラマンゼロ, Urutoraman Zero): Mamoru Miyano (宮野 真守, Miyano Mamoru)
- Gillvalis (ギルバリス, Girubarisu): Katsuyuki Konishi (小西 克幸, Konishi Katsuyuki)
- Mother of Ultra (ウルトラの母, Urutora no Haha): Masako Ikeda (池田 昌子, Ikeda Masako)
- Zoffy (ゾフィー, Zofī): Hideyuki Tanaka (田中 秀幸, Tanaka Hideyuki)
- Mirror Knight (ミラーナイト, Mirā Naito): Hikaru Midorikawa (緑川 光, Midorikawa Hikaru)
- Jean-Bot (ジャンボット, Jan Botto): Hiroshi Kamiya (神谷 浩史, Kamiya Hiroshi)
- Glenfire (グレンファイヤー, Gurenfaiyā): Tomokazu Seki (関 智一, Seki Tomokazu)
- Jean-Nine (ジャンナイン, Jan Nain): Miyu Irino (入野 自由, Irino Miyu)
- Alien Nackle (ナックル星人, Nakkuru Seijin): Tetsuo Kishi (岸 哲生, Kishi Tetsuo)
- Lecuum (レキューム人, Rekyūmu-jin): Holly Kaneko (金子 はりい, Kaneko Harii)
- Father of Ultra (ウルトラの父, Urutora no Chichi): Tokuma Nishioka (西岡 德馬, Nishioka Tokuma)

== Theme song ==
- "Kizuna ∞ Infinity" (絆∞Infinity, Kizuna ∞ Infiniti; lit. "Bonds ∞ Infinity")
  - Lyrics: Yukinojo Mori (森 雪之丞, Mori Yukinojō)
  - Composition: Hiroki Horiko (堀向 彦輝, Horikō Hiroki)
  - Arrangement: Kohsuke Oshima (大島 こうすけ, Ōshima Kōsuke)
  - Artist: May J.
