= List of Ultraman Geed episodes =

This is the episode list of Ultraman Geed (ウルトラマンジード, Urutoraman Jīdo), a Japanese tokusatsu television series produced by Tsuburaya Productions that is set to be aired on TV Tokyo on July 8, 2017. The series is simulcasted outside Japan by Crunchyroll.

At the end of each episode, a minisode called Ultra Capsule Navi (ウルトラカプセルナビ, Urutora Kapuseru Nabi) aired and featuring Riku Asakura described the Ultra Capsule and Monster Capsule of said episode. In Tsuburaya's official YouTube channel, Pega would host the Ultraman Geed Action File (ウルトラマンジード アクションファイル, Urutoraman Jīdo Akushon Fairu) and demonstrate the transformation techniques of Riku into Geed.

== Episodes ==
No.	Title	Written by	Original release date
SP	"Ultraman Geed Preview Special"; Transliteration: "Urutoraman Jīdo Chokuzen Supesharu" (Japanese: ウルトラマンジード直前スペシャル)	Junichiro Ashiki	July 1, 2017
A brief description of the series. Aside from introducing the cast, it also reviews on the rivalry between Ultraman Zero and Ultraman Belial ever since their debut.
1	"Welcome to the Secret Base"; Transliteration: "Himitsu Kichi e Yōkoso" (Japanese: 秘密基地へようこそ)	Hirotaka Adachi	July 8, 2017
Years after Ultraman Belial mysteriously disappeared when his attempt to wipe out the universe failed, a young man named Riku Asakura was minding his business with his secret Pegassian roommate Pega when the city comes under attack by a giant monster which destroyed both his home and grocery store where he worked. Riku's boss Haruo Kume decides to move to his sister Yoshiko Hara's father-in-law's house where she and her daughter Eri went to prior to the attack. The monster disappeared without a trace soon after. The following night, Riku decides to spend the night at the astronomical observatory where he was found as a child. But he and Pega stumbled into an underground base where the operation system, who gets named "RE.M.", analyzed Riku as the owner of the base while revealing he is not human. When the monster Skull Gomora resurfaces and is advances towards where Haruo's family is, Riku is presented with the Geed Riser and Ultra Capsules needed to assume his true form and stop the monster. As Riku becomes Ultraman Geed and defeats Skull Gomora, RE.M. reveals to Pega that Riku's father is Ultraman Belial. This episode's segment for Ultra Capsule Navi features the Capsules of Ultraman and Gomora.
2	"The Girl Who Cuts Monsters"; Transliteration: "Kaijū o Kiru Shōjo" (Japanese: 怪獣を斬る少女)	Hirotaka Adachi	July 15, 2017
Following the public's negative opinions toward Ultraman Geed on the news, Riku decides not to transform again while getting a call from Haruo that his family moved to Eri's paternal grandfather's warehouse after strange events involving her. Riku and Pega decide to check things out and witness an alien called Dada being chased by a swordswoman. When Pega reveals the Dada has Eri in a capsule, Riku helps save Eri and drive the alien off. The swordswoman, introducing herself as Laiha Toba, explains that Eri is being targeted by aliens and monsters because she possesses a light called a Little Star inside her body. Before Riku can inquire of Laiha hunting down a man that can turn into a monster, Skull Gomora appears as they take Eri back to her family. While the others run, Riku finds himself unable to move as Pega reasons that Riku unconsciously wants to protect everyone despite being Belial's child. Riku transforms into Geed and musters the strength to defeat Skull Gomora as Eri prays for him. This causes the Little Star to leave Eri's body and enter Geed, giving Riku the Ultraman Leo Capsule. Riku then learns that Laiha witnessed his transformation, with him and Pega convincing her to live with them in their base which they christen the Nebula House after their previous home. Soon after, Riku runs an errand for Haruo to pick up a scifi novel by his boss's favorite author Kei Fukuide. It was by chance by Riku crosses path with Kei, who is the mastermind behind the monster attacks. This episode's segment for Ultra Capsule Navi features the Capsules of Ultraman Belial and Red King.
3	"Salaryman Zero"; Transliteration: "Sararīman Zero" (Japanese: サラリーマンゼロ)	Hirotaka Adachi	July 22, 2017
Geed is battling a Darklops Zero when an Ultraman appears and drives it off before being shocked to see Geed's resemblance to Belial. The Ultraman is further shocked to see Geed revert to Riku as Laiha and Pega get him to safety. Before the Ultraman could follow, he notices a salaryman named Leito Igaguri risking his well being in an attempt to protect a boy before he was hit by a speeding truck. Touched by Leito's bravery, and since he needs to heal, the Ultraman decides to merge into the human and form a mutual symbiosis to ensure their survival. At the Nebula House, after learning the Ultraman is Belial's mortal enemy Ultraman Zero, Riku decides to have RE.M. send a message to convince the public that he is not an enemy. Riku and Laiha are then alerted by Pega that the boy that Leito was attempting to save, Toru Honda, is a Little Star. The next day, after met his host's family, Zero informs Leito of Crisis Impact and how Ultraman King sacrificed himself by scattering his essence across the universe to restore it. Zero adds that he was sent to retrieve the Ultra Capsules that were stolen from the Land of Light. Meanwhile, Riku and Laiha find Toru as Kei summons a Darklops Zero to lure out Zero. Riku transforms into Geed to hold it while Laiha gets Toru to safety, only for Kei to summon two more Darklops Zeros. But when Toru cheers for Geed by name, he obtains the Ultraseven Capsule. At RE.M.'s request, Riku uses the Ultraseven and Leo Capsules to become Ultraman Geed Solid Burning. With Zero seeing the Ultraman become a fusion of his mentor and father, Geed proceeds to defeat the Darklops Zeros with ease. Later, as Riku meets Toru while Leito. This episode's segment for Ultra Capsule Navi features the Capsules of Ultraman Leo and Darklops Zero.
4	"A Job Where You Investigate Aliens"; Transliteration: "Seijin o Ō Shigoto" (Japanese: 星人を追う仕事)	Hirotaka Adachi	July 29, 2017
As Riku convinces Laiha to loan him money to buy a bicycle, mentioning his childhood friend works for the Nico Nico Life Insurance company, Moa Aizaki is actually an Agent of the Alien Investigation Bureau as she and her Shadow Alien partner Zenna deport a Hook Alien for smuggling the sleep-inducing Lugus Plant to Earth. The two are altered to a scientist from planet Pitt on Earth named Tree-Tip who caused an incident while running, making it their goal to bring her in while ensuring the populace are unaware of aliens on Earth. Once Riku bought his bike, it is quickly stolen by Tree-Tip and sensing a Little Star from her. Riku convinces Moa to let her ride in Car Z after Tree-Tip, forced to remain behind as Laiha alerts him to an Eleking approaching. As Riku becomes Geed and battles Eleking, Tri reveals that the Eleking was from a Pitt invasion she averted out of love for Earth and that she was luring the monster away from suburbia as it senses the Little Star inside her body. When Tri pleas the two AIB agents to leave her after the Eleking stuns Geed, Moa instead uses the Lugus Plant she failed to place in evidence to disorientate the monster with her and Zenna knocked out. Geed assumes Solid Burning form to destroy Eleking as Tri pleas the Ultraman to quickly put the monster out of its misery, her Little Star entering Geed in the form of Hikari Capsule while Kei extracts Eleking's remains to create a Monster Capsule. Sometime after Tree-Tip is inducted into the AIB, Moa meets Laiha and jumps to conclusions over their relation while Riku notices Leito. It was then that Zero takes over Leito's body to formally introduce himself to the youth, promising that they will discuss things later. This episode's segment for Ultra Capsule Navi features the Capsules of Ultraseven and Eleking.
5	"Partners"; Transliteration: "Aikata" (Japanese: あいかた)	Uiko Miura	August 5, 2017
After RE.M. compiles the data on the Little Stars from the group's experience, Riku assumes the best way to find more Little Stars is by watching TV. By chance, they see a news broadcast of a comedian named Takashi Arai who claims to have healing powers. Riku and Laiha find Takashi as he was confronted by Leito, learning that the young man was exploiting a Lunar he named Moco who is the real Little Star. Takashi adds that Moco was confiscated by a member of the department of health as an Arstron appears and goes on a rampage after Moco, who is in Moa's custody before it escapes her. Riku becomes Geed in time to save Moa from the monster as Takashi finds Moco after it got itself trapped in a fish net, refusing to abandon his partner as Geed is placed at a disadvantage by Arstron being near gas tanks. But once freed by Takashi, Moco causes its Little Star to enter Geed's body, giving Riku the Ultraman Cosmos Capsule that he uses with the Hikari Capsule to become Ultraman Geed Acro Smasher. Geed manages to pacifying Arstron, convincing the monster to return to its underground dwelling. Soon after, due to Laiha poking holes in her cover story and the Lunar constantly returning to Takashi, Moa decides to let Moco stay with the human while thinking how good it can be if all humans and Extraterrestrials can co-exist. Later, with only two Little Stars left to find, Kei decides to hasten events by using his newly gained Eleking Capsule with the Ace Killer Capsule to become the Belial Fusion Monster Thunder Killer and lure Geed into a fight. This episode's segment for Ultra Capsule Navi features the Capsules of Ultraman Hikari and Arstron.
6	"So That I Can Be Me"; Transliteration: "Boku ga Boku de Aru Koto" (Japanese: 僕が僕であること)	Uiko Miura	August 12, 2017
Leito watches Geed being overpowered by Thunder Killer before Zero hijacks his host to aid Geed before the monster runs off. After Leito is being formally introduced to Pega after helping get Riku into the Nebula House, Laiha using a device RE.M. made to directly talk to Zero, Riku is depressed over his loss and Zero's popularity as Leito admits he enjoyed fighting as an Ultraman. Riku is offended as he claims that being an Ultraman is harder compared to a salaryman, he and Leito getting at each other's throats before Laiha suggests the two switch places. RE.M. provides a device that would allow Riku to assume Leito's appearance as he and Pega head to Leito's workplace, only for Riku to realize it was not easy as he assumed. Leito has the same realization while living a day in Riku's shoes, the two apologizing to each other the following day. Leito explains that he found someone protecting when he married and started a family, advising Riku to find someone to cherish and protect. Later, Riku learns from Laiha that Thunder Killer might have been targeting him and confronts the monster when RE.M. alerts them to its reappearance. Though overpowered, Riku's desire to find someone worth protecting allows him to manifest the Geed Claw which he used in Acro Smasher form to destroy Thunder Killer. Later, as Riku undergoes training under Laiha to better use his weapon, Kei visits the unconscious body of Belial to be reinvigorated by the Ultraman's power. Kei then decides to deal with Zero. This episode's segment for Ultra Capsule Navi features the Capsules of Ultraman Cosmos and Ace Killer.
7	"Sacrifice"; Transliteration: "Sakurifaisu" (Japanese: サクリファイス)	Sachio Yanai	August 19, 2017
While Riku and Laiha work at the Ginga Market, with Haruo depressed over not winning a drawing to attend Kei's lecture, Leito arrives with his family before the author himself appears. He invites everyone present to his lecture as guests, with Laiha wary of him with Zero following suit as Leito later read one of Kei's books. The following day on the lecture, with Pega leaving after being frighten by Kei's presence, Zero confides to Riku that Kei's stories are an inversed telling of his own adventures while warning the youth to be on his guard. During the lecture, he explains his intend to kill the character of Zora in his next work while calling Leito to the stage. Zero takes over Leito's body to confront Kei, who tells him not to make a move for what will happen next. Though acting out a scene to explain the building is rigged to explode should Zero act against him, Kei proceeds to summons a Galactron. As Riku becomes Geed to fight Galactron, Laiha unable to kill him as he arranged the lecture to be taped, Kei explains no one needs to die if Zero sacrifices himself. Zero reluctantly accepts the terms as he is allowed to run outside to be obliterated by Galactron, separating himself from Leito's body to protect him from the blast with his Ultra Zero Eye NEO turned to stone. This episode's segment for Ultra Capsule Navi features the Capsules of Ultraman Orb: Specium Zeperion and Galactron.
8	"Going Beyond Fate"; Transliteration: "Unmei o Koeteike" (Japanese: 運命を越えて行け)	Sachio Yanai	August 26, 2017
Geed goes berserk over Zero's demise, yet is powerless as Kei orders Galactron to shutdown as the Ultraman reverts to human form. Kei then releases his hostages before taking his leave. At the Nebula House, with RE.M. unable to detect Zero's presence within Leito, Riku was about to go after Kei with Laiha attempting to stop him from risking his life. Leito blames himself for Zero's demise and admits that he is deathly afraid and leaves the Zero Eye in the Nebula House as he intends to get his family out of town. While the others, Riku is confident that Zero will return and do his best until then. The next day, Kei reactivates Galactron to call Riku out. As the Igaguri family pack up, Leito leaves Rumina to get Mayu got of town while he remains to do what he can to protect their home. Arriving as Geed fight Galactron, Leito sees Laiha as she gives him back the Zero Eye. Leito's desire to protect everyone revives Zero as the Ultraman takes over to join Geed in fighting Galactron together. Kei responds by summoning another Galactron to even the playing field, with Zero dealing with it while Geed fights the first one. Things seem hopeless when Ultraman Hikari appears before Zero to give him and Leito their own Riser and New Generation Ultra Capsules. Zero combines his Zero Eye and Riser to use New Generation Capsules and become Ultraman Zero Beyond as he and Geed Acro Smasher proceed to destroy the Galactrons. Later, after Leito tearfully apologizes to Riku and Laiha for running out on them, he is reunited with his family. This episode's segment for Ultra Capsule Navi features the Capsules of New Generation Alpha (Ultraman Ginga and Ultraman Orb: Orb Origin) and New Generation Beta (Ultraman Victory and Ultraman X).
9	"The Sword of an Oath"; Transliteration: "Chikai no Tsurugi" (Japanese: 誓いの剣)	Uiko Miura	September 2, 2017
Called by Leito to meet him at Motohoshi Park, Riku and Laiha learn that Mayu manifested teleportation abilities. Laiha uses RE.M.'s system to confirm Mayu is a Little Star as notes that both monsters and Kei would target the girl as a result, Zero setting up a plan for him and Laiha to capture him alive to interrogate him on his connections to Belial. Though Mayu refused to willingly stay in the Nebula House, Laiha managed to convince her to return and befriend Pega. The group are then alerted to a Tyrant attempted to dig its way to them, with Geed intercepting the monster. But the group is then alerted to Skull Gomora appearing at Mt. Mitsuse, with Zero taking over the fight against the Tyrant while Geed faces Skull Gomora. At the same time, while she and the AIB investigate the inconsistencies behind Kei, Moa finds a leger on one of the first monster attacks that details it to have occurred on Mt. Mitsuse with Laiha a survivor of the incident. As Skull Gomora is defeated, Laiha finds a concerned Mayu behind her and pleas her to stay while she confronts Kei. Riku soon learns from Mayu that Laiha was a Little Star who lost her powers on the day that her parents were killed by Kei as Skull Gomora. Riku and Leito arrive as they find Laiha about to kill Kei, only to stop at the pleas of a voice. Kei takes his leave while revealing himself as a Sturm Alien to Riku's group, as well as Moa and Zenna who is more invested in Leito. Later at the Nebula House, after Laiha reveals what stayed her hand in her attempt on Kei's life, Riku expresses gladness that she did not go through with it. This episode's segment for Ultra Capsule Navi features the Capsules of Ultraman Ginga and Tyrant.
10	"I Read Minds"; Transliteration: "Kokoro Yomemasu" (Japanese: ココロヨメマス)	Misaki Morie	September 9, 2017
Zenna summons AIB agent Nabia from planet Zobetai, to deal with a Zandrias by using her powers to read the monster's mind to learn what he wants, only for the Zandrias to burrow to hundred meters underground. Deciding to go by the Earth alias Satoko with free time, Nabia attempts to find a boyfriend with Moa attempting to keep her out of trouble with her annoyance towards humans being dishonest. When Nabia learns Moa's feelings for Riku, she offers her help and deduced him as an alien as Leito and Mayu arrive with Nabia shattering Mayu's dream of finding a prince to Moa's dismay. Moa is then alerted that the Zandrias resurfaced as she takes Nabia to its location so she can use her powers on him. Riku also arrived and learned of Moa being an AIB agent before transforming himself into Geed to save her and Nabia from a gust produced by the Zandrias. Geed finds himself overwhelmed by Zandrias before Zero arrives, giving Nabia the opening to reveal the monster is actually a child unable to leave Earth to be with his mate. Before things can escalate from Zandrias's tantrum and Zero losing his patience, Moa manages to reach the monster and convince him to fight for love. Zero then assumes Beyond form to send Zandrias flying into outer space where he is reunited with his mate. Later, now that learned each other's secrets, Riku and Moa decide to act like nothing happened. As Leito returns to pick up Mayu, he is being watched by Zenna. This episode's segment for Ultra Capsule Navi features the Capsules of Ultraman X and Zandrias.
11	"The Geed Identity"; Transliteration: "Jīdo Aidentitī" (Japanese: ジードアイデンティティー)	Hirotaka Adachi	September 15, 2017
While talking to his publisher about the details of his next work, Kei uses telepathy to communicate with Belial before he is alerted that the AIB are tracing him. Kei dispatches the surrounding AIB agents before leaving his publisher to enact the next phase of his plan immaturely. Later, Leito is abducted by Moa and Zenna who inform Zero of what they learned from tailing Kei as they need his help to reach Belial's location despite Leito's insistence to get to work. After buying a vacuum, Laiha forcing him when he bought a PlayStation, Riku encounters Kei when Laiha is kept at by a Bado sniper. Kei reveals to Riku that he created the young man from a sample of Belial's genetic material and orchestrated his life to have him retrieve the Ultra Capsules. While he intended to make his move after Riku retrieve the last Ultra Capsule, the AIB's interference forced Kei to retrieve the Ultra Capsules so they can be used to restore Belial. When Laiha manages to corner the Bado after Pega distracts him. Kei decides to teach Riku a lesson by leveling the town as Pedanium Zetton. Though Geed intercepts Pedanium Zetton, he is defeated while their battle devastated the town. Kei takes the Ultra Capsules from Riku, kept from killing him by Laiha while losing the Zero Capsule as he falls back. Later, as Riku is depressed before RE.M. announces a letter for the Nebula House, Zero finds a wormhole at the coordinates and ventures in. Belial, expressing disappointment in Kei, gives the Sturm a final chance by instructing him to absorb the Ultra Capsules in his possession. Kei obeys, causing him to transform in more powerful version of Pedanium Zetton. This episode's segment for Ultra Capsule Navi features the Capsules of Ultraman Zero and King Joe.
12	"My Name"; Transliteration: "Boku no Namae" (Japanese: 僕の名前)	Hirotaka Adachi	September 23, 2017
After absorbing the stolen Ultra Capsules, Kei goes on a rampage as Pedanium Zetton before being knocked out by his own power. Riku takes his leave, revealing to Pega that the letter is from someone with his surname. Once arriving to the address, Riku meets an old terminally ill man named Sui Asakura whom he learns to be a Little Star whose powers allowed him to deduce Riku's identity as Geed. Sui explains that he sent letter to Riku to meet him, revealing that he gave the boy his name and is suffering from a terminal illness. Eventually, Pedanium Zetton regains consciousness while sensing Sui and instinctively pursues. After an attempt to get Sui to safety fails, revealing to Riku that he will meet Belial in the near future when Earth's survival is on the line, the old man pleas Riku to leave him. But Riku could not and Sui's pleas cause his Little Star to transfer into Riku in the form of the Father of Ultra Capsule. Using his new Capsule with the Zero Capsule, Riku transforms into Ultraman Geed Magnificent and battles Pendenium Zetton as the maddened Kei's consciousness slowly resurfaces. With Kei yelling at Riku that he is nothing but a Belial replica, Riku refuses to accept that while expressing pity towards the Sturm before destroying Pendenium Zetton with the absorbed Ultra Caspules reclaimed. Soon after, Riku makes regular visits to Sui's home to spend time with him while possible. Meanwhile, fighting off the tendrils that his nemesis set up, Zero decides to close the portal to trap Belial. But as Kei loses consciousness upon returning to Belial's dimension from his body's reaction, Belial considers Zero's act to be only a minor delay. This episode's segment for Ultra Capsule Navi features the Capsules of Father of Ultra and Zetton.
13	"Restore Memories"; Transliteration: "Resutoa Memorīzu" (Japanese: レストア・メモリーズ)	Junichiro Ashiki	September 30, 2017
Riku and Pega were goofing around while playing baseball inside the Nebula House. RE.M. had warned them to be pessimistic but during their game, the ball hits RE.M., causing her to malfunction which leads to loses all of her memories. In order to make RE.M. regain her memories, Riku explains about the Ultra Capsules and Geed Riser along with the previous events that had happened. A recap episodes from 1 to 12.
14	"Shadows of Shadows"; Transliteration: "Shadō no Kage" (Japanese: シャドーの影)	Toshizo Nemoto	October 7, 2017
Invited to the Nebula House by Riku, Moa gets her mind blown when she is formally introduced to Pega while relieved that Riku and Laiha are not a couple. Later having picnic with the group, Moa admits that her superior Zenna has been acting strangely lately. Zero reveals himself as he explains that Zenna's people were once a warlike race until Belial's war scattered them across the cosmos. Moa considers Zero being prejudiced as he advised her to talk to Zenna himself about his past. But Moa learns that Zenna left for another planet as a Shadow named Kuruto is assigned as her temporary partner, the two getting into a discussion over Zenna. The next day, as Riku woke up from a strange dream, Moa sees Kuruto taking an item from AIB HQ before he teleports to another part of the city. Kuruto proceeds to summon the living weapon Dimensional Demolition Lord Zegun before being confronted by Zenna, who is revealed to have been held captive until he escaped. Moa arrives with Zenna revealing Kuruto as his pupil, Kuruto revealing his intent to restore the Shadow race to its former glory as he merges into Zegun's body. Geed confronts Zegun and is joined by Zero as they learn of their opponent's ability to send whatever its beam obliterates to another dimension. Geed transforms to Magnificent to stop Zegun, but their attack cause a vortex that would have sucked the city in until Zero Beyond forces himself between the attacks and knocks them back. Zegun is removed from reality by its own attack with Moa sucked into the vortex despite Zenna's attempt to save her. This episode's segment for Ultra Capsule Navi features the Capsules of Ultraman Orb: Orb Origin and Zegun.
15	"Child of Battle"; Transliteration: "Tatakai no Ko" (Japanese: 戦いの子)	Toshizo Nemoto	October 14, 2017
Finding Riku and informing him that Zegun's gone, he, Laiha, and Zero are found by Zenna who deduced Riku as Geed while revealing Moa to be missing. While Riku and Laiha scan Moa's whereabouts in the Nebula House, Zenna explains his past and the Gabra Cano child soldiers he trained like Kuruto to Zero. Zenna also admits that he considered destroying Zegun's remote control before deciding to keep it as a countermeasure should Belial return. Meanwhile, Moa tends to Kuruto's injuries to his astonishment as he confessed to using her. When asked why she's a member of the AIB, Moa reveals that Zenna recruited her when he saw her tend to a wounded alien while in high school and joined after learning the AIB's mission to restore the peace that Belial disrupted. The two are then found by the others, Zenna attempting to convince Kuruto to stop. But Kuruto refuses as he summons Zegun once its power has been restored. Geed and Zero proceed to fight Zegun while reasoning with Kuruto, only to be overpowered as they assume their strongest forms and create a barrier around Zegun. But Kuruto continues Zegun continue to fire its beam, resulting in his death when the monster overloads. Later, as Zero checks on Zenna, Riku learns from a grieving Moa that she intends to continue fighting for betterment of humans and aliens. This episode's segment for Ultra Capsule Navi features the Capsules of Ultraman Victory and Kaiser Belial.
16	"The First Day of the End of the World"; Transliteration: "Sekai no Owari ga Hajimaru Hi" (Japanese: 世界の終わりが始まる日)	Hirotaka Adachi	October 21, 2017
While Riku watching an episode of Don Shine, he is put down by the news of Geed being a potential enemy to humanity. Noticing Laiha running off, Riku learns that Little Star powers are re-manifesting. With AIB confirming this as they take her to a safe house in the Kajio district where the other Little Stars are, Laiha reveals a voice in her head told her that Belial is coming. As Riku reveals this information to Zero and receives advice from him, Laiha learns that her powers were sealed after her parents' death and that the Little Stars' creation was Kei's doing. But the Godola AIB member Godo Wynn reveals his true colors when he and his fellow Godola attempted to abduct the Little Stars to restore their race's former glory. While Zenna defeated his opponent, Godo enlarged himself after being subdued by Laiha with Geed facing him while Laiha and Moa take the children to safety. But Belial arrives on Earth, easily destroying Godo while intending to absorb Geed. When Zero intervenes and battles his nemesis in Beyond form, Geed forced him off so he can battle his father. But Belial uses Kei's Riser with the Five King and Zogu 2nd Form Capsules to Fusion Rise into Chimeraberus to overpower both Ultramen before absorbing Geed and flying off to the moon so he can completely assimilate his son's being uninterrupted. This episode's segment for Ultra Capsule Navi features the Capsules of Ultimate Zero and Zogu (Second form).
17	"The King's Miracle! Time to Change Fate!!"; Transliteration: "Kingu no Kiseki! Kaeru ze! Unmei!!" (Japanese: キングの奇跡！変えるぜ！運命！！)	Hirotaka Adachi	October 28, 2017
As everyone has no idea how to save Riku from being assimilated by Belial, Zero questions Laiha on the voice that only she can hear. He speculates the voice to be that of Ultraman King, advising her to go to the Tsutsui General Hospital: which built on the epicenter of the Crisis impact. There, Laiha meets King as he reveals that she became a Little Star because her parents' prayer for her to have no complications at birth. King also offers to project Laiha to Riku as Belial uses his illusions to metaphysically temp the youth to accept him as Zero physically confronts Chimeraberus and is overpowered. King defends Laiha from Belial as she reaches Riku, giving him the strength to escape Chimeraberus's body before knocking his father back to Earth. As Geed gains the people's support while battling Chimeraberus, Laiha transfers her Little Star to Riku in the form of the Ultraman King Capsule. Using it with the Belial Capsule, Riku creates the King Sword to become Ultraman Geed Royal Megamaster. Belial is livid over the turn of events as Geed destroys Chimeraberus while telling his father that he is the master of his own destiny. Geed gains the Jack, Ace, and Taro Ultra Capsules soon after. With Geed now fully accepted by everyone, Riku and his friends celebrate as a wounded Kei returns to Earth. This episode's segment for Ultra Capsule Navi features the Capsules of Ultraman King and Five King.
18	"Inheritor of the Dream"; Transliteration: "Yume o Tsugu Mono" (Japanese: 夢を継ぐ者)	Sachio Yanai	November 4, 2017
A week has passed since Belial's defeat as Riku frets over what sort of job he should take to help people before seeing a new report detailing Kei on the run for the murder of his editor Jōji Ōsumi. Soon after, the group having been gathering the scattered Monster Capsules to contain for universal security, Riku sees the AIB and Zero corner an amnesiac Kei as he and the city come under attack by a customized Legionoid piloted by a revenge-driven Dada bent on killing Kei for Belial's actions against his race. While Zero holds off the Legionoid in a space battle, Riku and Moa lose Kei thanks to an aspiring author who takes the amnesiac villain to her workplace in the mountain. Introducing herself as Arie Ishikari, she wishes to know his story from a nonbiased perspective and tries to help him remember. However, a weakened Zero is forced to bring the Legionoid back to Earth in the same area as Kei as the Dada opens fire on him and Arie. But this cases Kei to regain his memories of gaining purpose as Belial's servant as he intends to carry out his late master's desires in his place as he summons a Zaigorg to easily destroy the Dada and his Legionoid. When Riku arrives, Kei transforms into Thunder Killer with Geed fighting the two monsters as Royal Megamaster. Geed destroys Zaigorg with Lance Spark before defeating Thunder Killer with Storium Flasher, Kei found by Arie as she attempts to offer his assistance to write his story despite the man weakly lashing out at her. This episode's segment for Ultra Capsule Navi features the Capsules of Ultraman Taro and Zaigorg.
19	"Nebula House Invasion"; Transliteration: "Ubawareta Seiun-sō" (Japanese: 奪われた星雲荘)	Kyoko Katsuya	November 11, 2017
While being commented of gradually showing more human-like behavior, RE.M. scolds Riku for overfilling the Nebula House with Donshine merchandise. But the group come under attack when the still weakened Kei suddenly arrives to the Nebula House, with RE.M. sending the others to the surface before Kei deletes her before using the Nebula House's resources to heal himself. On the surface, Riku and the others find a woman who reveals herself as RE.M. in an android body. The group meet Moa to discuss how to get back the Nebula House, unaware that a fully healed Kei is observing them from an U-Tom. Bent on making Riku suffer, Kei has the U-Tom reprogram RE.M. to pilot a summoned Mecha Gomora to kill Riku. Riku to forced to fight RE.M. as Geed, only to be outmatched by Mecha Gomora as RE.M. provides the monster with her intel on Geed's fighting style. Riku's words gradually reach RE.M. as she meets an embodiment of her core programming who, while explaining her name means servant in the Sturm language, reveals that she has always belonged to Kei. But RE.M. refuses to accept her fate, mustering the strength to delete Kei's hold over her before transferring herself to the Nebula House to evict Kei. Geed then becomes Royal Megamaster and acts on RE.M.'s intel to target Mecha Gomora's neck to destroy it. Riku then arrives to the Nebula House, cleaning it up with his friends while revealing to RE.M. that he named her after a Donshine heroine. RE.M. explains that she now has full access to her databanks and reveals that Kei took the base to heal his Sturm Organ, which may cause trouble for the group in the long run. Elsewhere, Kei muses that the real nightmare will soon begin as he is picked up by Arie, who had kept Leito and Zero from coming to Riku's aid. This episode's segment for Ultra Capsule Navi features the Capsules of Ultraman Jack and Mecha Gomora.
20	"The 10:00 AM Monsterous Bird"; Transliteration: "Gozen Jū-ji no Kaichō" (Japanese: 午前10時の怪鳥)	Uiko Miura	November 18, 2017
For four straight days, Riku has been fighting a monster known as Star Bem Gyeron that appears in Hoshiyama on the stroke of 10:00 AM. While the group assumed they were fighting multiple Star Bem Gyerons for the first three days, they learn that they were fighting the same monster as they attempt to incinerate the remains. That proved to be a failed effort as the Star Bem Gyeron reforms itself on the fifth day from its remains evaporated, with Geed assuming Royal Megamaster form to destroy the monster. With the everyone annoyed, a vexed Riku takes a walk and runs into Moa who has a tracking device she uses to find Star Bem Gyeron's fragments. This led them to Mayu, who reveals that the fragment she acquired and her attempt to keep it from melting by placing it in a freezer. This inspires the group to freeze Star Bem Gyeron to prevent it from regenerating once destroyed, Leito offering a solution when the question of how to gather the remains in time is brought up. On the sixth day, once preparations were made, Zero Beyond forms a barrier so Geed Royal Megamaster can destroy Star Bem Gyeron with its fragments only scattered in a 1 kilometer radius so the Hoshiyama residents can help gather and contain the fragments which the AIB later scatter across the universe. On seventh day, having learned of the Dark Lugiel and Alien Empera Capsules in AIB custody, Kei decides to settle things with Riku thanks to the accumulated data he gained from using Star Bem Gyeron to analyze Geed's powers. This episode's segment for Ultra Capsule Navi features the Capsules of Ultraman Zero (Luna-Miracle Zero) and Arch Belial.
21	"Pega Runs Away from Home"; Transliteration: "Pega, Iede Suru" (Japanese: ペガ、家出する)	Misaki Morie	November 25, 2017
Pega accidentally broke a rare Donshine alarm clock when freaked out by a tremor, which RE.M. assure him would not affect the Nebula House. But Riku overacts, with words being exchanged as an upset Pega leaves the Nebula House to prove he doesn't need Riku. After being chased by a store clerk, Pega ends up in the park and remembers the day he met Riku and they became friends. Meanwhile, after Laiha told her of his spat with Pega, Moa convinces Riku to find his alien friend. By the time Riku finds Pega, he saves the alien from being crushed by a Gubila that developed a Little Star. Matters worsen when Kei appears as Pedanium Zetton and attempts to kill Gubila to snuff out the Little Star. Riku becomes Geed to save Gubila, assuming Royal Megamaster form to counter the stronger opponent. But Kei uses his strategy to counter Geed until Gubila paralyzes Pedanium Zetton so Geed can defeat him with his Vertical Spark attack. Gubila then gives Geed its Little Star power in the form of the Zoffy Capsule. Soon after, Gubila returns to the sea while Riku and Pega renew their friendship with the latter repairing the Donshine clock. Meanwhile, deeming that the Monster Capsules in his arsenal are not enough, Kei resolves to take the Dark Lugiel and Alien Empira Capsules from the AIB. This episode's segment for Ultra Capsule Navi features the Capsules of Ultraman Ace and Gubila.
22	"Repossession"; Transliteration: "Dakkan" (Japanese: 奪還)	Uiko Miura	December 2, 2017
The AIB requests Riku's help when they receive a message from Kei that he will kills his hostage Arie unless Riku to hands the Alien Empera and Dark Lugiel Capsules. While Moa is concerned it might be a trap for Riku, Zenna assures her as they abduct Leito for Zero's assistance. Once the group arrive to the warehouse, Kei forces them to disarm before demanding Riku to hand him the Monster Capsules. Explaining that their story is drawing to an end and that only one of them can deem the outcome as heirs to Belial's legacy, Kei is intercepted by Zero as he saves Arie with Moa taking her safety awhile Zenna and Laiha hold the Sturm off. But Kei retaliates by using the King Joe and Galactron Capsules to transform into King Galactron as he causes Moa to crash, overpowering Geed Royal Megamaster and Zero Beyond before they manage to defeat him. It is then that Arie arrives to Kei's side and hands him Monster Capsules, revealed to have fallen in love with him and wanting to be my side to see the end of the world. But Kei kills her, thanking her for her serving her purpose and takes his leave while reminding Riku that only one of them will finish their story. As Moa is being consoled while Leito points out the fact that Kei did not use the Monster Capsules at that time, Riku realizes what he must do as he hears Kei's voice in his head. This episode's segment for Ultra Capsule Navi features the Capsules of Zoffy and Alien Empera.
23	"The Sturm's Light"; Transliteration: "Sutorumu no Hikari" (Japanese: ストルムの光)	Uiko Miura	December 9, 2017
Leaving a letter behind for Laiha to find, Riku left to face Kei on his own at a gusuku somewhere in Okinawa while seeing visions of the villain revealing his past. Once the others deduce their whereabouts, Zenna leaves for Okinawa with Laiha while leaving Moa behind to support Zero as she and others learn more about Kei's Sturm Organ increases his power whenever he absorbs an enemy's attack and polarizes it for his use. Moa contacts Laiha, telling her to check the Nakagusuku Castle while revealing that Kei selected the location as it will be where the light of his destroyed home world will be visible in Earth's sky. Once Riku confronts Kei, who takes in Planet Sturm's light, they transform with Geed being overpowered by a stronger Pedanium Zetton. Geed assumes Royal Megamaster form, with Kei responding by using the Dark Lugiel and Alien Empira Capsules to increase Pedanium Zetton's size before being defeated by Geed using everything he had in one attack. Laiha and Zenna find Riku as he watches Kei struggling to get up, the youth telling Kei to give up. But things go south when Arie arrives, revealing to be possessed by Belial prior to her meeting with Kei. Belial proceeds to claim the Monster Caspules while ripping out Kei's Sturm Organ and assimilating it into his body, abandoning both Arie's body and Kei to his eventual death without his organ to sustain him. Despite the treachery, Kei is more raptured of being been a key figure in Belial's plan as he escapes the AIB. As Laiha tells Riku not to do things by himself anymore, Belial uses the Dark Lugiel and Alien Empira Capsules to transform into Ultraman Belial Atrocious. This episode's segment for Ultra Capsule Navi features the Capsules of Ultraman Belial (with updated information) and Dark Lugiel.
24	"The Fragments of Hope"; Transliteration: "Kibō no Kakera" (Japanese: キボウノカケラ)	Hirotaka Adachi	December 16, 2017
After transforming into his Atrocious form, Belial makes his presence known to Earth and declares his intent to wipe out the planet as a display of his new power once fully charged. Tremors soon begin to occur as Riku's group learns from the AIB that Belial is using the Sturm Organ to absorb the scattered essence of Ultraman King and convert it into his power, which can badly affect the universe if left unchecked. Laiha remembers Tri's study of neutralizing the Carellen Particles, with a plan established for Zero to distract Belial long enough for the gas to be applied to the evil Ultraman's Color Timer. As it would take ten hours for the anti-Carellen gas to be developed, Zenna setting a plan to use Zegun to help Geed trap the weakened Belial in an inescapable void while Laiha intends to find Kei, Leito uses that time to spend time with his family for Mayu's birthday. When preparations have been completed, the Nebula House assuming its true form as the spaceship Neo Britannia to commence the plan, Leito is shocked to find Rumina knew he is helping the Ultramen as she and Mayu wish him the best of luck. Sensing Zero after he transformed, Belial returns to Earth and faces his mortal enemy in what he intends to be their final battle with an unexpected advantage in a dying Kei holding Rumina and Mayu hostage. Though Laiha manages to drive Kei from Leito's family before facing him, the plan falls apart when Belial and grounds the Neo Britannia, forcing Riku to transform into Geed prematurely to save a weakened Zero while vowing to settle things with his father.
25	"The Symbol of Geed"; Transliteration: "Jīdo no Akashi" (Japanese: GEEDの証)	Hirotaka Adachi	December 23, 2017
As Laiha battles Kei before he escapes, Geed assumes Royal Megamaster form to combat Belial before being greatly overpowered. Zero manages to prevent Belial from absorbing any more of King's power, but he is mortally wounded in the process as Father of Ultra appears and restrains Belial within a barrier to give the group time to recuperate. The next day, with Leito still in the hospital, Father's barrier shatters as Geed joins the fray once more while Laiha settles things with Kei before giving him closure as his life comes to an end. Zenna enters the fully restored Zegun to commence the plan to trap Belial in the void. But Belial easily destroys Zegun with Geed forced to fight his father alone, his refusal to give up in the face of hopelessness reaching the Ultramen across the universe as King's spirit creates constructs of Geed's other forms to fight with him. The five Geeds manage to fight Belial back to his usual form with Geed sacrificing himself to drag Belial into the void. As Geed battles Belial, he sees the evil Ultraman's memories and makes a final attempt to reason with him before destroying him and then returning to his world as the portal collapses. With the universe restored, King regains his physical form as he and Father take their leave. Sometime after, as Zero leaves Leito's body to rejoin the Ultramen, Riku and the others are resuming their usual daily lives with Geed now recognized as a true hero.
