= List of Kaiji volumes =

Kaiji is a Japanese manga series written and illustrated by Nobuyuki Fukumoto. It has been serialized in Kodansha's seinen manga magazine Weekly Young Magazine since February 19, 1996. The story centers on Kaiji Itō, a consummate gambler, and his misadventures around gambling. The series has currently been divided into six parts; the current part, Tobaku Datenroku Kaiji: 24 Oku Dasshutsu-hen, started in 2017.

In August 2018, it was announced at Otakon that the then brand new North American manga publishing company Denpa licensed the first part of the manga Gambling Apocalypse: Kaiji. It is being released in a six-volume omnibus edition with 500+ pages in each one, and the first volume was published on November 12, 2019.

== Part 1: Gambling Apocalypse: Kaiji ==
No.	Release date	ISBN
01	September 6, 1996	978-4-06-336608-2
02	October 4, 1996	978-4-06-336623-5
03	December 6, 1996	978-4-06-336640-2
04	April 4, 1997	978-4-06-336659-4
05	July 4, 1997	978-4-06-336674-7
06	December 5, 1997	978-4-06-336709-6
07	March 6, 1998	978-4-06-336726-3
08	July 6, 1998	978-4-06-336745-4
09	October 6, 1998	978-4-06-336762-1
10	January 7, 1999	978-4-06-336776-8
11	June 4, 1999	978-4-06-336804-8
12	September 6, 1999	978-4-06-336825-3
13	October 6, 1999	978-4-06-336832-1

== Part 2: Tobaku Hakairoku Kaiji ==
No.	Release date	ISBN
01 (14)	November 6, 2000	978-4-06-336910-6
02 (15)	March 6, 2001	978-4-06-336936-6
03 (16)	July 6, 2001	978-4-06-336960-1
04 (17)	November 6, 2001	978-4-06-336994-6
05 (18)	March 6, 2002	978-4-06-361025-3
06 (19)	June 6, 2002	978-4-06-361047-5
07 (20)	October 4, 2002	978-4-06-361076-5
08 (21)	December 26, 2002	978-4-06-361097-0
09 (22)	April 4, 2003	978-4-06-361122-9
10 (23)	September 5, 2003	978-4-06-361160-1
11 (24)	December 25, 2003	978-4-06-361191-5
12 (25)	March 5, 2004	978-4-06-361213-4
13 (26)	April 4, 2004	978-4-06-361222-6

== Part 3: Tobaku Datenroku Kaiji ==
No.	Release date	ISBN
01 (27)	November 5, 2004	978-4-06-361280-6
02 (28)	March 4, 2005	978-4-06-361317-9
03 (29)	June 6, 2005	978-4-06-361346-9
04 (30)	October 6, 2005	978-4-06-361376-6
05 (31)	January 6, 2006	978-4-06-361415-2
06 (32)	April 6, 2006	978-4-06-361437-4
07 (33)	July 6, 2006	978-4-06-361457-2
08 (34)	November 6, 2006	978-4-06-361494-7
09 (35)	February 6, 2007	978-4-06-361524-1
10 (36)	June 6, 2007	978-4-06-361553-1
11 (37)	September 6, 2007	978-4-06-361587-6
12 (38)	December 28, 2007	978-4-06-361631-6
13 (39)	April 4, 2008	978-4-06-361648-4

== Part 4: Tobaku Datenroku Kaiji: Kazuya-hen ==
No.	Release date	ISBN
01 (40)	October 6, 2009	978-4-06-361845-7
02 (41)	February 5, 2010	978-4-06-361870-9
03 (42)	June 4, 2010	978-4-06-361903-4
04 (43)	October 6, 2010	978-4-06-361947-8
05 (44)	February 4, 2011	978-4-06-361996-6
06 (45)	June 6, 2011	978-4-06-382037-9
07 (46)	October 28, 2011	978-4-06-382093-5
08 (47)	March 6, 2012	978-4-06-382145-1
09 (48)	July 6, 2012	978-4-06-382192-5
10 (49)	July 5, 2013	978-4-06-382319-6

== Part 5: Tobaku Datenroku Kaiji: One Poker-hen ==
No.	Release date	ISBN
01 (50)	November 6, 2013	978-4-06-382358-5
02 (51)	December 20, 2013	978-4-06-382390-5
03 (52)	May 2, 2014	978-4-06-382469-8
04 (53)	September 5, 2014	978-4-06-382523-7
05 (54)	December 5, 2014	978-4-06-382540-4
06 (55)	March 6, 2015	978-4-06-382581-7
07 (56)	June 5, 2015	978-4-06-382615-9
08 (57)	September 4, 2015	978-4-06-382676-0
09 (58)	December 4, 2015	978-4-06-382720-0
10 (59)	March 4, 2016	978-4-06-382747-7
11 (60)	June 6, 2016	978-4-06-382803-0
12 (61)	October 6, 2016	978-4-06-382865-8
13 (62)	September 6, 2017	978-4-06-382906-8
14 (63)	September 6, 2017	978-4-06-510149-0
15 (64)	November 6, 2017	978-4-06-510427-9
16 (65)	January 5, 2018	978-4-06-510564-1

== Part 6: Tobaku Datenroku Kaiji: 24 Oku Dasshutsu-hen ==
No.	Release date	ISBN
01 (66)	June 6, 2018	978-4-06-510942-7
02 (67)	June 6, 2018	978-4-06-511840-5
03 (68)	March 6, 2019	978-4-06-514795-5
04 (69)	July 5, 2019	978-4-06-516350-4
05 (70)	November 6, 2019	978-4-06-517727-3
06 (71)	December 6, 2019	978-4-06-517852-2
07 (72)	June 5, 2020	978-4-06-519997-8
08 (73)	October 6, 2020	978-4-06-520991-2
09 (74)	November 6, 2020	978-4-06-521333-9
10 (75)	February 5, 2021	978-4-06-522281-2
11 (76)	May 6, 2021	978-4-06-523344-3
12 (77)	July 6, 2021	978-4-06-523987-2
13 (78)	September 6, 2021	978-4-06-524745-7
14 (79)	November 5, 2021	978-4-06-525873-6
15 (80)	January 6, 2022	978-4-06-526487-4
16 (81)	March 4, 2022	978-4-06-527111-7
17 (82)	May 6, 2022	978-4-06-527111-7
18 (83)	July 6, 2022	978-4-06-528476-6
19 (84)	September 6, 2022	978-4-06-529117-7
20 (85)	November 4, 2022	978-4-06-529807-7
21 (86)	January 6, 2023	978-4-06-530381-8
22 (87)	March 6, 2023	978-4-06-531049-6
23 (88)	May 8, 2023	978-4-06-531692-4
24 (89)	July 6, 2023	978-4-06-532252-9
25 (90)	October 5, 2023	978-4-06-533369-3
26 (91)	December 6, 2023	978-4-06-533928-2
