= Panpanya =

Japanese manga artist

panpanya
- Born: Japan
- Occupation: Manga artist
- Writing career
- Notable work: Ashizuri Suizokukan
- Website: SURMICLUSSER

panpanya is a pseudonymous Japanese manga artist. They made their commercial debut with Ashizuri Suizokukan (Ashizuri Aquarium) in 2013 to critical acclaim in Japan. They subsequently published An Invitation from a Crab in 2014, which also received praise.

In a review of an English translation published by Denpa, panpanya has been described as "one of the most beloved and influential doujinshi artists in Japan", with publishing company founder Ed Chavez writing that "he is put on a very high pedestal in Japan" despite the fact that their work "does not sell great numbers".

== Style ==
Panpanya's published manga utilize a characteristic art style drawing upon traits of surrealism. These include elaborately detailed backgrounds as well as simplistic, depersonalized, and "impossible" characters and landscapes. Their more recent works have been described as increasingly grounded in reality.

e-flux Architecture editor Nick Axel has likened panpanya's Graphic novels to the art of Genpei Akasegawa, speaking to a "practice of noticing" and describing their work as featuring "meticulous representations of quotidian urban details".

== Personal life ==
Panpanya chooses to remain almost entirely anonymous, not publicizing their real name, gender, home prefecture, or date of birth. In a 2019 interview, Nicole Coolidge Rousmaniere, curator of The Citi Exhibition: Manga at the British Museum, described panpanya as "this young… well, they don't want to say an age, but they're a newish artist, and their name is Panpanya and they're non-binary and they're very cool."

== Works ==
The majority of panpanya's published works are collections of short stories that have little (if any) relation to each other apart from a shared roster of characters. Their place in time and space are left largely ambiguous, apart for a handful of times where the nameless protagonist, generally seen as panpanya themself, is at school or working a job. Some, however, feature a more extended storyline interweaved with shorter vignettes, such as Guyabano Holiday and their earlier works.

=== Serialized manga ===
1. Ashizuri Aquarium (Ashizuri Suizokukan) (31 August 2013) ISBN 978-4-907259-02-0
  - A collection of illustrated dream diaries.
  - Contents: Ashizuri Aquarium / The Complete Shopping District / Board Game / A New Universe / Innocent World / A Dream I had on April 17th, 2012 / Ashizuri Aquarium / The City of the Dead / Sputnik / Untitled / Creatures of the Machine Age / A Fish For You / Ending Theme.
2. An Invitation from a Crab (Kani ni Sasowarete) (30 April 2014, Hakusensha) ISBN 978-4-592-71068-4
  - Published in English by Denpa on 18 December 2018.
  - Blurb: "If you are ever fortunate enough to see a crab strolling through your neighborhood, please follow its lead. By slowing down to a crab's pace and looking around and about the world, you too may discover life's many mysteries that are hidden in plain sight."
  - Contents: An Invitation from a Crab / Incomprehensible Memories / A Story about Fish / innovation / Hell / Pineapple Ignorance / The Pond that Appeared / Wandering, Wondering / The Case of the Giant Salamander / decoy / Sensation / TAKUAN DREAM / Dream, January 31, 2014 / Worthwhile / A Restless Day / Hot Pot / THE PERFECT SUNDAY / The Heart of a Calculator.
3. Pillow Fish (Makura Sakana) (2 May 2015, Hakusensha) ISBN 978-4-592-71084-4
  - Short stories. No English translation.
4. Animals (Doubutsu-tachi) (5 December 2016, Hakusensha) ISBN 978-4-592-71109-4
  - No English translation.
5. The Second Goldfish (Nihikime no Kingyo) (31 January 2018, Hakusensha) ISBN 978-4-592-71129-2
  - No English translation.
6. Guyabano Holiday (31 January 2019, Hakusensha) ISBN 978-4-592-71146-9
  - Published in English by Denpa on 8th February 2023.
  - Blurb: "A fruit in the Annona genus originally from the Americas that is often eaten in the countries of Southeast Asia, such as the Philippines. Weak to cold temperatures, it is said to be grown in a tiny portion of Japan, but their existence seems to be very niche. The name guyabano comes from Tagalog, while in English it is sometimes known as soursop, and in Japanese it is togeban-reishi. Globally there is limited awareness of the fruit's existence. To improve on that, this book will cover the fruit's origins, its horticulture, and its gastronomy. A collection of such stories are what is known in publishing circles as a Guyabano Holiday.
  - Contents: Building a House / The Mechanism of Homework / The Study Kotatsu / How to Can Goods / How to Forge a Journal / Guyabano Holiday / Guyabano Holiday: Part 2 / Guyabano Holiday: Part 3 / Guyabano Holiday: Sidebar 1 / Guyabano Holiday: Sidebar 2 / Guyabano Holiday: Part 4 / Guyabano Holiday: Sidebar 3 / Guyabano Holiday: Part 5 / Introduction to Comparative Pigeon Studies / Signs of a Coincidence / An Unknown Summer / Permission 2 / At the Aquarium / Symbol / Waiting at the Usual Spot / Sweet Potato Vine Wonderland / Commentary.
7. Omusubi no korogaru machi (31 March 2020, Hakusensha) ISBN 978-4-592-71165-0
  - No English translation.
8. Fish Society (Sakana Shakai) (28 January 2021)
  - English translation by Denpa forthcoming.
9. Model Town (Mokei no machi) (30 September 2022)
  - No English translation.
10. History of the Shopping Street (Shōten-gai no Ayumi) (30 November 2023)
  - No English translation.
