= Yuta Ozawa =

Japanese actor (born 1985)

- 小澤 雄太
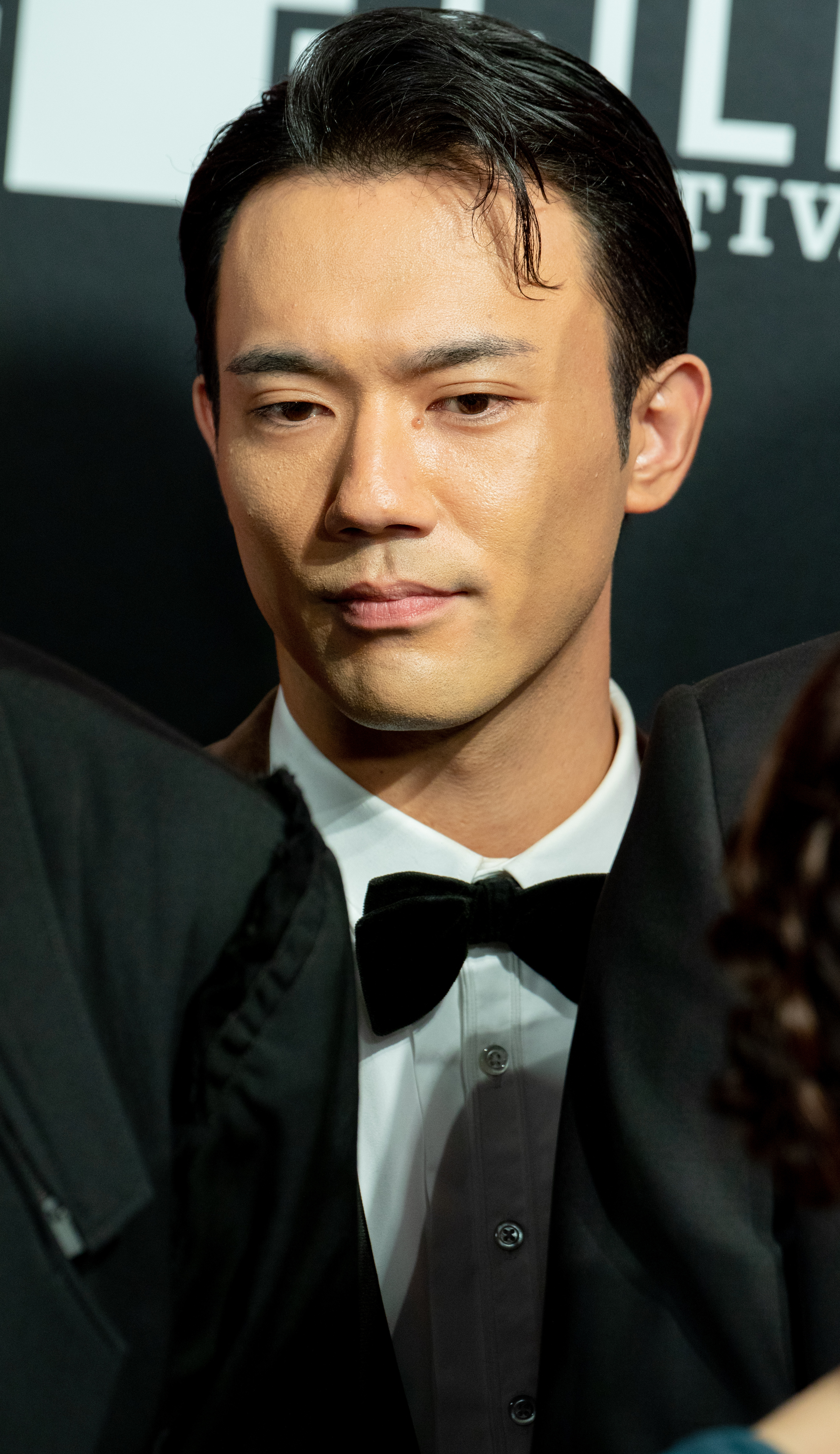
- Ozawa at the 2018 Tokyo International Film Festival
- Born: 8 October 1985 (age 40); Edogawa, Tokyo, Japan
- Occupation: Actor
- Years active: 2009–present
- Agent: LDH Japan

Yuta Ozawa (小澤 雄太, Ozawa Yūta; born 8 October 1985) is a Japanese actor who is a member of the theatre company Gekidan Exile.

Born in Edogawa, Tokyo, he is represented by LDH Japan.

== Biography ==
In 2009, he passed the "First Gekidan Exile Audition," and began his acting career. He has appeared in a number of theatre productions, feature films and television series.

== Appearances ==
=== Stage ===
- Gekidan Exile Hanagumi Festival Performance Yubae 8-gō (Nov 2009) – as Nakajima
- Gekidan Exile Hanagumi 2nd performance Rokuwarutō (Apr 2010) – as Shikichi Kimura
- Gekidan Exile Hanagumi 3rd performance Kill The Black (Jun 2010) – as Ponce/Kunio
- Gekidan Exile Hanagumi×Kazegumi joint performance Rokudenashi Blues (Dec 2010) – as Kotobu Nakada
- '12' –12-Ri no Ikareru Otoko yori– (Feb 2011)
- Konton Club –image4– (Apr 2011)
- Hōnangumi project performance "Fukuru no Nezumi" extra edition Michi (Jul 2011)
- Kohei Tsuka Memorial Performance Shin Bakumatsu Junjō-den (Sep–Oct 2011)
- Sanada Ten Braves –Boku-ra ga Mamoritakatta mono– (Dec 2011)
- Taichi Saotome special performance Goemon –Kokō no Senshi– (Mar–May 2012)
- Hōnangumi×Gekidan Exile Attack No.1 (Aug–Sep 2012)
- Satomi Hakkenden (Nov 2012)
- Bio Hazard Cafe de Chōshoku o (Feb 2013)
- Gekidan Exile performance Sadako -Tanjō Hiwa- (May 2013)
- Gekidan Exile performance Attack No.1 (Aug–Sep 2013) – as Second Lieutenant Tetsuo Otaki
- Psychometer Eiji –Tokei Shikake no Ringo– (Feb–Mar 2014) – Starring; as Eiji Asuma
- Gekidan Exile Attack No.1 spin-off read aloud Mayuge Ichizoku no Inbō (Apr 2014)
- Gekidan Exile performance The Mensetsu (Jul 2014)
- Gekidan Exile performance Soreike Kogekijō!! (Oct 2014)
- Aoyama Mainland presents gmk project first show Shin Bakumatsu Junjō-den (Jan 2015)
- Gekidan Exile performance Tomorrow Never Dies –Yattekonai Ashita wanai– (Feb–Mar 2015)
- WataRoom production performance Otoko ga Naku Riyū, Oshiemasu '4649' (May 2015)
- Hōnangumi Planned Performance Attack No.1 (Aug 2015)
- Vivid Contact -re:born- (Jan 2016)
- Mitsukoshi Theater Presents Reading Stage Aitakute (Sep 2017)
- Hōnangumi Planned Performance Iga no Hanayome Sono Ni Onihasoto-hen (Jan–Feb 2018)
- Akatsuki no Tei –Jinshin no Ran-hen– (Jun–Jul 2018) – Starring

=== TV dramas ===
- Premium Saturday Yume no Mitsuke-kata Oshietaru! 2 (13 Mar 2010, CX)
- Rokudenashi Blues (Jul–Sep 2011, NTV) – as Katsuji Yamashita
- Kekkon Dōsōkai –Seaside Love– (Jul–Aug 2012, Fuji TV Two) – as Kota Shigeki
- Saturday Night at the Mysteries Yame Ken no Onna 3 (21 Jul 2012, ABC) – as Detective
- Sugarless (Oct–Dec 2012, NTV) – as Nobumitsu Ogaki/Ogre
- Suiyō Mystery 9 Tokumei Obasan Kenji! Ayano Hanamura no Jiken File (26 Dec 2012, TX) – as Koji Kanai
- GTO Kanketsu-hen –Saraba Onizuka! Sotsugyō Special (2 Apr 2013, CX)
- Hanasaku ashita (Jan–Feb 2014, NHK BS Premium) – as Sho Komiyama
- Temmis no Kyūkei Episode 2 (17 May 2015, Wowow)
- High & Low: The Story of S.W.O.R.D. (Oct–Dec 2015, NTV) – as Washi Kato
  - High & Low: Season2 (Apr–Jun 2016)
- Ultraman Geed (Jul–Dec 2017, TX) – as Leito Igaguri
- Koshiji Fubuki Monogatari (Jan 2018 –, TV Asahi) – as Shuji Sakuma

=== Webcast dramas ===
- Onna Rule Shiawase ni naru tame no 50 no Okite Episode 12 (23 Apr 2013, NotTV)
- Renai wa Hitsuzendearu –Drama de Wakaru! Shin Kankaku Renai Hōsoku– Episode 8 (12 Feb 2014, dVideo-BeeTV)

=== Films ===
- Gewalt (Nov 2013) – Starring; as Gurio Anno
- Road To High & Low (May 2016) – as Washi Kato
  - High & Low: The Movie (Jul 2016)
  - High & Low: The Movie 2/End Of Sky (Aug 2017)
- Ultraman Geed the Movie (Mar 2018) – as Leito Igaguri
- The Dignified Death of Shizuo Yamanaka (2020)
- Shikkokuten (2022)

=== Music videos ===
- Sandaime J Soul Brothers "Fighters" (2011)

=== Radio dramas ===
- Saturday Drama House "Binanshi Gekijō" Story Dai Jūku Dan Story Dancing in the Nursery (Oct 2016, JNF) – as Suzue Haraguchi, Jin Ebisawa
