= Under Ninja =

Japanese manga series

- Cover of the first volume

アンダーニンジャ (Andā Ninja)
- Genre: Action, comedy
- Manga
- Written by: Kengo Hanazawa
- Published by: Kodansha
- English publisher: NA: Denpa
- Imprint: Young Magazine KC
- Magazine: Weekly Young Magazine
- Original run: July 23, 2018 – present
- Volumes: 18
- Anime television series
- Directed by: Satoshi Kuwabara
- Written by: Keiichirō Ōchi
- Music by: Shōta Kowashi
- Studio: Tezuka Productions
- Licensed by: Crunchyroll
- Original network: TBS, BS11
- Original run: October 6, 2023 – December 22, 2023
- Episodes: 12
- Live-action film
- Directed by: Yūichi Fukuda
- Written by: Yūichi Fukuda
- Released: January 24, 2025
- icon

Under Ninja (Japanese: アンダーニンジャ, Hepburn: Andā Ninja) is a Japanese manga series written and illustrated by Kengo Hanazawa. It has been serialized in Kodansha's Weekly Young Magazine since July 2018. An anime television series adaptation by Tezuka Productions aired from October to December 2023. A live-action film adaptation premiered in Japanese theaters in January 2025.

== Plot ==
The ninja organization in Japan, which once flourished, was dismantled by the GHQ after the Pacific War and disappeared. However, the ninja still exist in secret, and it is said that there are 200,000 of them living in Japan today, hiding and working in the dark in the public and private sectors and in all kinds of organizations. While some of the elite ninja work behind the scenes in national level conflicts, the ninja at the end of the line are often unable to find work. One of them, Kuro Kumogakure, who is living the life of a NEET, receives a serious "ninja assignment", an order from his superiors to infiltrate a high school with the latest equipment.

== Characters ==
Kurō Kumogakure (雲隠 九郎, Kumogakure Kurō)
Voiced by: Taito Ban
Portrayed by: Kento Yamazaki
Katō (加藤)
Voiced by: Tarusuke Shingaki
Portrayed by: Shotaro Mamiya
Miracle Hibi (日比 奇跡, Hibi Mirakuru)
Voiced by: Tasuku Hatanaka
Suzuki (鈴木)
Voiced by: Atsumi Tanezaki
Portrayed by: Mai Shiraishi
Shion Hachiya (蜂谷 紫音, Hachiya Shion)
Voiced by: Daiki Yamashita
Portrayed by: Ryubi Miyase
Kawado (川戸)
Voiced by: Chika Anzai
Portrayed by: Haruka Kinami
Ōno (大野)
Voiced by: Chō
Portrayed by: Tsuyoshi Muro
Eita (瑛太)
Voiced by: Shūichi Uchida
Portrayed by: Ryо̄tarо̄ Sakaguchi
Noguchi (野口)
Voiced by: Sora Tokui
Portrayed by: Minami Hamabe
Ozu (小津)
Voiced by: Kōichi Sōma
Saruta (猿田)
Portrayed by: Amane Okayama
Mitsuki Yamada (山田美月, Yamada Mitsuki)
Portrayed by: Chihiro Yamamoto
Principal (主事, Shuji)
Portrayed by: Mitsuru Hirata
Homeroom Teacher (担任, Tan'nin)
Portrayed by: Shinobu Hasegawa
Akikazu Yoshida (吉田昭和, Yoshida Akikazu)
Portrayed by: Jiro Sato

== Media ==
=== Manga ===
Under Ninja, written and illustrated by Kengo Hanazawa, started in Kodansha's seinen manga magazine Weekly Young Magazine on July 23, 2018. Kodansha has collected its chapters into individual tankōbon volumes. The first volume was released on February 6, 2019. As of August 6, 2026, 18 volumes have been released.

In North America, Denpa announced the English language release of the manga in July 2020.

==== Volumes ====
| No. | Original release date | Original ISBN | English release date | English ISBN |
|---|---|---|---|---|
| 1 | February 6, 2019 | 978-4-06-514569-2 | January 10, 2023 | 978-1-63-442992-4 |
| 2 | August 6, 2019 | 978-4-06-516733-5 | August 29, 2023 | 978-1-63-442927-6 |
| 3 | February 6, 2020 | 978-4-06-518477-6 | November 21, 2023 | 978-1-63-442838-5 |
| 4 | September 4, 2020 | 978-4-06-520682-9 | October 29, 2024 | 978-1-63-442863-7 |
| 5 | March 5, 2021 | 978-4-06-522595-0 | January 7, 2025 | 978-1-63-442880-4 |
| 6 | September 6, 2021 | 978-4-06-524754-9 | March 25, 2025 | 978-1-63-442885-9 |
| 7 | March 4, 2022 | 978-4-06-527060-8 | January 26, 2027 | 978-1-63-442887-3 |
| 8 | August 5, 2022 | 978-4-06-528810-8 | | |
| 9 | January 6, 2023 | 978-4-06-530398-6 | — | — |
| 10 | May 8, 2023 | 978-4-06-531894-2 | — | — |
| 11 | September 6, 2023 | 978-4-06-533003-6 | — | — |
| 12 | February 6, 2024 | 978-4-06-534600-6 | — | — |
| 13 | July 5, 2024 | 978-4-06-536272-3 | — | — |
| 14 | December 6, 2024 | 978-4-06-537900-4 | — | — |
| 15 | April 4, 2025 | 978-4-06-539224-9 | — | — |
| 16 | October 6, 2025 | 978-4-06-541134-6 | — | — |
| 17 | March 6, 2026 | 978-4-06-542876-4 | — | — |
| 18 | August 6, 2026 | 978-4-06-544482-5 | — | — |

=== Anime ===
On September 6, 2021, it was announced that the series would receive an anime television series adaptation. It is produced by Tezuka Productions and directed by Satoshi Kuwabara, with scripts supervised by Keiichirō Ōchi, character designs by Nobuteru Yūki, and music composed by Shōta Kowashi. The series aired from October 6 to December 22, 2023, on TBS and BS11. (Note: TBS lists the series premiere on October 5 at 25:43, which is effectively October 6 at 1:43 a.m. JST.) The opening theme song is "Hyper" by Kroi. Crunchyroll streamed the series outside of Asia.

==== Episodes ====
| No. | Title | Directed by (Note: Information is taken from the ending credits of each episode.) | Written by | Storyboarded by | Original release date |
|---|---|---|---|---|---|
| 1 | "Throw a Rock, Hit a Ninja"; Transliteration: "Ishi o Nagereba Ninja ni Ataru" (Japanese: 石を投げれば忍者に当たる) | Kimiharu Mutou | Keiichirō Ōchi | Satoshi Kuwabara | October 6, 2023 |
Two small groups of ninjas from neighboring school buildings stare each other down, threatening to take action. The scene flashes back to two months earlier, where an unemployed high-school dropout named Kurō Kumogakure is given a modern ninja hoodie along with orders to infiltrate a local high school. After helping out his neighbor Kawado, and giving her some beer that he stole from another neighbor named Ōno, she agrees to pose as his mother to enroll him in the school. Meanwhile, a Russian man loudly tries to meet a ninja on his own.
| 2 | "I Want to Be a Ninja"; Transliteration: "Watashi wa Ninja ni Naritai" (Japanese: 私は忍者になりたい) | Taiji Kanawashi | Keiichirō Ōchi | Satoshi Kuwabara | October 13, 2023 |
In the present, Kuro continues his duel with a high school girl from an opposing school. Back in July, the Russian man finds a torii scrawled on a utility pole with a message nearby warning people not to piss in public or their dicks will be cut off. The Russian's handler tells him to find and infiltrate a ninja clan in order to keep his baby daughter alive. Thinking the message is a ninja code, he begins to cut off the dicks of anyone pissing outside nearby. However, he starts to build a reputation as the Nerima Slasher, especially after a failed attempt to attack a gross man who turns out to have real ninja skills and a fake dick. Kuro is then given the assignment by Kato to find this Nerima Slasher and take him out. As a young girl manages to find the Russian hiding under a shrine, Kato and Sasama talk about the current state of ninja affairs.
| 3 | "Boobs: So Close, Yet So Far"; Transliteration: "Oppai wa Chikakute Tōi Sonzai" (Japanese: オッパイは近くて遠い存在) | Mie Matsushima | Keiichirō Ōchi | Satoshi Kuwabara | October 20, 2023 |
In the present, Kuro injures his opponent's arm by slamming it into a railing, while one of his teammates attacks her gyaru allies. Back in July, Kuro set a trap for Kawado's bra thief, only to find it was a high school boy. After covering for him, Kuro deputizes the boy to help him find the Nerima Slasher, and the boy later hands the task to a little girl at his apartment block in exchange for letting her fly his drone. Some time later, the girl finds the Russian man and takes him to her apartment, then shows him to the boy to play with the drone. The boy then tells Kuro, but the message goes out to multiple ninja in the area, who all converge on the same apartment block to take out the Russian man.
| 4 | "Do You Know What the Ninja Code Says?"; Transliteration: "Shinobi no Okite wa Wakatteiruna?" (Japanese: 忍びの掟は分かっているな？) | Satoru Yamashita | Keiichirō Ōchi | Wataru Chihara | October 27, 2023 |
In the present, the ninja successfully neutralize their rivals while Shion tries to make up with their leader in the nurse's office. Back in July, the Russian man manages to fight off two ninja opponents and steal the kei car of an abusive father, sparing him at the last minute when the little girl at the apartments cries out. However, the Russian man is knocked out by an invisible Kuro, and then escorted to a meeting with more senior ninja. Sasama takes off his suit and reveals his true form to be that of a skinnier woman. The ninja send a couple assassins to rescue the Russian's daughter and kill his handler, informing him that they have recruited him into their foreign affairs division.
| 5 | "Kumogakure Is Within the Top 10 Common Family Names in Japan (Lying)"; Transliteration: "Kumogakure wa Nippon de Oi Myōji Rankingu Ichi Zero iinai（Uso）" (Japanese: 雲隠は日本で多い名字ランキング10位以内（嘘）) | Shintarō Matsui | Keiichirō Ōchi | Igumikyia, Satoshi Kuwabara | November 3, 2023 |
Kuro takes the entrance exam to enter the high school for his mission, with Shion's sending him coded test answers using colored grains of rice stuck between the floorboards. However, his classmate Noguchi, who is there to take a make-up exam herself, notices the rice and alerts the teacher, forcing Kuro to take drastic measures to pass the test before his plan is ruined. Afterwards, Kuro invites Noguchi to his home to meet his "mother" Kawado, where they watch a bloody show from the Ninja Broadcast Company. The next day, Kuro heads to school with Eita and Noguchi. After a strange encounter with the school Director, Kuro helps Eita deal with some bullies.
| 6 | "The Lid on This Hellish Cauldron Has Come Off"; Transliteration: "Jigoku no Kama no Futa ga Ima Hiraitayo" (Japanese: 地獄の釜の蓋がいま開いたよ) | 蟹久保朱眞 | Keiichirō Ōchi | Satoshi Kuwabara | November 10, 2023 |
| 7 | "Meow Meow, Meow Meow, Meow Meow Meow Meow Meow?"; Transliteration: "Onyanya, nyannya, nyanyanyanyannya?" (Japanese: オニャニャ、ニャンニャ、ニャニャニャニャンニャ？) | Yuri Uema | Keiichirō Ōchi | Yuri Uema | November 17, 2023 |
| 8 | "Every Last Ninja on the Surface Will Be Annihilated"; Transliteration: "Chijō no Shinobi domo wa, Subete Horobosu" (Japanese: 地上の忍びどもは、すべて滅ぼす) | Kimiharu Mutou | Keiichirō Ōchi | Arisa Konishi, Satoshi Kuwabara | November 24, 2023 |
| 9 | "I'm Gonna Go Down in Shinobi History"; Transliteration: "Ore wa Shinobi no Rekishi ni Nokoruze" (Japanese: 俺は忍びの歴史に残るぜ) | Satoru Yamashita | Keiichirō Ōchi | Wataru Chihara, Satoshi Kuwabara | December 1, 2023 |
| 10 | "A Maiden's Chest Is a Precious Thing"; Transliteration: "Otome no Mune wa Totemo Taisetsuna Mononano" (Japanese: 乙女の胸はとても大切なものなの) | Fumio Maezono | Keiichirō Ōchi | Igumikiya, Satoshi Kuwabara | December 8, 2023 |
| 11 | "Kuro Finally Took Up a Sword"; Transliteration: "Tsuini, Kurō ga Katana o Nigitta" (Japanese: ついに、九郎が刀を握った) | Mie Matsushima | Keiichirō Ōchi | Igumikiya, Satoshi Kuwabara | December 15, 2023 |
| 12 | "Business as Usual, Wrapped Up Tidy"; Transliteration: "Itsumo Tōri Kushukushu Tone" (Japanese: いつも通りクシュクシュとね) | Taiji Kanawashi | Keiichirō Ōchi | Satoshi Kuwabara | December 22, 2023 |

=== Live-action film ===
In March 2024, it was announced that the series would receive a live-action film adaptation. The film adaptation is written and directed by Yūichi Fukuda, and stars Kento Yamazaki and Minami Hamabe as Kurō Kumogakure and Ayaka Noguchi respectively. The film premiered in Japanese theaters on January 24, 2025. The film's theme song is "Doppelgänger", performed by Creepy Nuts.

The film was scheduled to premiere in Los Angeles on January 8, 2025; however, it was cancelled due to the wildfire state of emergency.

== Reception ==
The series was nominated for the 49th Kodansha Manga Award in the general category in 2025.
