= Renjoh Desperado =

Japanese manga series

- First tankōbon volume cover

恋情デスペラード (Renjō Desuperādo)
- Genre: Action, romantic comedy
- Manga
- Written by: Ahndongshik
- Published by: Shogakukan
- English publisher: NA: Denpa
- Magazine: Monthly Shōnen Sunday
- Original run: May 12, 2015 – April 12, 2018
- Volumes: 6
- icon

Renjoh Desperado (Japanese: 恋情デスペラード, Hepburn: Renjō Desuperādo; lit. 'Desperado in Love') is a Japanese manga series written and illustrated by Ahndongshik. It was serialized in Shogakukan's Monthly Shōnen Sunday from May 2015 to April 2018, with its chapters collected in six tankōbon volumes.

== Plot ==
Set in an alternate version of Japan with heavy Western influences, Renjoh Desperado is the story of a wandering swordswoman named Monko, who drifts from town to town looking for her ideal husband. Over the course of her journey, she often ends up rescuing someone from their predicament, only to find out the man she's pursuing isn't as faithful or noble as they first appear. Even so, Monko continues her search for her perfect man, while various figures from her past seek to capture or kill her, including the Shogun.

== Publication ==
Written and illustrated by Ahndongshik, Renjoh Desperado was serialized in Shogakukan's Monthly Shōnen Sunday from May 12, 2015, to April 12, 2018. Shogakukan collected its chapters in six tankōbon volumes, released from November 12, 2015, to June 12, 2018.

In North America, Denpa announced in July 2021 that they had licensed the manga. The first volume is set to be released on July 14, 2026.

=== Volumes ===
No.	Original release date	Original ISBN	English release date	English ISBN
1	November 12, 2015	978-4-09-126617-0	July 14, 2026	978-1-63442-821-7
2	June 10, 2016	978-4-09-127250-8	November 24, 2026	978-1-63442-823-1
3	November 11, 2016	978-4-09-127455-7	March 23, 2027	978-1-63442-891-0
4	May 12, 2016	978-4-09-127620-9	—	—
5	December 12, 2017	978-4-09-128063-3	—	—
6	June 12, 2018	978-4-09-128307-8	—	—
