= I Am a Hero =

Japanese manga series

- First tankōbon volume cover, featuring Hideo Suzuki

アイアムアヒーロー (Ai Amu a Hīrō)
- Genre: Action; Horror; Psychological thriller
- Manga
- Written by: Kengo Hanazawa
- Published by: Shogakukan
- English publisher: NA: Dark Horse Comics
- Magazine: Weekly Big Comic Spirits
- Original run: April 27, 2009 – February 27, 2017
- Volumes: 22
- Live-action film
- Directed by: Shinsuke Sato
- Written by: Akiko Nogi
- Music by: Nima Fakhrara
- Studio: Toho
- Licensed by: NA: Funimation
- Released: October 13, 2015
- Runtime: 126 minutes
- icon

I Am a Hero (Japanese: アイアムアヒーロー, Hepburn: Ai Amu A Hīrō) is a Japanese manga series written and illustrated by Kengo Hanazawa. It was serialized in Shogakukan's seinen manga magazine Weekly Big Comic Spirits from April 2009 to February 2017, with its chapters collected in 22 tankōbon volumes. In North America the manga has been licensed for English language release by Dark Horse Comics.

A live-action film adaptation premiered at the Sitges Film Festival in October 2015, before being released commercially in April 2016. There are three spin-off manga, set in the same universe, titled I Am a Hero in Osaka, I Am a Hero in Ibaraki, and I Am a Hero in Nagasaki, and an anthology series by various manga artists, I Am a Hero Official Anthology: 8 Tales of the ZQN.

By November 2021, the manga had over 8.3 million copies in circulation. In 2013, I Am a Hero won the 58th Shogakukan Manga Award in the general category.

== Plot ==
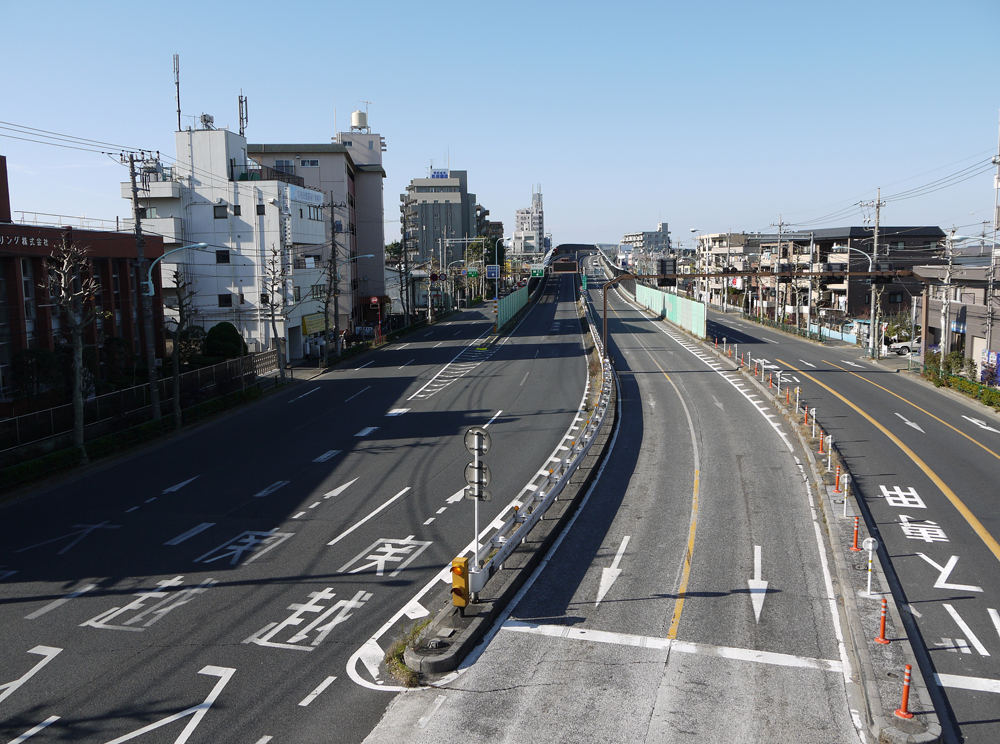
The area of Miharadai in Nerima, Tokyo (pictured in 2010), which is set as Hideo Suzuki's residence in I am a Hero

=== I Am a Hero ===
The story begins with Hideo Suzuki, a 35-year-old manga artist assistant, whose life seems to be stuck around his exhausting but low-paying job, unfulfilled dreams, strange hallucinations and unsatisfying relationships. He sees himself as a supporting character in his own life, and has low self-esteem, resulting in frustration.

One day, the world as Hideo knows it is shattered by the presence of a disease (nicknamed ZQN) that turns people into homicidal zombie-like mutants whose first instinct is to attack and devour the nearest human. Armed with only his sporting shotgun, he runs for his life, meeting strangers along the way. For a while, he and his companions struggle to stay alive, while questioning their moral choices. In the end, only three of them remain and drive all the way to the top of Mt. Fuji to be saved.

=== I Am a Hero in Osaka ===
I Am a Hero in Osaka is set at the beginning of the ZQN outbreak in Osaka. This manga is centered around a part-time manager named Tatsuo with a love for motorcycles and his gasoline-fueled journey to rescue his girlfriend Kozue, stranded on an airplane at Kansai International Airport, as well as Kozue's fight for survival in an increasingly hostile environment. Against sinking odds, the couple do their utmost to reunite with the other.

=== I Am a Hero in Ibaraki ===
I Am a Hero in Ibaraki is set at the beginning of the ZQN outbreak in Ibaraki. The focus of this story is about an isolated high-school student and his dog struggling to survive, not only against the ZQN, but also that of his infected family and childhood friends.

=== I Am a Hero in Nagasaki ===
I Am a Hero in Nagasaki is set at the beginning of the ZQN outbreak in Nagasaki. The manga consists of the story of Yamada, a high-school dropout turned photographer who suffers from vivid hallucinations brought upon by a form of Anthropophobia and Nirei Aya, a Kyūdō national champion and Yamada's former classmate. The story documents their journey to Hashima Island, a perceived place of safety. However, their journey will not only be threatened by simply the ZQN, but also from their fellow humans.

== Characters ==
- Hideo Suzuki: A down-on-his-luck manga artist struggling to publish his own work while maintaining both a day job as another artist's assistant and a strained relationship with his girlfriend. Hideo is slightly paranoid and mentally disturbed, often having conversations with an imaginary figure named Yajima, hallucinating the presence of faces around him, and fantasizing about how conversations with his co-workers and girlfriend should proceed. Though he was bitten on the hand by his girlfriend, the bite did not break the skin and draw blood, narrowly avoiding infection. He seems to have gained the mysterious ability to manipulate the movements of the infected like a puppeteer. After Hiromi leaves, Hideo travels into the city and gets involved in a four-way standoff between himself, the Kurusu Cult, a group of survivors, and the giant creature that Hiromi joined with.
- Hayakari Hiromi: A teenage girl who is empathetic towards the undead. Later, she is infected but still retains most of her personality. Post infection, she loses all the superficial symptoms of the infected (protruding black veins, bloodshot eyes). She eventually has sex with Hideo before allowing the infection to take her and joins the infected hivemind, allowing herself to be consumed by a massive building sized creature, whereupon her more base desires take control and she aids the creature in its attempt to murder Hideo, since he refuses to willingly join the infected. At the last second before devouring him, however, Hiromi's original self fights its way back to the surface and she convinces the creature to let Hideo live, under the pretense of allowing him to suffer more. The epilogue chapter features Hideo confronting the creature one last time and, after several hours of shooting it non-stop, it dies and expels a seemingly-human infant that is implied to be Hideo and Hiromi's child.
- Yabu Oda: A former nurse who was reduced to the role of a sex slave for the group staying at the Gotemba Premium Outlets. She escapes with Hideo and Hiromi, and she understands the significance of Hiromi's condition in potentially understanding and curing the disease. She and Hideo have sex, whereupon she discovers that she is pregnant with the child of one of the men from the outlet. She was subsequently infected by an infant and forced Hiromi to kill her and the child by crushing them in a nearby garbage truck. However, it is revealed after Hiromi joins the infected that she was subconsciously glad that she was allowed to kill Oda, since she was jealous over her and Hideo having sex.
- Kurusu: The main human antagonist. The original Kurusu was a young adult who gained superhuman strength, regeneration, and speed following his infection by his mother, whom he beat to death in an online video to display his powers and how to kill the infected. He rallies disenfranchised youths via a message board to "create a new world". He was assumed to have been killed in a three-way fight with a fellow immune person known as the "Naked Emperor" and a member of his cult named Takeshi, who had gained powers similar to his own and takes over the 'Kurusu' title. He later appears to Hideo after Hideo is partially swallowed by a zombie. The new Kurusu reappears with his cult in Tokyo trying to overthrow a surviving group.
- Kurusu's cult: Disenfranchised youths who communicate on message boards and worship Kurusu. They mostly stay at home until are recruited by Kurusu himself and survived the outbreak by virtue of being shut-ins.
- Other than the major characters, two characters have been used to display the ZQN epidemic in other parts of the world as they and the people around them fall to the infection. Kazu, Hideo's colleague, experiences the outbreak in Taipei and is infected together with his girlfriend. Jan, a Belgian, went back to Brussels to find his son, where he suddenly lost his memory inexplicably. After travelling around, seeing several zombies and a mutated one, he ends up in the Notre-Dame-de-Lorette, and his fate is left unknown when the church is presumably destroyed by airstrikes as he begins to show signs of infection. Another sidestory follows an immune little girl in Italy who is trapped in a belltower with a group of zombies, only to be rescued by another immune man who eats the flesh of the infected, and who takes it upon himself to protect and raise the little girl.

== Media ==
=== Manga ===
I Am a Hero, written and illustrated by Kengo Hanazawa, was serialized in Shōgakukan's seinen manga magazine Weekly Big Comic Spirits from April 27, 2009, to February 27, 2017. Shogakukan collected its chapters in twenty-two tankōbon volumes, released from August 28, 2009, to March 30, 2017.

In North America, Dark Horse Comics announced in May 2015 the license to the manga for English language release, with plans for a two-in-one omnibus format release starting in 2016. Eleven volumes were released from April 13, 2016, to October 23, 2019.

==== Volumes ====
No.	Original release date	Original ISBN	English release date	English ISBN
01	August 28, 2009	978-4-09-182580-3	April 13, 2016	978-1-61655-920-5
One day, after returning from work late in the evening, Hideo witnesses a car crash into a nearby pedestrian, killing the victim instantly. However, despite severe injuries, the victim stands up and walks away. Hideo questions whether this is another one of his hallucinations, but strange events begin happening around him which he blames on his stress and over-time work. The next morning Hideo goes to his girlfriend Tetsuko's apartment (after having a falling out earlier) to apologize. When peering through the mail slot, he finds that she has transformed into a monstrous, zombie-like creature, and she lunges at him.
02	December 26, 2009	978-4-09-182779-1	April 13, 2016	978-1-61655-920-5
After a brief struggle with Tetsuko in which he is bitten on the hand (which didn't break the skin), Hideo manages to watch news about an outbreak where people start to bite each other. After some contemplation, Hideo performs a mercy killing on the zombified Tetsuko, then sets out to his manga studio. Along the way, he witnesses many scenes of zombies attacking people. As he reaches the studio, Hideo sees Mitani clubbing one of their colleagues to death and they work together to kill another zombie colleague. Upon learning that there are more zombies in their district, and that their numbers are rapidly increasing, Hideo follows Mitani out of Shakuji towards Nerima Train Station to escape Tokyo and head for Hanno. Mitani is overwhelmed by zombies and then decapitated by the landing gear of a crashing airplane. Narrowly escaping zombies, Hideo manages to board a train before it leaves.
03	May 28, 2010	978-4-09-183157-6	October 12, 2016	978-1-5067-0019-9
A zombie infects a passenger, and soon almost all the passengers in the car are infected. After the train screeches to a halt, Hideo hails a taxicab and shares it with a couple and an African American foreigner, who are all infected. The foreigner is dropped off at Yokota Air Base and is shot by a guard. The signs of infection begin to manifest in the couple and the cab driver (who was infected by his grandson). Hideo kicks the couple out and the cab driver succumbs to the infection and attacks him, but Hideo is protected by the plastic taxicab partition. The taxi collides head-on with a vehicle driven by another zombie. Running off the highway, Hideo comes across an abandoned amusement park near Mount Fuji and passes out in the underground entrance. After waking up, Hideo decides to traverse the nearby woods. He begins to lose his courage after his cellphone he is using for light loses charge, and experiences various hallucinations before falling asleep. The next day, he wakes up unharmed, and discovers that he is in the Sea of Trees near Mount Fuji. While urinating, he finds another survivor: a student named Hiromi Hayakiri.
04	August 30, 2010	978-4-09-183377-8	October 12, 2016	978-1-5067-0019-9
Hiromi is in the Sea of Trees during a field trip. After she lost at rock paper scissors with her friends, they send Hiromi into the woods as a test of courage. While wandering around, she saw Hideo, whom she thought was a suicidal person, and comforted him (although he didn't know it at the time). Hiromi decides to travel with Hideo. Along the way, they witness peculiar events one after another, such as an apparent awareness in the infected (Hiromi's friends killing one another due to a vendetta) and the public's lack of awareness.
05	December 25, 2010	978-4-09-183534-5	April 05, 2017	978-1-5067-0145-5
They soon find out a crowd of people who heard of a rumor that the thinner air of the mountain will repel the infected. They also meet Araki, a middle-aged man who informs them about Kurusu. Kurusu is a man who claimed he couldn't kill his mother no matter how many times he brutally beat her. In desperation, netizens begin to form a cult centering around Kurusu, declaring him as the leader of the new age that will emerge from the disaster. Hideo tries to research further, but is soon discouraged by false rumors.
06	May 30, 2011	978-4-09-183827-8	April 05, 2017	978-1-5067-0145-5
Hiromi soon falls prey to a bite from an infected baby, but she only becomes partially infected and is able to retain aspects of her humanity. Hideo is able to communicate with her, forging a bond between the two. Though skeptical at first, Araki decides to allow Hiromi to travel together with Hideo and him. They continue further until they come across a small community camping atop a mall, the Gotemba Premium Outlets. The leader, a young adult called Sango, invites the group to stay with them.
07	September 30, 2011	978-4-09-184050-9	August 16, 2017	978-1-5067-0349-7
Sango is the apparent leader of the group, though he is actually controlled by Iura. When the group begins to run low on food, Sango and Iura begin to formulate a plan to seize Hideo's shotgun (the only firearm they have access to). In the process, Hiromi is shot with a nail on her head (though she survives) After they succeed, Hideo is forced to join a search party.
08	January 30, 2012	978-4-09-184246-6	August 16, 2017	978-1-5067-0349-7
The search goes awry, and most of the group, including Sango, are killed. Iura becomes infected, and Araki sacrifices himself to protect a young child. Hideo manages to retrieve his shotgun and escape, along with Hiromi and Yabu Oda, a former nurse who understands the significance of Hiromi's condition in potentially understanding and curing the disease.
09	May 30, 2012	978-4-09-184512-2	January 10, 2018	978-1-5067-0350-3
Yabu finds a hospital for the unconscious Hiromi, but when Hideo scouts it he finds that it is infested with zombies and flees. The group finds a souvenir shop and Hideo searches for food, killing a pregnant zombie in the process.
10	October 30, 2012	978-4-09-184729-4	January 10, 2018	978-1-5067-0350-3
After surgically removing the nail from Hiromi's head, and seeing her recover from the infection, the group is last shown reaching Hakone in order to restock on ammunition and firearms. The story shifts from Hideo's viewpoint to that of a teenager, Takashi Ezaki, who posted a message in a forum, requesting membership in Kurusu's group. He is soon rescued by Kurusu, Kowashi and Danieli. During their escape attempt, Takahashi witnesses the tactics and weaponry used by the group, including flares used to divert attention and crossbows fired by unknown members. Kowashi and Takashi decides to rest under a bridge to spend the night, and Danieli is killed by Kurusu after becoming infected.
11	February 28, 2013	978-4-09-184880-2	May 09, 2018	978-1-5067-0396-1
The next day, Takashi is brought to the group's base, where he meets Tomabechi (the group's weaponsmith and researcher), Kizuki and Haruki (two students), and "Auntie" (the group's caretaker). Tomabechi discusses the Gotemba group's wipeout (the same group Hideo, Yabu, Araki and Hiromi were in), and shows Takashi his research on the zombies' behavior day by day, while Kowashi teaches him how to fight. He also meets Hanyuu and Fuki, the crossbow users, when he was sent by Takashi to bring food and ammunition. Hanyuu, trusting Takashi, decides to tell him his plan: he will escape through a nearby river, together with Fuki, using a boat.
12	June 28, 2013	978-4-09-185240-3	May 09, 2018	978-1-5067-0396-1
After a brief invasion by a zombie and the subsequent infection of a group member, more zombies begin to swarm the house. Takashi distracts them and makes a last stand near a river, falling into it after being overwhelmed and bitten by the zombies. The group near the school is split into two. The crossbow users point their weapons at Tomabechi in order to seize the car and escape, but are killed by Kurusu. Takashi, unexpectedly surviving his apparent death, heads to the school, where he meets a man similar to Kurusu called the "Naked Emperor". The Naked Emperor talks about how he and Takashi have "risen above human beings". They fight (Takashi's physique has improved significantly) until Kurusu interrupts them. He throws Fuki's severed head to the field, enraging Takashi and starting a fight between the three. The next morning, Kurusu's group, with an addition of survivors found in the school, contemplate where to go next. Takashi is shown to be victorious in his fight with Kurusu and the Naked Emperor, donning Kurusu's name, clothing, and sporting long hair, directing the group to Tokyo.
13	October 30, 2013	978-4-09-185574-9	August 01, 2018	978-1-5067-0702-0
The story then switches back to Hideo and his companions. Hiromi has returned to her normal self and Yabu is starting to show signs of being attracted to Hideo, who (along with Hiromi) is now implied to be the same kind of human as Kurusu, the Naked Emperor, and Takashi. The group makes its way to a secluded cabin where Hideo and Yabu have sex. The trio eventually settle for the night and eat heartily as a memorial to the friends that they've lost. The next day, the group decides to visit a local hot spring to clean up.
14	February 28, 2014	978-4-09-185877-1	August 01, 2018	978-1-5067-0702-0
On the way, the group scavenge a burnt out gun shop where Hideo acquires a Miroku MSS-20 bolt-action shotgun and ammunition as well as finding a severely-charred but still-living zombie. They eventually make it to a hot spring in Hakone-Yakumo and Hideo holds off the zombies while the girls bathe. Hideo is partially swallowed by a mutated zombie with four hands and four feet, which seems to be the result of two regular ZQN partially fusing together. He meets Kurusu in a dream-like sequence and runs for his life, with the zombie mirroring his imaginary movements.
15	June 30, 2014	978-4-09-186284-6	November 07, 2018	978-1-5067-0750-1
The mutated zombie escorts the girls to a truck and releases Hideo, then holds off the attacking zombies. The group make their way to a hotel to rest. In the morning, Hideo shows Hiromi how to shoot his shotgun and the girls encounter another double-left-handed zombie while on their way to the beach. While looting a nearby house, Yabu takes a pregnancy test and discovers that she is pregnant, but the father is unknown. That night, Yabu leaves detailed medical instructions for Hideo and Hiromi, and then leaves, not wanting to burden them once her pregnancy advances.
16	December 26, 2014	978-4-09-186668-4	November 07, 2018	978-1-5067-0750-1
When Hideo and Hiromi try to stop Yabu from escaping in a garbage truck, an infected baby bites her and Hiromi is forced to kill her. Meanwhile, a gigantic mass is forming and growing larger by consuming the infected. Hideo and Hiromi head towards Tokyo on bicycle.
17	May 29, 2015	978-4-09-187020-9	February 20, 2019	978-1-5067-0830-0
In Tokyo, Korori, a former manga artist, is the captain of a unit living in a building (Sunshine 60) headed by Asada, a cultist. When running into infected, the unit is forced to abandon their weapons and fights an especially strong infected. Korori's subordinates, discontent with Asada's use of the group, discusses a potential coup. Returning to retrieve the weapons, Korori's unit gets sidetracked.
18	November 30, 2015	978-4-09-187309-5	February 20, 2019	978-1-5067-0830-0
Hideo and Hiromi stop at a fisherman's hut, they drink alcohol, and he takes her virginity. They spot a boat's light and when they get chased by the mass of infected, they manage to jump onto the boat.
19	March 15, 2016	978-4-09-187470-2	June 19, 2019	978-1-5067-0831-7
The fisherman who saves them agrees to take them to Tokyo in exchange for one of Hideo's guns. Two of Asada's men are led into a trap by Kursu's group. They use one of them to infiltrate the building and the infected start storming it. Kurusu telepathically communicates with Hiromi, telling her that the infected are waiting for her. Upon interacting with the fisherman's infected son, Hiromi realizes that she can control the infected and wanted Yabu to die, making the baby bite her. Hiromi meets the mass, says goodbye to Hideo and leaves with it.
20	April 12, 2016	978-4-09-187530-3	June 19, 2019	978-1-5067-0831-7
Chasing the mass, Hideo makes it to Tokyo and is given a kayak by the fisherman, trading his shotgun. Hiromi is integrated into the mass, which at this point has become a gigantic, slim, double-headed creature and is called the Nameless Mass of Brains (NMB) by its inhabitants, communicating with the people inside. The zombies/people integrated into the hive mind, who have regained their sanity, intelligence, emotions, memories and personalities from when they were human, learn of Hiromi's past through the sharing of memories and denounce her for her wish to kill Yabu. Korori's group starts the building's emergency generator, using the reactivated elevator to get to the roof, which has a helicopter. After obtaining a manga from Korori, Asada plans to escape the building using the helicopter.
21	October 28, 2016	978-4-09-189221-8	October 23, 2019	978-1-5067-0832-4
Asada is surrounded by Kurusu's group, which forces him to lead them to the helicopter. Hideo is chased by an infected and runs up an under-construction building near Asada's building. As more infected chase him, he desperately makes it up a construction crane. Hideo finds out that one of the infected promised Yabu to protect him, and she fends off the other infected. Asada kills a mass of his followers using the building's emergency carbon dioxide and orders his insurgents to the roof. Hideo shoots the NMB's eyes, enraging Hiromi.
22	March 30, 2017	978-4-09-189379-6	October 23, 2019	978-1-5067-0832-4
Part of the NMB starts moving towards Hideo. Asada survives and makes it to the roof, getting on the helicopter with Tomei, a member of Kurusu's group with a pilot's license. Korori's group attacks Kurusu, and Hideo, mistaking them as bullies, shoots Korori. However, one of Hideo's manga absorbs the impact. Korori's getting shot makes one of his members, who is like Kurusu, lose control and somehow transform into a large bloated ZQN who absorbs Kurusu, forming a second large infected mass. This new creature's hive mind contains those who have possessed powers like 'Kurusu', including Takashi and the female member who transformed. Believing they are the kings of mankind they agree to protect the remaining humans, helping to fend off the advancing infected. Asada is killed by one of his subordinates, whom he abandoned. Korori and a child manage to escape on the helicopter, along with the auntie they met, and they head towards the Izu Islands. Hideo is nearly suffocated by the NMB, but Hiromi spares him, hoping to make him suffer more by staying alive. After the incident, Hideo is left alone in Tokyo. The infected have all been absorbed by the NMB, which, together with the Kurusu creature, is completely dormant. Nature starts taking over Tokyo, and Hideo, who is getting lonely and hoping for rescue, starts running out of food and a garden he starts fails. However, Hideo discovers a looted gun shop with tools to make buckshots and succeeds, using it to hunt. Note: The 265th epilogue chapter was included in the 22nd volume of the "Complete Edition" digital re-release on December 10, 2021.

=== Spin-offs and other ===
A spin-off, titled I Am a Hero in Osaka (アイアムアヒーロー in Osaka, Ai Amu A Hīrō in Osaka), written and illustrated by Yuuki Honda, was serialized in Shogakukan's Yawaraka Spirits online magazine from January 26 to December 26, 2015. Shogakukan released a compiled tankōbon volume on February 29, 2016. A second spin-off, titled I Am a Hero in Ibaraki (アイアムアヒーロー in Ibaraki, Ai Amu A Hīrō in Ibaraki), written and illustrated by Kazuya Fujisawa, was serialized in Yawaraka Spirits from March 24 to August 25, 2016. Shogakukan released a compiled tankōbon volume on February 28, 2017. A third spin-off, titled I Am a Hero in Nagasaki (アイアムアヒーロー in Nagasaki, Ai Amu A Hīrō in Nagasaki), written and illustrated by Kensuke Nishida, was serialized in Yawaraka Spirits from March 28 to October 20, 2016. Shogakukan released a compiled tankōbon volume on February 28, 2017.

An anthology series by various manga artists, containing 8 short stories, titled I Am a Hero Official Anthology: 8 Tales of the ZQN (アイアムアヒーロー 公式アンソロジーコミック8 TALES OF THE ZQN, Ai Amu A Hīrō Kōshiki Ansorojī 8 TALES OF THE ZQN), was serialized in Big Comic Spirits from February 15 to April 4, 2016. The stories were written by Etsuko Mizusawa, Junji Ito, Masakazu Ishiguro, Tarō Nogizaka, Makoto Ojiro, Mengo Yokoyari, Akane Torikai, and Kōji Yoshimoto. Shogakukan published the compiled volume on April 12, 2016.

=== Live-action film ===
A live-action film adaptation, directed by Shinsuke Sato and starring Yo Oizumi, Kasumi Arimura and Masami Nagasawa, premiered at the Sitges Film Festival on October 13, 2015, and was released commercially on April 23, 2016. The film has been licensed by Funimation, and was released on DVD and Blu-ray on July 24, 2018.

== Reception ==
By November 2015, the manga had 4 million copies in circulation. By November 2021, it had over 8.3 million copies in circulation.

I Am a Hero was nominated for the third, fourth, and fifth Manga Taishō awards. The manga won the 58th Shogakukan Manga Award in the general category in 2013. In a list of "10 Great Zombie Manga", Anime News Network's Jason Thompson placed I Am a Hero at number 1, considering it "probably the greatest zombie manga ever".
