= Vampeerz =

Japanese manga series

- First tankōbon volume cover, featuring Aria (left) and Ichika (right)

ヴァンピアーズ (Vanpiāzu)
- Genre: Vampire, yuri
- Manga
- Written by: Akili
- Published by: Shogakukan
- English publisher: NA: Denpa
- Imprint: Sunday GX Comics
- Magazine: Monthly Sunday Gene-X
- Original run: February 19, 2019 – April 19, 2023
- Volumes: 9
- icon

Vampeerz (Japanese: ヴァンピアーズ, Hepburn: Vanpiāzu) is a Japanese manga series written and illustrated by Akili. It was serialized in Shogakukan's seinen manga magazine Monthly Sunday Gene-X from February 2019 to April 2023, with its chapters collected in nine tankōbon volumes.

== Publication ==
Written and illustrated by Akili, Vampeerz was serialized in Shogakukan's seinen manga magazine Monthly Sunday Gene-X from February 19, 2019, to April 19, 2023. Shogakukan collected its chapters in nine tankōbon volumes, released from August 19, 2019, to June 19, 2023.

In North America, the manga is licensed for English release by Denpa. The first volume was released on June 7, 2022.

=== Volumes ===
No.	Original release date	Original ISBN	English release date	English ISBN
1	August 19, 2019	978-4-09-157573-9	June 7, 2022	978-1-63442-933-7
2	January 17, 2020	978-4-09-157584-5	November 22, 2022	978-1-63442-935-1
3	May 19, 2020	978-4-09-157595-1	September 19, 2023	978-1-63442-832-3
4	October 16, 2020	978-4-09-157610-1	May 21, 2024	978-1-63442-834-7
5	May 19, 2021	978-4-09-157633-0	August 6, 2024	978-1-63442-862-0
6	October 19, 2021	978-4-09-157654-5	December 20, 2025	978-1-63442-877-4
7	April 19, 2022	978-4-09-157677-4	April 16, 2026	978-1-63442-897-2
8	November 17, 2022	978-4-09-157677-4	—	—
9	June 19, 2023	978-4-09-157754-2	—	—
