= Boys on the Run =

Japanese manga series

- First tankōbon volume cover

ボーイズ・オン・ザ・ラン
- Manga
- Written by: Kengo Hanazawa
- Published by: Shogakukan
- Magazine: Big Comic Spirits
- Original run: August 8, 2005 – June 9, 2008
- Volumes: 10
- Live-action film
- Directed by: Daisuke Miura
- Released: January 30, 2010
- Television drama
- Directed by: Jota Tsunehiro, Akihiro Karaki, Ken Higurashi
- Written by: Yuya Takahashi
- Original run: July 6, 2012 – September 7, 2012
- Episodes: 9
- icon

Boys on the Run (Japanese: ボーイズ・オン・ザ・ラン, Hepburn: Bōizu on Za Ran) is a Japanese manga series by Kengo Hanazawa. It was adapted into a live action film in 2010 and a drama in 2012.

== Plot ==
A 27-year-old lonesome salesman falls in love with an attractive woman from work but he has a rival that ends up being with her. He takes up boxing to fight his rival.

== Media ==
=== Manga ===
Written and illustrated by Kengo Hanazawa, Boys on the Run was serialized in Shogakukan's seinen manga magazine Weekly Big Comic Spirits from August 8, 2005, (Note: The series began in the 2005 combined 36th and 37th issue of the magazine (cover date August 22/29), released on August 8, 2005.) to June 9, 2008. Shogakukan collected its chapters in ten tankōbon volumes, released from November 30, 2005 to June 30, 2008.

==== Volumes ====
No.	Release date	ISBN
1	November 30, 2005	978-4091873057
1. "Happy Birthday" (ハッピー・バースデー, Happī Bāsudē); 2. "Chiharu Uemura" (植村ちはる, Chiharu Uemura); 3. "Cicada" (アブラゼミ, Aburazemi); 4. "Run, Melos!" (走れメロス, Hashire Merosu); 5. "The Tactician" (軍師, Gunshi); 6. "Beer Garden" (ビアガーデン, Biagāden); 7. "Low-scoring Game" (貧打戦, Hinda-sen); 8. "Offense and Defense" (トロロの攻防, Tororo no Kōbō); 9. "I'm So Sorry" (ごめんなさい, Gomennasai); 10. "You Are Such An Idiot" (馬鹿だなあ, Baka da Nā)
2	March 30, 2006	978-4091802156
11. "Awakening" (覚醒, Kakusei); 12. "Maxipadded" (ナプキン, Napukin); 13. "Hariti" (鬼子母神, Kishimojin); 14. "Beautiful Sunday" (ビューティフル・サンデー, Byūtifuru Sandē); 15. "39°C"; 16. "Red Light" (花街, Hanamachi); 17. "Sign" (ふう, Fū); 18. "No Makeup" (すっぴん, Suppin); 19. "Catastrophe" (カタストロフィー, Katasutorofī); 20. "Cheers" (乾杯, Kanpai); 21. "Braces" (八重歯だった, Yaeba Datta)
3	June 30, 2006	978-4091804068
22. "Pedestrian Paradise" (歩行者天国, Hokōsha Tengoku); 23. "Avalanche" (雪やこんこん, Yuki ya Konkon); 24. "Peanut Gallery" (傍観者たち, Bōkansha-tachi); 25. "Winter Seaside" (冬の海, Fuyu no Umi); 26. "Full Swing" (たけなわ, Takenawa); 27. "Tsunami" (つなみ, Tsunami); 28. "I'm a Grown-up After All" (大人ですから, Otona Desu kara); 29. "This Means War" (宣戦布告, Sensen Fukoku); 30. "Formal Declaration" (果たし状, Hatashijō); 31. "Drunken Angel" (酔いどれ天使, Yoidore Tenshi); 32. "Subway" (サブウェイ, Sabuwei)
4	September 29, 2006	978-4091807090
33. "Kourakuen Hall" (後楽園ホール, Kōrakuen Hōru); 34. "You're the Best, Around" (あんたが大将, Anta ga Taishō); 35. "Fourth Round Kid" (4回戦ボーイ, Yonkaisen Bōi); 36. "Hands and Knees" (土下座, Dogeza); 37. "A Woman's Heart" (オンナゴコロ, Onnagokoro); 38. "Pistols at Dawn" (真昼の決闘, Mahiru no Kettō); 39. "Salty" (しょっぱい, Shoppai); 40. "Who's the One In Charge" (決めるのは誰だ, Kimeru no wa Dareda); 41. "A Man's Man" (オトコマエ, Otokomae); 42. "Bandage" (バンテージ, Bantēji); 43. "Greetings" (ご挨拶, Goaisatsu)
5	January 30, 2007	978-4-09-181056-4
44. "Champions in Komagata" (駒形代理戦争, Komagata Dairisensō); 45. "Evil Woman" (悪い女, Warui Onna); 46. "Capoeirista" (カポエリスト, Kapoerisuto); 47. "The Mount" (マウント, Maunto); 48. "Waking Up" (夢のあと, Yume no Ato); 49. "Asama 533" (あさま533号, Asama 533-gō); 50. "Oh Pall Pall" (オーパルパル, Ō Paru Paru); 51. "Won-Il Dong" (ワノルドン, Wanoru Don); 52. "Comeback" (カンバック, Kanbakku); 53. "Wrong Side of the Tracks" (高架下, Kōka Shita); 54. "Sakurada Boxing" (櫻田ボクシングジム, Sakurada Bokushingu Jimu)
6	May 30, 2007	978-4-09-181195-0
55. "And You Are" (君の名は, Kimi no Na wa); 56. "Shakin'" (ゆれる, Yureru); 57. "Ryu Ando" (安藤龍, Andō Ryū); 58. "Passing Notes" (筆談, Hitsudan); 59. "Heavy" (ヘヴィー, Hevī); 60. "180 Seconds" (180秒, 180 Byō); 61. "Spar" (マス, Masu); 62. "Gong" (ゴング, Gongu); 63. "Him" (あの男, Ano Otoko); 64. "Speak No Evil" (三匹, Sanbiki); 65. "In the Still of the Night" (夜のしじま, Yoru no Shijima)
7	August 30, 2007	978-4-09-181429-6
66. "Touch" (タッチ, Tatchi); 67. "Stoic" (ストイック, Sutoikku); 68. "In Theory" (セオリー, Seorī); 69. "Punk" (チン, Chin); 70. "Drive" (ドライブ, Doraibu); 71. "Toy" (おもちゃ, Omocha); 72. "Laundry" (ランドリー, Randorī); 73. "He's Back" (帰ってきた男, Kaettekita Otoko); 74. "KO"; 75. "Ruins" (廃墟, Haikyo); 76. "Hero" (主人公, Shujinkō)
8	December 26, 2007	978-4-09-181568-2
77. "Burning Up" (田西炎上, Tanishi Enjō); 78. "Final Boss" (ラスボス, Rasu Bosu); 79. "Some Kind of Madness" (狂気一丁, Kyōki Itchō); 80. "Time to Go" (家に帰ろ, Ie ni Kaero); 81. "House Call" (お見舞い, Omimai); 82. "Tsunami"; 83. "Terminal Love" (激情ターミナル, Gekijō Tāminaru); 84. "Woman from Nagano" (長野のひと, Nagano no Hito); 85. "Rough Sketch" (クロッキー, Kurokkī); 86. "Things Will Never Be the Same" (その時、歴史は動いた, Sono toki, Rekishi wa Ugoita); 87. "I Love You" (あなたが好き, Anata ga Suki)
9	April 26, 2008	978-4-09-181858-4
88. "Why Can't We Be Friends" (けんかをやめて, Kenka o Yamete); 89. "Scars" (ためらい傷, Tamerai Kizu); 90. "Rest Stop" (ご休憩, Gokyūkei); 91. "Back to the City" (帰京, Kikyō); 92. "Back to the Gym" (ジム再訪, Jimu Saihō); 93. "Zero" (ゼロ, Zero); 94. "Game Over" (ゲームオーバー, Gēmu Ōbā); 95. "Spark" (火花, Hibana); 96. "I'm Sorry" (ごめんなさい, Gomennasai); 97. "The Comeback Kid" (大回転男, Daikai Utate Otoko); 98. "Direct Involvement" (直談判, Jikadanpan); 99. "300 Grand Girl" (30万の女, 30-man no Onna); 100. "Love, Fight, Cash" (愛と拳と福沢諭吉, Ai to Kobushi to Fukuzawa Yukichi)
10	June 30, 2008	978-4-09-182049-5
101. "Voiceless Scream" (声なき悲鳴, Koe Naki Himei); 102. "National Language" (国語, Kokugo); 103. "Wrapped In Korean Lettuce" (サンチュに巻いてね, Sanchu ni Maite ne); 104. "Lingering Affection" (未練, Miren); 105. "Believe In Me" (信じろ, Shinjiro); 106. "After School" (放課後, Hōkago); 107. "Triangle" (トライアングル, Toraianguru); 108. "Rice Crackers, Coffee, Oolong Tea" (せんべいコーヒーウーロン茶, Senbei Kōhī Ūroncha); 109. "Let's Have a War" (戦争しましょう, Sensō Shimashō); 110. "Perverted Old Man Sadoshima-sensei" (変態老人・佐渡島先生, Hentai Rōjin Sadoshima Sensei); 111. "Escape from Shoutou" (松濤からの脱出, Shōtō kara no Dasshutsu); 112. "Damn Stubborn" (クソ意地, Kuso Iji); 113. "Boxing" (ボクシング, Bokushingu); 114. "My Boy" (マイボーイ, Mai Bōi); Last Chapter. "Have You Ever Seen the Rainbow?" (虹を見たかい？, Niji o Mita kai?)

=== Film ===
==== Cast ====
- Kazunobu Mineta - Tanishi Toshiyuki
- Mei Kurokawa
- You

=== Drama ===
==== Cast ====
- Ryuhei Maruyama - Tanishi Toshiyuki
- Airi Taira - Hana Ooiwa
- Takumi Saito - Takahiro Aoyama
- Tatsuya Ueda - Ryu Ando
- Akina Minami - Chiharu Uemura
- Miyoko Asada - Masako Tanishi
- Eriko Sato - Shiho
- Takanori Jinnai -Suzuki
- Seishu Uragami - Shu Shishido
- Yu Tokui - Kazuo Tanishi
- Morooka Moro - Saida
- David Ito - Tanaka
- Asami Usuda - Akane Hasegawa
- Atsushi - Yoshihisa

==== Episodes ====
No.	Title	Original release date
1	"Happy Birthday" (Japanese: Happy Birthday)	July 6, 2012
2	"Cheers"; Transliteration: "Kanpai" (Japanese: 乾杯)	July 13, 2012
3	"Declaration of War"; Transliteration: "Sensen Fukoku" (Japanese: 宣戦布告)	July 27, 2012
4	"High Noon Duel"; Transliteration: "Mahiru no Kettō" (Japanese: 真昼の決闘)	August 3, 2012
5	"I Like You"; Transliteration: "Anata ga Suki" (Japanese: あなたが好き)	August 10, 2012
6	"Bad Girl"; Transliteration: "Warui On'na" (Japanese: 悪い女)	August 17, 2012
7	"The Return of the Man"; Transliteration: "Kaettekita Otoko" (Japanese: 帰ってきた男)	August 24, 2012
8	"Love, Fists and Fuzukawa Yukichi"; Transliteration: "Ai to Ken to Fuzukawa Yukichi" (Japanese: 愛と拳と福沢諭吉)	August 31, 2012
9	"Last Run"; Transliteration: "Rasuto Ran" (Japanese: ラストラン)	September 7, 2012
