= Denpa (company) =

American publishing company

- Founded: 2018; 7 years ago
- Founders: Ed Chavez, Jacob Grady
- Headquarters location: Portland, Oregon, U.S.
- Distribution: Consortium
- Official website: Official website

DENPA LLC is an American publishing company located in Portland, Oregon. The company was established in 2018 and it was announced at Otakon in August of the same year by Ed Chavez, former Vertical marketing director and vice president of Fakku.

Denpa also has an imprint named Kuma, which publishes boys' love works.

== Titles ==
- An Invitation from a Crab by Panpanya
- Baby Bear's Bakery by Kamentotsu
- Fate/Grand Order: Chaldea Scrapbook by Nakatani
- Futurelog by Range Murata
- Gambling Apocalypse: Kaiji by Nobuyuki Fukumoto
- The Girl with the Sanpaku Eyes by Shunsuke Sorato
- Guyabano Holiday by Panpanya
- Heavenly Delusion by Masakazu Ishiguro
- Inside Mari by Shūzō Oshimi
- Lil' Leo by Moto Hagio
- Lockdown Zone: Level X by Romy Oishi and Meshe
- March Comes In like a Lion by Chica Umino
- Maiden Railways by Asumiko Nakamura
- Miss Kusakabe by Shūzō Oshimi
- The Men Who Created Gundam by Hideki Ohwada
- Mobile Suit Gundam: Char's Counterattack – Beltorchika's Children by Uroaki Sabishi and Takayuki Yanase
- Nana & Kaoru by Ryuta Amazume
- Odd Taxi by Kazuya Konomoto, P.I.C.S, and Takeichi Abaraya
- PEZ by Hiroyuki Asada
- Pleasure & Corruption by You Someya
- Rakuda Laughs by Katsuya Terada
- Renjoh Desperado by Ahndongshik
- Shino Can't Say Her Name by Shūzō Oshimi
- Short Game by Mitsuru Adachi
- Super Dimensional Love Gun by Shintaro Kago (previously published by Fakku)
- Tawawa on Monday by Kiseki Himura
- They Were Eleven by Moto Hagio
- Today's Menu for Emiya Family by TAa
- Under Ninja by Kengo Hanazawa
- Urotsukidōji by Toshio Maeda (previously published by Fakku)
- Vampeerz by Akili
