= Kengo Hanazawa =

Japanese manga artist (born 1974)

Kengo Hanazawa 花沢 健吾
- Born: January 5, 1974 (age 52) Hachinohe, Japan
- Area: Manga artist
- Notable works: I Am a Hero

Kengo Hanazawa (花沢 健吾, Hanazawa Kengo; born January 5, 1974) is a Japanese manga artist, known for his seinen works. He won the Topic Award of the 2005 Sense of Gender Awards for Ressentiment and was nominated for the 3rd, 4th and 5th Manga Taisho for I Am a Hero. In 2013, I Am a Hero won the 58th Shogakukan Manga Award in the General category. I Am a Hero has received a live-action film adaptation, directed by Shinsuke Sato. His series Boys on the Run was also adapted into a live-action film in 2010. He formerly worked as Osamu Uoto's assistant.

== Works ==
- Ressentiment (2004–2005, Big Comic Spirits, Shogakukan)
- Boys on the Run (2005–2008, Big Comic Spirits, Shogakukan)
- I Am a Hero (2009–2017, Big Comic Spirits, Shogakukan)
- Under Ninja (2018–present, Weekly Young Magazine, Kodansha)
