= Ultraman Geed =

2017 Japanese TV series

- Title card
- Genre: Superhero; Tokusatsu; Kaiju; Science fiction Humor; Drama; Kyodai Hero
- Written by: Hirotaka Adachi; Uiko Miura; Sachio Yanai; Misaki Morie; Junichiro Ashiki; Toshizo Nemoto; Kyoko Katsuya
- Directed by: Koichi Sakamoto; Ryuichi Ichino; Masayoshi Takesue; Suguru Tomita; Kiyotaka Taguchi; Ryo Ikeda; Ryoichi Ito
- Starring: Tatsuomi Hamada; Chihiro Yamamoto; Mayu Hasegawa; Yuta Ozawa; Kunito Watanabe; Tadashi Mizuno
- Voices of: Mamoru Miyano; Yūki Ono
- Opening theme: "Geed no Akashi" by by Riku Asakura with Voyager
- Ending theme: "Kibō no Kakera" by by Voyager
- Composer: Kenji Kawai
- Country of origin: Japan
- Original language: Japanese
- No. of episodes: 25

Production
- Producers: Yukinobu Tsuruta; Yoshino Aya (TV Tokyo); Hayato Saga (Dentsu)
- Running time: 30 minutes
- Production companies: Tsuburaya Productions; TV Tokyo; Dentsu

Original release
- Network: TXN (TV Tokyo)
- Release: July 8 – December 23, 2017

Related
- Ultraman Orb: The Origin Saga; Ultraman R/B

Ultraman Geed (ウルトラマンジード, Urutoraman Jīdo) is a Japanese tokusatsu drama produced by Tsuburaya Productions and the 22nd entry (31st overall) to the Ultra Series. It aired on TV Tokyo from July 8, 2017, to December 23, 2017. The series is simulcast outside Japan by Crunchyroll.

The main catchphrase is "Fate – prepare for it." (運命 – 覚悟を決めろ。, Unmei – kakugo o kimero.).

== Synopsis ==
Ultraman Geed, the series' titular character. His jagged eyes are the defining trait from his father, Belial.

In the past, a terrifying war raged across the universe, devastating countless planets, instigated by Ultraman Belial and his army. At the climax of the war, hereafter referred to as the Omega Armageddon, Belial defeated the Ultras in battle, then activated a bomb which blew apart the Earth and initiated the Crisis Impact, an apocalyptic event. The Ultras could only watch as the Crisis Impact threatened the universe with destruction, before Ultraman King sacrificed his corporeal form to save everything, essentially becoming the universe's host.

In the present day, Kei Fukuide, an alien from the ruined Planet Sturm and one of Belial's allies, infiltrates the Land of Light and steals the Ultra Capsules - an invention developed by Ultraman Hikari that serve to contain a fraction of a specific Ultra's powers - then reverse engineers them into Kaiju Capsules. Meanwhile, on Earth, Riku Asakura is a teenager with no knowledge of his past, save for being found near an astronomical observatory as a baby following the Crisis Impact. When a giant monster destroys his home, Riku and his alien roommate Pega stumble upon a secret base 500 meters below the ground. Riku learns he is an Ultraman in human form and is given the ability to use the Geed Riser transformation device and Ultra Capsules by the base's operating system RE.M. to become Ultraman Geed to save everyone.

Deciding to fight against fate, he is joined by monster hunter Laiha Toba, AIB agent Moa Aizaki, and office worker Leito Igaguri, who becomes the host of Belial's nemesis Ultraman Zero. Riku soon learns that the monsters he faces are Fusion Rise forms of Kei Fukuide, who seeks those who are hosts to unformed Ultra Capsules called Little Stars. In the middle of the series, Riku discovered that he was a clone of Belial manufactured by Kei to gather the Ultra Capsules in order to revive the dark Ultra. At some point of time, Belial returned to Earth and kidnapped his son in an attempt to sway the latter to his side but failed due to Ultraman King and Laiha's intervention. With the power bestowed by Ultraman King, Geed received a new form known as Royal Mega-Master and defeated his father.

With Belial seemingly dead, an amnesiac Kei attempts to continue his master's legacy, and is taken in by Arie Ishikari, a nonfiction author who is secretly Belial's host, having been selected after his initial defeat. Eventually, Belial launches his final attack, stealing Kei's Sturm Organ, using its Carellen Element to absorb vast quantities of King's essence, the Childhood Radiation. Having taken on a new form dubbed Belial Atrocious, Belial intends to destroy Earth, then the Land of Light. Zero succeeded in separating Ultraman King from Belial while Father of Ultra came to Earth and sealed him within a barrier. The next day, Riku took matters on his own as he fights his father in one-on-one combat with his will allowing Ultraman King to summon copies of his Fusion Rise forms into his aid. In the midst of the final battle, a delirious Kei, near death due to the loss of his Sturm Organ, attempts to menace Leito's family, only to be confronted by Laiha, who defeats him in a sword fight. Mortally wounded, Kei asks if he was really just another pawn to Belial, before dissolving into green particles and dying. At the climax of his battle with Belial, Riku tried to understand his father's pain and suffering from his banishment, but was forced to kill him when Belial continued his attack. With the fight over, a fully healed Zero joined Father of Ultra and Ultraman King as they left Earth and Riku resumed his normal life.

== Episodes ==
No.	Title	Written by	Original release date
SP	"Ultraman Geed Preview Special"; Transliteration: "Urutoraman Jīdo Chokuzen Supesharu" (Japanese: ウルトラマンジード直前スペシャル)	Junichiro Ashiki	July 1, 2017
1	"Welcome to the Secret Base"; Transliteration: "Himitsu Kichi e Yōkoso" (Japanese: 秘密基地へようこそ)	Hirotaka Adachi	July 8, 2017
2	"The Girl Who Cuts Monsters"; Transliteration: "Kaijū o Kiru Shōjo" (Japanese: 怪獣を斬る少女)	Hirotaka Adachi	July 15, 2017
3	"Salaryman Zero"; Transliteration: "Sararīman Zero" (Japanese: サラリーマンゼロ)	Hirotaka Adachi	July 22, 2017
4	"A Job Where You Investigate Aliens"; Transliteration: "Seijin o Ō Shigoto" (Japanese: 星人を追う仕事)	Hirotaka Adachi	July 29, 2017
5	"Partners"; Transliteration: "Aikata" (Japanese: あいかた)	Uiko Miura	August 5, 2017
6	"So That I Can Be Me"; Transliteration: "Boku ga Boku de Aru Koto" (Japanese: 僕が僕であること)	Uiko Miura	August 12, 2017
7	"Sacrifice"; Transliteration: "Sakurifaisu" (Japanese: サクリファイス)	Sachio Yanai	August 19, 2017
8	"Going Beyond Fate"; Transliteration: "Unmei o Koeteike" (Japanese: 運命を越えて行け)	Sachio Yanai	August 26, 2017
9	"The Sword of an Oath"; Transliteration: "Chikai no Tsurugi" (Japanese: 誓いの剣)	Uiko Miura	September 2, 2017
10	"I Read Minds"; Transliteration: "Kokoro Yomemasu" (Japanese: ココロヨメマス)	Misaki Morie	September 9, 2017
11	"The Geed Identity"; Transliteration: "Jīdo Aidentitī" (Japanese: ジードアイデンティティー)	Hirotaka Adachi	September 15, 2017
12	"My Name"; Transliteration: "Boku no Namae" (Japanese: 僕の名前)	Hirotaka Adachi	September 23, 2017
13	"Restore Memories"; Transliteration: "Resutoa Memorīzu" (Japanese: レストア・メモリーズ)	Junichiro Ashiki	September 30, 2017
14	"Shadows of Shadows"; Transliteration: "Shadō no Kage" (Japanese: シャドーの影)	Toshizo Nemoto	October 7, 2017
15	"Child of Battle"; Transliteration: "Tatakai no Ko" (Japanese: 戦いの子)	Toshizo Nemoto	October 14, 2017
16	"The First Day of the End of the World"; Transliteration: "Sekai no Owari ga Hajimaru Hi" (Japanese: 世界の終わりが始まる日)	Hirotaka Adachi	October 21, 2017
17	"The King's Miracle! Time to Change Fate!!"; Transliteration: "Kingu no Kiseki! Kaeru ze! Unmei!!" (Japanese: キングの奇跡！変えるぜ！運命！！)	Hirotaka Adachi	October 28, 2017
18	"Inheritor of the Dream"; Transliteration: "Yume o Tsugu Mono" (Japanese: 夢を継ぐ者)	Sachio Yanai	November 4, 2017
19	"Nebula House Invasion"; Transliteration: "Ubawareta Seiun-sō" (Japanese: 奪われた星雲荘)	Kyoko Katsuya	November 11, 2017
20	"The 10:00 AM Monsterous Bird"; Transliteration: "Gozen Jū-ji no Kaichō" (Japanese: 午前10時の怪鳥)	Uiko Miura	November 18, 2017
21	"Pega Runs Away from Home"; Transliteration: "Pega, Iede Suru" (Japanese: ペガ、家出する)	Misaki Morie	November 25, 2017
22	"Repossession"; Transliteration: "Dakkan" (Japanese: 奪還)	Uiko Miura	December 2, 2017
23	"The Sturm's Light"; Transliteration: "Sutorumu no Hikari" (Japanese: ストルムの光)	Uiko Miura	December 9, 2017
24	"The Fragments of Hope"; Transliteration: "Kibō no Kakera" (Japanese: キボウノカケラ)	Hirotaka Adachi	December 16, 2017
25	"The Symbol of Geed"; Transliteration: "Jīdo no Akashi" (Japanese: GEEDの証)	Hirotaka Adachi	December 23, 2017

== Ultraman Geed the Movie ==
Ultraman Geed the Movie (劇場版 ウルトラマンジード つなぐぜ! 願い!!, Gekijō-ban Urutoraman Jīdo Tsunagu ze! Negai!!; also called "Ultraman Geed The Movie: Connect the Wishes!") was released on March 10, 2018.

== Other appearances ==
=== Film and team-up ===
- Ultraman Geed made his debut in the final scene of Ultra Fight Orb, where he was shown killing Reibatos when other Ultras assumed him to have died after being defeated by Ultraman Orb, though this appearance was later proven false, as shown in the series finale in which Belial was the one who killed Reibatos.
- Ultraman R/B the Movie (2018): See here
- Ultra Galaxy Fight: New Generation Heroes/Ultraman Taiga (2019)/Ultraman Taiga The Movie (2020): See here
- Ultraman Z (2020): See here

== Production ==
In the early days after receiving the plan, I received an e-mail from Tsuburaya stating "How about the main hero is Belial's son?". But a while ago, I also found the theme of "Belial's son" is quite funny and interesting. It seems that it was suggested in reverse to main proposal I made. I was surprised to see it as a coincidence. It was like a mysterious feeling that my mind was read without my own permission.

— Comments by Otsuichi.

The Ultraman Geed trademark was filed by Tsuburaya Productions on March 6, 2017. The series was announced on April 27, 2017, by the official website of Tsuburaya Productions and Sports Hochi. The main actor Tatsuomi Hamada mentioned that becoming an Ultraman is a childhood dream since his kindergarten. As he had once played Nao, one of the protagonists in the 2010 Ultra Series movie Ultraman Zero: The Revenge of Belial, he is also excited to view Belial as a father instead of an antagonist of the previous movie while his character grew up and faced his destiny.

According to Koichi Sakamoto, he views Riku as a man who fights as Belial's son while facing challenges without getting bound by the "common senses of an Ultraman series". As the show revolves around a protagonist fighting with the blood of a villain, he related the plot towards that of Devilman. Writer Otsuichi mentioned that he used to watch Ultraman X and Ultraman Orb with his son back home and was advised to use Arthur C. Clarke's novel Childhood's End as a reference material for the first stage of the project. Said author's name becomes the foundation of the main character's name, Riku Asakura. The theme of Riku being Belial's son was an idea he thought of but never expected it to be conceptualized by Tsuburaya themselves. He stresses the difficulty of writing the script of the first episode, with the Ultra and the transformation item that were yet to be named. He is also well-aware that this is not the first tokusatsu series to be written by a novelist, as this was preceded by Gen Urobuchi in Kamen Rider Gaim.

== Cast ==
- Riku Asakura (朝倉 リク, Asakura Riku)/Ultraman Geed (Voice): Tatsuomi Hamada (濱田 龍臣, Hamada Tatsuomi)
- Laiha Toba (鳥羽 ライハ, Toba Raiha): Chihiro Yamamoto (山本 千尋, Yamamoto Chihiro)
- Moa Aizaki (愛崎 モア, Aizaki Moa): Mayu Hasegawa (長谷川 眞優, Hasegawa Mayu)
- Leito Igaguri (伊賀栗 レイト, Igaguri Reito): Yuta Ozawa (小澤 雄太, Ozawa Yūta)
- Kei Fukuide (伏井出 ケイ, Fukuide Kei): Kunito Watanabe (渡辺 邦斗, Watanabe Kunito)
- Rumina Igaguri (伊賀栗 ルミナ, Igaguri Rumina): Hitomi Hasebe (長谷部 瞳, Hasabe Hitomi)
- Mayu Igaguri (伊賀栗 マユ, Igaguri Mayu): Mirei Shimizu (清水 美怜, Shimizu Mirei)
- Alien Shadow "Zenna" (シャドー星人 ゼナ, Shadō Seijin Zena; Human): Hideyoshi Iwata (岩田 栄慶, Iwata Hideyoshi)
- Haruo Kume (久米 ハルヲ, Kume Haruo)): Tadashi Mizuno (水野 直, Mizuno Tadashi)
- Newscaster: Chisato Kawai (川合 千里, Kawai Chisato)
- Jōji Ōsumi (大隅 丈治, Ōsumi Jōji): Kenji Masaki (柾 賢志, Masaki Kenji)
- Arie Ishikari (石刈 アリエ, Ishikari Arie): Ryoko Kobayashi (小林 涼子, Kobayashi Ryōko)

=== Voice cast ===
- Alien Pegassa "Pega" (ペガッサ星人 ペガ, Pegassa Seijin Pega): Megumi Han (潘 めぐみ, Han Megumi)
- RE.M. (レム, Remu): Suzuko Mimori (三森 すずこ, Mimori Suzuko)
- Alien Shadow "Zenna": Shintarō Asanuma (浅沼 晋太郎, Asanuma Shintarō)
- Ultraman Zero (ウルトラマンゼロ, Urutoraman Zero): Mamoru Miyano (宮野 真守, Miyano Mamoru)
- Ultraman Belial (ウルトラマンベリアル, Urutoraman Beriaru): Yūki Ono (小野 友樹, Ono Yūki)
- Riser (ライザー, Raizā; Ultra Capsule scan), Ultraman King (ウルトラマンキング, Urutoraman Kingu): Nobuyuki Hiyama (檜山 修之, Hiyama Nobuyuki)
- Riser (Monster Capsule scan), Narrator (0), Lecuum (レキューム人, Rekyūmu Jin; 20): Kenta Matsumoto (松本 健太, Matsumoto Kenta)

=== Guest cast ===
- Yoshiko Hara (原 良子, Hara Yoshiko; 1–2): Hitomi Miwa (三輪 ひとみ, Miwa Hitomi)
- Sui Asakura (朝倉 錘, Asakura Sui; 12): Minori Terada (寺田 農, Terada Minori)
- Kuruto Kageyama (影山 来人, Kageyama Kuruto; 14–15): Hiroki Suzuki (鈴木 裕樹, Suzuki Hiroki)
- Fujio Manga (満賀 富士夫, Manga Fujio; 16–17): Catcher Nakazawa (キャッチャー中澤, Kyatchā Nakazawa)

== Songs ==
Opening theme

- "Geed no Akashi" (GEEDの証, Jīdo no Akashi; lit. "The Symbol of Geed")
  - Lyrics: Sumiyo Mutsumi (六ツ見 純代, Mutsumi Sumiyo)
  - Composition & Arrangement: Kenji Kawai (川井 憲次, Kawai Kenji)
  - Artists: Riku Asakura (Tatsuomi Hamada) with Voyager (ボイジャー, Boijā)
  - Episodes: 1–17 (Verse 1), 18–24 (Verse 2)

Ending theme

- "Kibō no Kakera" (キボウノカケラ; lit. "The Fragments of Hope")
  - Lyrics: TAKERU, Chiaki Seshimo (瀬下 千晶, Seshimo Chiaki)
  - Composition & Arrangement: Takao Konishi (小西 貴雄, Konishi Takao)
  - Artists: Voyager
  - Episodes: 1-17 (Verse 1), 18-25 (Verse 2)

== International broadcast ==
In Hong Kong, this series aired on ViuTV on July 21, 2018. In Indonesia, this series aired on RTV (Indonesian TV channel) on October 9, 2018. In the Philippines, this series will set to air on TV5 soon.

== See also ==
- Ultra Series - Complete list of official Ultraman-related shows.
