= Chihiro Yamamoto =

Japanese actress (born 1996)

- 山本 千尋
- Born: August 29, 1996 (age 30); Kobe, Hyogo Prefecture, Japan
- Occupations: Actress, tai chi practitioner
- Years active: 2014–present

Chihiro Yamamoto (山本 千尋, Yamamoto Chihiro; born August 29, 1996) is a Japanese actress, who has played in various Tokusatsu series. Her prominent role in the Ultra Series is Laiha Toba of Ultraman Geed.

== Filmography ==
=== TV series ===
Year	Series	Character	Notes	Ref(s)
2016	Shuriken Sentai Ninninger	Kikyo Kousaka	Episodes: 29-30	
2022	The 13 Lords of the Shogun	Tō	Taiga drama	
2022	Alice in Borderland	Risa	Season 2	
2024	Captured New Airport	"Sheep"		
2025	Masked Ninja Akakage	Yamihime		

=== Film ===
Year	Film/Telemovie	Character	Notes	Ref(s)
2015	Chambara: The Art of Japanese Swordplay	Herself		
2019	Blackfox: Age of the Ninja	Rikka Isurugi	Leading role	
2019	Last Ninja: Blue Shadow	Rin		
2022	Kingdom 2: Far and Away	Qiang Xiang		
2024	Honeko Akabane's Bodyguards	Yamihime Higure		
2025	Under Ninja	Mitsuki Yamada		
2026	Ninja Wars: Blackfox vs. Shogun's Ninja	Rikka Isurugi	Leading role	
2027	School Meals Time: Umasoge Kingdom	Miharu Taira		

=== Video games ===
Year	Game	Character	Notes	Ref(s)
2018	Blade Strangers	Curly Brace		
2020	Death Come True	Nene Kurushima		
