= Ultraman Jack (character) =

Fictional Japanese superhero

- Ultra Series character
- Ultraman Jack in Return of Ultraman
- First appearance: Return of Ultraman (1971–1972)
- Designed by: Masahiro Sueyasu
- Portrayed by: Eiichi Kikuchi
- Voiced by: Masao Nakasone (grunt) Japanese: Isao Yatsu (1971); Ichirō Murakoshi (1972); Takashi Takeuchi (1974); Masayuki Omoro (1984); Shigeki Kagemaru (1996); Jirō Dan (2006–2017); Keiji Fujiwara (2015 motion comic); Ryota Takeuchi (2019 anime); Shinichiro Miki (Current); English: Brad Potts (William Winckler Productions); Robbie Daymond (2019 anime)

In-universe information
- Aliases: Ultraman; Jack; Returned Ultraman; New Ultraman; Ultraman II
- Affiliation: Inter-Galactic Defense Force; Ultra Brothers
- Weapon: Ultra Bracelet
- Family: Unnamed wife; Ultraman Taro (nephew); Ultraman Ace (adopted nephew); Ultraman Taiga (grandnephew)
- Origin: Nebula M78, the Land of Light

Ultraman Jack (ウルトラマンジャック, Urutoraman Jakku) is the protagonist of the 1971–1972 tokusatsu Ultra Series, Return of Ultraman. Sometime after Ultraseven's departure, Earth had entered a period of peace until a string of incidents wherein monsters awakened from slumber, appearing one after another. Jack bonded with the race car driver Hideki Go to save his life and as the former's means to operate on Earth while they joined MAT to fight against monster attacks and alien invasions.

Return of Ultraman marks the connection of Ultraman and Ultraseven as Ultra Series installments, which eventually lead to multiple sequels and spin-offs for Tsuburaya Productions with various heroes named after it. Additionally, Return of Ultraman also served as a milestone celebration for the fifth anniversary of Ultraman and the newly established Ultra Series. Following Jack's departure in the final episode, the series would be succeeded by Ultraman Ace, Ultraman Taro and Ultraman Leo before entering a hiatus, a trend which can still be seen to this day. Even with his series ended, Jack would make returning appearances in recent media of the Ultra Series.

In Return of Ultraman, Ultraman Jack's lines were provided by Isao Yatsu (谷津 勲, Yatsu Isao; 1, 18, 30, 31, 37) and Ichirō Murakoshi (村越 伊知郎, Murakoshi Ichirō; 50), both of whom even voiced several of the aliens that appeared, including the original Ultraman and Ultraseven's returning appearances. His grunts, however, were recycled from those of the original Ultraman, provided by Masao Nakasone (中曽根雅夫, Nakasone Masao). Meanwhile, his suit actor was Eiichi Kikuchi (きくち 英一, Kikuchi Eiichi), who previously portrayed Ultraseven in episodes 14 and 15 of his series, including the monster Zazarn in episode 1 of Return of Ultraman. Kikuchi also made his cameo appearances as steerman Kawasaki (13) and a MAT communication officer (51).

== Character conception ==
The entire project began with a book published on April 28, 1969, starting from Ultraman Continues (続ウルトラマン, Zoku Urutoraman), featuring the return of the original Ultraman and the establishment of the attack team MAT. The book's setting was that Ultraman returned to Earth 30 years after the end of his titular series. In the planned third volume, Muramatsu and Hayata of the Science Special Search Party were meant to return, and a character named Hideki Ban (バン・ヒデキ（晩 日出輝）, Ban Hideki) would inherit the Beta Capsule and bond with Ultraman.

In contrast to Shin Hayata and Dan Moroboshi, Jack's host, Hideki Go, is portrayed as a man who has a private life outside of his duty as a MAT officer, including his aspiration as a race car driver, living with the Sakata siblings and having a neighbor named Rumiko Murano. In addition, the protagonist is a person who had the abilities of Ultraman, thus outclassing fellow MAT members in terms of skills, and emphasized the efforts shown to overcome daily difficulties. The injuries and struggles from fighting monsters were also passed onto the human identity. This kind of setting would be known as "Human Ultraman" (人間ウルトラマン, Ningen Urutoraman).

=== Design ===
The designer of Ultraman Jack was ambiguous as, according to the art staff, Akihiko Takahashi (高橋 昭彦, Takahashi Akihiko) was said to be in charge of the main design, but said artist denied his participation as he believed that the design's brush style was "akin to that of Noriyoshi Ikeya (池谷 仙克, Ikeya Norihoshi)", with the latter likewise choosing not to acknowledge it as his own work. The initial design was made by then-manager of Tsuburaya Production's sales management Masahiro Sueyasu (末安 正博, Sueyasu Masahiro) by adding lines on it under the impression that he was the original Ultraman. The first suit was based on this design and filming started at that moment. (Note: The suit itself is based on the original Ultraman Type C suit, with a bigger chest and bigger shoulders. Early publicity photos also showed this suit.) However, under the request of the toy company Bullmark, who acquired the commercialization rights for this series, the design had to be changed, as the character needed to be clearly differentiated from the original Ultraman, and thus his scenes needed to be re-shot with a new suit.

His mask was molded on the original Ultraman's Type C mask (Note: Certain sources even claimed it to be re-molded from Zoffy's mask.) by both Kaigome Production and Hiruma Model Craft. At the time for the photo session for the first suit, the eye positions have changed, as they were slightly dragged upwards from the original and the back of the eyes were molded through transparent epoxy resin.

At the beginning of the season, viewer ratings gradually decreased and various empowerment techniques were devised. The Ultra Bracelet, Jack's main weapon, was one of them. Producer Yōji Hashimoto was initially outraged because it deviated from the original theme of "overwhelming the monster in the end with hardship," but decided to adopt it from the opinion that "the Ultraman was too weak".

=== Naming ===
The show's title, Return of Ultraman, was meant to emphasize the return of the original Ultraman but, due to the sponsor's wishes that it should be a different being as a result of commercialization development, this character in the end became a different being.

The show's title was conceived by the late Eiji Tsuburaya.

In the series proper, he was only called Ultraman (ウルトラマン, Urutoraman), due to being a remnant from the idea that Jack and the original one were the same being. To distinguish the two, the 1966 hero was called Original Ultraman (初代ウルトラマン, Shodai Urutoraman). Also, due to succeeding Ultra Brothers members had names of their own, "Jack" at that moment was only known by older fans as "the nameless hero".

The 1971–1972 Ultraman would later be called by three different names in succeeding media up to Leo:

- From episode 14 of Ultraman Ace, Seiji Hokuto and Yapool called him Ultraman II (ウルトラマンII世, Urutoraman Nisei).
- In the narration of Taro and Leo, he was called New Ultraman (新ウルトラマン, Shin Urutoraman). Shortened as New Man (新マン, Shinman).
- The opening credits of Taro episode 52 and Leo episode 34 credited his name as Returned Ultraman (帰ってきたウルトラマン, Kaettekita Urutoraman), based on the name of his show. Shortened as Returned Man (帰りマン, Kaeriman). This was even cited in the 1982 magazine Ultraman White Paper. This name is even acknowledged in episode 45 of Ultraman Mebius by the civilians upon his reappearance.

Starting from before the release of Ultraman Zoffy: Ultra Warriors vs. the Giant Monster Army, he received the name "Ultraman Jack" by then-president of Tsuburaya Productions Noboru Tsuburaya. As a result of this, later materials would continue to stick to this name, with "New Ultraman", "Ultraman II" and "Returned Ultraman" treated as aliases. As the humans in the Showa universe (including Mebius) had no awareness of his true name, they usually stick to the name "Ultraman" or "Returned Ultraman".

The 2008 movie Superior Ultraman 8 Brothers referenced this as an in-joke by a dimensional-displaced Mirai Hibino when he identified an alternate-dimension Hideki Go by the names Jack, New Man and Returned Man, all of which the latter reacted to in confusion.

Ultraman Jack was also the working title for Ultraman Taro and the eponymous character, until this was scrapped due to aircraft hijacking incidents at that time.

== History ==
Ultraman Jack is a member of the Inter-Galactic Defense Force (宇宙警備隊, Uchū Keibitai), whose arrival to Earth was made at the behest of Zoffy.

When aspiring race car driver Hideki Go was mortally wounded from saving a little boy and his dog, Jack was touched by his heroic deed and merged with the man to save his life, at the same time operating on Earth to face against recurring cases of monsters awakening from their slumber, as well as alien invaders. Despite suffering multiple defeats in the series, his connection to the human host Go would often resulting in the two training to improvise their fighting skills. After being defeated by a space monster named Bemstar, Jack was given the Ultra Bracelet by Ultraseven to further aid him in his battle. However, in several occasions, the alien invaders came to know the connection between Jack and his host and occasionally resulting in a physical attack on their loved ones. This includes the death of Aki and Ken Sakata by Alien Nackle, who would defeat the Ultra through the help of his monster, Black King. As Jack was brought to Planet Nackle, the original Ultraman and Seven rescued him as the former destroyed the invading Nackle space fleet. On Earth, Go managed to escape his brainwashed teammates and fought against the very leader of Alien Nackle and Black King; this time he managed to turn the tides of the battle.

In the final episode, Alien Bat, an originally benevolent race who betrayed the people of Land of Light, sent down a revived Zetton II on Earth, while his brethren tried to invade Jack's home world and held Jiro and Rumiko hostage. The original Ultraman tried to warn Jack not to transform, due to the former having been defeated by the same monster, with this one being an enhanced version of it. However, Go transformed anyway and this time the Ultra received help from his fellow MAT members, despite their means of fighting being reduced to handheld weapons. Jack first killed Alien Bat before using his newly created attack, the Ultra Hurricane, by throwing Zetton II up in the air and finishing it in mid-air with his Specium Ray. In the aftermath of the battle, Jack would leave Earth to join his kind in defending the Land of Light, while retaining his bond with Hideki Go.

=== Subsequent appearances in the Showa era ===
- Ultraman Ace (1972): Jack first appeared with the newly formed Ultra Brothers celebrating their newest member, Ace. His human host, Go, was impersonated by Alien Antira in episode 10 as a way to infiltrate TAC while unleashing the Terrible-Monster Zaigon into the city. In episodes 13 and 14, he was among those kidnapped and crucified by Yapool on Planet Golgoda and had his Ultra Bracelet stolen by Ace Killer, who made it part of his arsenal. When Ace was injured, the Brothers donated their energy to him, allowing Ace to defeat Ace Killer and free them. In episodes 26 and 27, Jack and the Ultra Brothers were among those turned into statues by Alien Hipporit before they were freed by Father of Ultra, who sacrificed his Color Timer to Ace in order to defeat the alien. Ironically, in this series the original Ultraman's suit was modified from Jack's suit during his title series.
- Ultraman Taro (1973): Jack appeared in episodes 1, 25, 33, 34, 40 and 52. In episode 1, he was among the Ultra Brothers that witnessed the fusion of Ultraman Taro and Kotaro and later help deliver the Ultra Bell to the Ultra Tower in episode 25. In 33 and 34, he and the rest of the Ultra Brothers joined Taro on Earth while fighting against Alien Temperor. In episode 40, he fought against Tyrant on Jupiter, only to be defeated after his attempt to send a warning signal through the Ultra Sign failed. Jack's final appearance was in episode 52, as he chased the monster Dorobon to Earth and had his Color Timer stolen, causing Jack to deflate in a manner of a balloon. That final appearance itself has Jack's suit portrayed with his gloves and boots being red in color, in contrast to the original silver.
- Ultraman Leo (1974): He first appeared in episode 34 to transport the Monster Ball Sevengar, but his journey was interrupted by Ashuran, who defeated Ultraman Jack and went to Earth. Jack reverted into Hideki Go and was left with a muzzle that muffled his speech. Although he managed to deliver Sevengar to Dan and freed him from his restrains, Go was still too injured to fight, but used the lunar eclipse to transform himself into Ultraman Jack, assisting Leo in defeating Ashuran before returning to Planet Ultra with Dan's Ultra Eye. In episodes 38 and 39, when Babarue posed as Imit-Astra to steal the Ultra Key, the Ultra Brothers were at war with the Leo Brothers on Earth, until King appeared and exposed the evil alien's deception. With Astra's name cleared, the Leo Brothers are invited to join the team. While Jirō Dan reprised his role in episode 34, Ultraman Jack is voiced by Takashi Takeuchi (竹内 喬, Takeuchi Takashi) in the two-part episode.
- The 6 Ultra Brothers vs. the Monster Army (1974 (Thailand)/1979 (Japan)):
- Ultraman Zoffy: Ultra Warriors vs. the Giant Monster Army (1984):
- Ultraman Story (1984): In this film, Ultraman Jack is voiced by Masayuki Omoro (小室 正幸, Omoro Masayuki), who also voiced 80 in the film.

=== Heisei era ===
- Ultraman Mebius & Ultraman Brothers (2006): In this movie, it was revealed that Ultraman, Ultraseven, Jack and Ace had sealed Yapool and his Super Beast U-Killersaurus beneath the lake of Kobe at the cost of most of their energy. Jack lived under his human host Hideki Go and became an instructor to the racing team in Kobe circuit in memory of his old friend Ken Sakata. He approached Mirai Hibino (the human form of Ultraman Mebius) alongside his comrades, giving him advice after being shaken due to being unable to save a young boy in the past. The human Ultra Brothers later witnessed Mebius' battle against an alien group that had arrived to revive Yapool. When Mebius was unable to handle the invaders, the Ultra Brothers had no choice but to transform again for the first time in 20 years. But even after Mebius was rescued, they quickly fell prey to the aliens' trap and were used to unseal Yapool before they could stop them. While fighting against Yapool/U-Killersaurus, Zoffy and Ultraman Taro came to their aid and replenished their energies. With the Ultra Brothers united, they combined with Mebius to form Mebius Infinity to defeat Yapool and freed Kobe.
- Ultraman Mebius (2006): Jack made his returning appearance in episode 45 and later on episode 50. When the second member of the Dark Four Heavenly Kings, Deslem, imprisoned the Crew GUYS' Phoenix Nest in a barrier, he threatened both Mebius and Jack with the consequences of dropping it from the sky if the two Ultras threatened him. As Deslem's plot caused the civilians to lose their trust on Crew GUYS and Mebius alike, Go approached Mirai during his mental dilemma and told him that to know humans means to accept their flaws. When Ryu managed to contact Mebius through radio communication and restore public opinion, Go transformed into Jack and intercepted Deslem's assault on Phoenix Nest before both Ultras finished the alien. In the final episode, Go communicated with George Ikaruga as Ultraman Jack joined the Ultra Brothers in cleansing the Sun from Aliem Empera's coating.
- Superior Ultraman 8 Brothers (2008): In this work, Ultraman Jack is an alternate universe character who came to Earth alongside his comrades Ultraman, Ultraseven and Ultraman Ace. Having arrived on Earth, they assumed the lives of mundane civilians, with Jack becoming Hideki Go and working at Sakata Motors (坂田モータース, Sakata Mōtāsu). (Note: In the Super Complete Works magazine, it is read as Sakata Auto Repair Shop.) Having lived on Earth for a long time, they had eventually forgotten their actual identities. This, however, changed when the safety of their Earth was threatened by unnamed dark figures. When their wives reminded them who they really were, allowing Go and the others to regain their memories and powers as Ultra Warriors, they assisted the alternate Heisei Ultra Warriors and Ultraman Mebius (the prime reality version which was forcefully brought into their universe) against their enemy. In the end, after Daigo completed the space vessel which was meant to bring its passengers to the Land of Light, Go and his comrades join along with their wives, as Go and Aki rode a space vessel that resembles the MAT's MAT Arrow. In this movie, Jack reused the same suit that appeared in Ultraman Mebius & Ultraman Brothers.
- Ultraman Mebius Side Story: Ghost Reverse (2009): Jack was among the Ultra Brothers that witness Ace and Taro's departure when intercepting Hikari's Ultra Sign.
- Mega Monster Battle: Ultra Galaxy (2009): As Ultraman Belial made his way to the Plasma Spark, Jack, Ace and 80 tried to stop him from advancing further, but were overpowered by the fallen Ultra's own strength and were frozen due to the Land of Light's deprivation of its light. He would soon be restored when Ultraman Zero returned the Plasma Spark and joined the rest of the Land of Light citizens in hearing Ultraman King's speech. In the English dub of the movie, Jack is voiced by Brad Potts. Jack's Ultra Lance, the weapon he used in the movie, was newly built and originally meant to appear in the Ghost Reverse side story.
- Ultraman Zero: The Revenge of Belial (2010): Jack was among the Space Garrison members that studied Darklops' remains and donated his light to Zero's travel sphere so that the youth could travel to an alternate universe. Brad Potts reprised his voice role as Jack in the movie's English dub.
- Ultraman Saga (2012): When Zero went to another alternate space to battle Alien Bat, Jack and the other Ultra Brothers sensed that Zero was in danger and worried about the youth. In the director's cut version of the movie, the Ultra Brothers arrived to assist Ultraman Saga in fighting against Hyper Zetton's revived monster army. Ultraman Jack fought against Black King, an old foe from his time on Earth.
- Ultraman Ginga (2013): Alongside the Ultra Brothers, Ultraman Jack was among the combatants of the Dark Spark War, but was soon turned into a Spark Doll by Dark Lugiel when he and the rest of the Space Garrison tried to protect Taro (thus making him the only Spark Doll to retain sentience in the series). In the aftermath of Ginga's battle with Lugiel, Ultraman Jack and the other Spark Dolls were lifted from their curse and returned to space.
- Ultraman Ginga S (2014): As revealed in episode 54 of Shin Ultraman Retsuden, Ultraman Jack and the rest of the Ultra Brothers donated their various powers to Taro when he raced to Earth after detecting a new threat. In Jack's case, he donated his Ultra Shot and Ultra Barrier, which soon became one of Ultraman Ginga Strium's powers. After his job on Earth ended, Taro returned the loaned powers back to all of the Ultra Brothers.
- Ultraman Orb (2016): Ultraman Jack was mentioned to be the sealer of Maga-Jappa in the Pacific Records before Jugglus released King Demon Beast. Upon its defeat, his Ultra Fusion Card was acquired by Gai, who used it alongside Ultraman Zero's card to transform into Ultraman Orb Hurricane Slash. During the final episode of the series, Jack and the other Ultra Fusion Cards in Gai's possession transformed into physical projections of their owner to assist Ultraman Orb in delivering the finishing blow to Magata no Orochi, while Juggler held off the monster long enough to expose its weak spot.
- Ultra Fight Orb (2017): Jack, Seven and Zoffy had sent Zero to investigate the mysterious darkness from Planet Yomi. Fearing that something happened to him, the three flew to the planet and saved him from four revived monsters. After Orb's failure in pursuing Reibatos, Zoffy and Jack tried to pursue Reibatos before Orb, Zero and Seven arrived. After Reibatos' death, he watched Orb leave the Land of Light.
- Ultraman Geed (2017): In the cold opening of episode 1, Jack was among the members of the Space Garrison that fought against Belial's reign of terror on Earth. After the evil Ultra detonated the entire universe and King merged with it to undo the damage, Jack's powers were contained in the Little Star of Toko Sakura, granting the little girl the ability to shoot a blade of light. This was later on harvested by Ultraman Geed, obtaining the Jack Capsule (ジャックカプセル, Jakku Kapuseru) and allowing him to execute the Lance Spark when assuming the form of the Royal Mega-Master.

=== Reiwa era ===
- Ultraman Taiga (2019): An unnamed Ultra Warrior had fought against Alien Nackle Odyssa in an unnamed planet from 50 years prior to the series. Through Oda's recollection in his fight with Taiga, the nameless Ultra Warrior bore a similar silhouette to Ultraman Jack. Although his brief appearance was a tribute to episode 37 of Return of Ultraman, his connection to Jack remains unknown.
- Ultra Galaxy Fight: New Generation Heroes (2019):
- Ultraman Z (2020): His power inhabited the Ultraman Jack Medal (ウルトラマンジャックメダル, Urutoraman Jakku Medaru), one of the many Ultra Medals developed by Hikari and eventually lost on Earth during Genegarg's theft and destruction. Jack was one of the sets that was salvaged by GAFJ until Barossa stole it via his King Joe. The alien dropped it from a skirmish battle against STORAGE members and was delivered to Ultraman Z by Yoko, allowing him to execute M78 Style Shining Tornado Slash (M78流・竜巻閃光斬, Emu Nana Hachi Ryu Tatsumaki Senkō Zan) alongside those of Zoffy and Father of Ultra.

== Profile ==
Ultraman Jack's statistics below were never mentioned in the original series, but were brought up in magazines and official websites:

- Height: 40 m
- Weight: 35,000 t
- Flight speed: Mach 5
- Birthplace: Nebula M78, Land of Light
- Year of debut: 1971
- First appearance: Return of Ultraman (1971–1972)
- Family structure:
  - Wife: Said to be the Mother of Ultra's younger sister
  - Nephew: Ultraman Taro
  - Adopted nephew: Ultraman Ace

=== Description ===
As the official website of Tsuburaya Productions stated: "In the event of monsters awakening from their slumber and alien invasions, he [Ultraman Jack] came from the Nebula M78, Land of Light. He utilizes the Ultra Bracelet that was bestowed by Ultraseven. His appearance on Earth is Hideki Go of the monster attack team MAT. He is also a member of the Ultra Brothers."

=== Transformation ===
In contrast to most Ultras, Hideki's transformation is based on his own willpower. In the initial episodes, Jack only transforms when Hideki was in danger of incoming disaster or the latter performing a jumping suicide. When transforming, both of his hands raised upwards and Ultraman Jack appeared as his rise scene was followed with reaching his fist towards the screen. In real time, a burst of light that resembled a cross-shaped construct appeared first before Jack appeared out of thin air. When he transformed by his free will, only his right hand was raised upwards. In the middle of the series, Hideki's transformation began to be made out of his free will.

In the original plan, Hideki was meant to use a transformation item and showing an enlargement process was even considered; both ideas were eventually rejected.

=== Powers and abilities ===
Since Jack was meant to be the original Ultraman returning, they shared the same Specium Ray (スペシウム光線, Supeshiumu Kōsen) and Ultra Slash (ウルトラスラッシュ, Urutora Surasshu). His own attacks are the Fog Beam (フォッグビーム, Foggu Bīmu), the Cinerama Shot (シネラマショット, Shinerama Shotto) and the Ultra Shot (ウルトラショット, Urutora Shotto), to name a few.

In episode 47, he briefly stole Red Killer's Razor Boomerangs (カミソリブーメラン, Kamisori Būmeran), allowing him to perform Ultra Cross Cutting (ウルトラ十文字斬り, Urutora Jūmonji Giri) on said monster.

=== Ultra Bracelet ===
The Ultra Bracelet (ウルトラブレスレット, Urutora Buresuretto) is a weapon delivered to Ultraman Jack in episode 18 by Ultraseven. It is normally worn on his left wrist and transforms into various items in accordance with his thoughts. In order to use it, Jack needed to fold his left hand to his chest and touch it with his right hand, transforming it into weapons or ready to be thrown as energy abilities. Unfortunately, the transformation ability can only be used once per transformation, as seen in episode 20. On certain occasions, it displayed unusual abilities, such as evaporating an entire lake, exploding a planet and using the Ultra Revival Power (ウルトラ再生パワー, Urutora Saisei Pawā; to reassemble his own dismembered body parts), among others.

Since the Ultra Bracelet was Jack's most powerful weapon, it had been hijacked twice: first by Alien Zelan in episode 31 and then by Ace Killer in episodes 13 and 14 of Ultraman Ace. As revealed in Mega Monster Battle: Ultra Galaxy, the Ultra Bracelet has become a standard weapon utilized by several residents of the Land of Light.

His known weapons are:

- Ultra Spark (ウルトラスパーク, Urutora Supāku): A hand-held knife which can be used as a throwing weapon in the same way as Seven's Eye Slugger. It was also in this form that the Ultra Bracelet first appeared before adapting to its current appearance. When used as a projectile, the Ultra Spark becomes an arrowhead-shaped energy construct to slice its opponent. When used against Billgamo, the Ultra Spark split into three copies at the same time. By extending its grip, it becomes either the Ultra Lance (ウルトラランス, Urutora Ransu) or the Ultra Cross (ウルトラクロス, Urutora Kurosu), the latter replacing the Ultra Spark with a Christian cross.
- Ultra Defender (ウルトラディフェンダー, Urutora Difendā): A shield that was used to reflect Snowgon's freezing gas.
- Bracelet Bomb (ブレスレットボム, Buresuretto Bomu): The bracelet acted as a time bomb by letting itself be devoured by the opponent.
- Strange Light Mirror (変光ミラー, Henkō Mirā): By throwing it into the sky, the bracelet turned into a mirror that utilized sunlight for cancelling an opponent's mirage powers.
- Bracelet Needle (ブレスレットニードル, Buresuretto Nīdoru): A large sewing needle used in a manner similar to a fencing rapier to tear apart Vacuumon from within and thus save the Cancer constellation.
- Bracelet Whip (ブレスレットムチ, Buresuretto Muchi): A whip that Jack used to catch Red Killer's boomerangs in mid-air and then use them as weapons against their owner.
- Barrier Ball (バリヤーボール, Bariyā Bōru): A ball that surrounds people to save them from falling from the sky to the ground.
- Bracelet Boomerang (ブレスレットブーメラン, Buresuretto Būmeran): A boomerang that was only used once against Black King and failed.

== Human hosts ==
=== Hideki Go ===
Hideki Go
- Ultra Series character
- Hideki Go circa 1971, as portrayed by Jiro Dan
- First appearance: Return of Ultraman (1971–1972)
- Created by: Tsuburaya Productions
- Portrayed by: Jirō Dan

Hideki Go (郷 秀樹, Gō Hideki) is the main protagonist of Return of Ultraman. Aged 23 years old, he worked in Sakata Auto Repair Shop (坂田自動車修理工場, Sakata Jidōsha Shūri Kōjō) and was aiming for the career of being a race car driver. His soon-to-be-finished car was the "Ryusei-gō" (流星号) designed by his employer/friend Ken Sakata. His main hobby is playing a guitar and his birthplace was stated in episode 31 to be Taitō, Asakusa.

Go lost his life from saving a young boy and his dog during Takkong's rampage. Inspired by his courage and sense of justice, Ultraman Jack bonded with Go to revive him, as he joined MAT as their sixth member with the determination to fight the enemies that threaten humanity's freedom and happiness.

Ever since his childhood, Go possess heightened senses which were amplified from his unity with Ultraman Jack, as well as allowing him to pass all tests conducted by MAT with ease, despite being a beginner. Unfortunately, due to his unnatural abilities, there were occasional moments of him at odds with the other MAT members. This was finally dropped in mid-season, since by that time he was able to understand others. As revealed in episode 3, Go lost his father at the age of 13 from a mountain climbing accident. His mother, on the other hand, had left from her hometown to a capital city, as Go's reason of winning the race in episode 1 was for his mother's sake. Episode 33 confirmed that she had died earlier before the series.

He usually view the Sakata family as his own, with Ken as an older brother, Aki being his lover and Jirō as a younger brother. During his period of vacation from MAT, Hideki would return to Ken's shop and building the second Ryusei-gō. He also had a childhood friend named Ichirō Mizuno, who lost his life in episode 34. When the elder siblings of the Sakata family were killed by Alien Nackle, Go started to live together with Jirō and became his surrogate older brother. Following Alien Bat and Zetton II's destruction, Hideki was forced to leave the Earth to help Planet Ultra counter Alien Bat's invasion forces. Go would teach Jirō the Five Ultra Oaths before leaving.

In an interesting case, Go never severed his bond with Ultraman Jack, as the two remained that way ever since. Because Go's relationship with Ultraman Jack is a secret to almost everyone except Jirō and Rumiko at the moment, he was believed by many to be dead during the attack against Zetton II, while MAT members arranged his private "funeral" before Jack's departure. His "death" was also documented in TAC's database in episode 10 of Ultraman Ace.

Hideki Go is portrayed by Jirō Dan (団 次郎, Dan Jirō). In a 1992 interview with Masaki Kyomoto, Jirō is well aware of how his corresponding Ultraman lacked a specific name, whereas others who succeeded Ultraseven did. Although Kyomoto pointed how he has the name "Jack", Jirō responded "Putting it (Jack's name) later on is something unavoidable, after all it doesn't come with a pin". Alongside Kurobe, Moritsugu and Takamine (actors from Ultraman to Ultraman Ace), Jirō is part of the four-man group the Dandy Four (ダンディー4, Dandī Fō) that are still well known to this day. During Kohji Moritsugu's Ultraseven CD song release in 1998, the Dandy Four were gathered for a discussion. Jirō and Moritsugu agreed that the original Ultraman would still remain popular to the children. The two still retain their friendship ever since the end of Return of Ultraman, wherein Moritsugu remarked that "Jirō often empties the liquor in the bottle" whenever the former visited his house. Additionally, Jirō stopped his drinking habit during his time acting in Return of Ultraman under Hajime Tsuburaya's suggestion in order to not ruining the children's dream. When asked which monster he liked the most, Jirō replied Twin Tail from episode 5 of Return of Ultraman.

=== Other hosts ===
In certain circumstances, Jack possesses other people as substitute human hosts.

- In episode 33 and 34 of Ultraman Taro, the Ultra Brothers possessed the male ZAT officers in order to hide themselves from Alien Temperor, who was hunting them on Earth, and to teach Kotaro Higashi/Ultraman Taro not to be arrogant and to not rely on his brothers-in-arms too much. Jack possessed the ZAT officer Tadao Nanbara (南原 忠男, Nanbara Tadao) and later a volleyball player once Temperor sees through their deception.

== Cultural impact ==
- Animator/director Hideaki Anno mentioned that Return of Ultraman is one of his five favorite tokusatsu shows. During his time as a college student in 1983, he directed a fan film titled Daicon Film's Return of Ultraman, which featured him as Ultraman Jack.
  - In the live action adaptation of Aoi Honō, which portrayed the lives of Kazuhiko Shimamoto and three other mangaka, one of his friends is, in fact, Hideaki himself. In episode 11, the group went to a local bathhouse, where Hideaki referenced that Ultraseven had once been portrayed by the suitmation actor Eiichi Kikuchi, who later went on to become Ultraman Jack.
- Jack's Ultra Lance appeared in episode 34 of Kishiryu Sentai Ryusoulger as an arrow launched by the elder to the Ryusoulgers. Said elder in question is portrayed by Jirō Dan, Hideki Go's actor.

== In other media ==
=== Anime and manga ===
- Ultraman Jack was one of the characters in the manga series Ultraman Chotoshi Gekiden. In the 1996 OVA, he is voiced by Shigeki Kagemaru (影丸 茂樹, Kagemaru Shigeki).
- In the 2011 manga Ultraman, Ultraman Jack was re-written as a seeming human named Jack (ジャック, Jakku), who served as an informant to Dan Moroboshi and the entire SSSP. In the Alien City, Jack gained the reputation as a boxer due to his incredible strength and skill and befriended an alien named Red, who was one of the contestants he defeated. His resemblance to his Ultraman namesake is notable on the bracelet he wears, it being similar to the Ultra Bracelet. As the SSSP made their move in America to intercept the Dark Star syndicate, Jack and Red would follow suit, the former trying to protect Rena Sayama from being caught in the same conflict. Jack was given a mass-produced Ultraman Suit Jack Suit (ジャックスーツ, Jakku Sūtsu) in America, which resembled the appearance of the original Ultraman Jack and assisting the other suit wearing "Ultras" in against Dark Star members. In the motion comic, Jack was voiced by Keiji Fujiwara (藤原 啓治, Fujiwara Keiji). The manga's anime adaptation on Netflix had him voiced by Ryota Takeuchi in Japanese and Robbie Daymond in the English dubbing.

== Reception ==
Eiichi Kikuchi's role as Ultraman Jack started due to the wish of Tsuburaya Productions. He originally refused the role due to his experience as Seven's suit actor and recommended Shintarō Nakaoka (中岡 慎太郎, Nakaoka Shintarō) of JFA (Japan Fighting Action); however, as Jiro Dan won the audition as Hideki Go, the production crew was forced to ask Kikuchi to take the offer again since Nakaoka's physique was too different from Dan. Wanting to silently refuse the role, he presented the conditions of "having a 1.5 increase of salary than the one preferred to Nakaoka" and "requesting a physical appearance as one of the MAT members". Although the team had no problem with accepting his first condition, the second one could not be fulfilled since all roles and positions of the MAT members were fulfilled at the moment, but said team promised to consider another live appearance. In the end, he was able to accept it. Although Kikuchi did have minor live roles in the series, he felt that the role of Ultraman alone was enough for him.

At some point during the recording of Return of Ultraman, there was one occasion where he felt that he was not fit for the role of Ultraman, but was encouraged otherwise by Takamitsu Watanabe's wife, who saw the expression of an Ultraman in him. He also received fan letters from the children, who usually addressed him as "Mr. Returned Ultraman from Setagaya of Tokyo" (東京都世田谷区帰ってきたウルトラマン様, Tōkyōto Setagayaku Kaettekita Urutoraman-sama). During the waiting for the filming of the special effects in episode 2, there was an electricity discharge accident at the pool he was in and Kikuchi was almost electrocuted to death.

During his days of acting in Return of Ultraman, Kikuchi ate garlic soy sauce and candied lemon on a daily basis to gain stamina. There was also at one point when his stomach ached from eating too much garlic. He also ate a lot of fresh vegetables sprinkled with salt, due to being constantly sweating from wearing Ultraman's wet suit costume. Although Kikuchi doubted that this kind of practice would bring harm to his health, he kept doing it regularly. Ironically, after Return of Ultraman ended, a local doctor said that his body was diagnosed with a lack of salt.

As filming of Ultraman Ace began, Kikuchi refused the role of Ultraman Ace due to the fact that his body had reached its limit. Once Return of Ultraman finished its filming, Kikuchi was allowed to keep several of the show's props as memorabilia, including the original Ultra Bracelet. In the May 7, 2002 broadcast of Kaiun! Nandemo kanteidan (開運!なんでも鑑定団), Kikuchi revealed that all the memorabilia of Ultraman Jack that he kept were worth about 2,110,000 yen. (Note: The following items were according to Japanese yen: 1 million for the doll, 800,000 for the mask, 200,000 for the Ultra Bracelet, 100,000 for the Color Timer and 10,000 for the gloves.)

=== Popularity ===
In 2006, a character popularity poll was launched in response to the 40th anniversary of the Ultra Series. Based on Oricon's list, Jack was placed fifth in the list according to the total of voters. He was ranked ninth by female voters and fifth by male voters. Five years later for the Ultra Series' 45th anniversary, Jack was placed 13th and ranked 15th in 2013.

In July 2016, Ultraman Jack was sighted multiple times within the vicinity of Meguro Station in Japan. He was shown multiple times walking with a book bag and riding the train. His presence became a topic by Internet users, including the fact that in the train, someone joked that "they would allow Jack to go home if he opened his mask".

=== Merchandise ===
In 2013, Jack was sold as the Ultra-Act articulated figure and came with the Ultra Lance and Ultra Defender weapons that were transformed from his Ultra Bracelet. About five years later, he was sold as an S.H. Figuarts figure alongside the Ultra Lance/Cross parts and firing effects for the Specium Ray and the Ultra Slash.
