= Ultraman The Prime =

- Title card
- Also known as: Ultraman The Prime: Heisei Ultras Combat Chapter
- Created by: Tsuburaya Productions
- Presented by: Daikichi Hakata; Hiroyuki Deguchi
- Country of origin: Japan
- No. of episodes: 20

Production
- Running time: 30-40 min. (per episode)

Original release
- Network: Amazon Video
- Release: April 5 – August 16, 2017

Related
- Ultraman Zero: The Chronicle; Ultraman Orb: The Chronicle

Ultraman The Prime: Heisei Ultras Combat Chapter (ウルトラマン ザ・プライム～平成ウルトラ激闘編～, Urutoraman Za Puraimu ~Heisei Urutora Gekitōhen~) is a 2017 Japanese variety show held by Tsuburaya Productions. The series is available every Wednesday under the pay-per-view service Amazon Video, succeeding Ultraman Orb: The Origin Saga.

== Format ==
The series features the presenters, a Japanese comedian Daikichi Hakata and Monobright bassist Hiroyuki Deguchi, both are fans of Tokusatsu as they review the past Heisei Era Ultra Series. The reviewed series are Ultraman Tiga to Mebius (except Neos), with spin-offs and movie adaptations also included.

Other than that, it features guest appearances of Ultra Warriors and past actors of Ultra Series.

== Ultras ==
- Ultraman Tiga
- Ultraman Mebius
- Ultraman Dyna
- Ultraman Gaia
- Ultraman Agul
- Ultraman Cosmos
- Ultraman Justice
- Ultraman Nexus
- Ultraman Max
- Ultraman Hikari

== Episodes ==
1. Heisei Ultraman Introduction (平成ウルトラマン概論, Heisei Urutoraman Gairon) (Note: This episode's runtime is 48 minutes. Succeeding episodes would last averagely 30-40 minutes.)
2. Introduction to Ultraman Tiga (ウルトラマンティガ入門, Urutoraman Tiga Nyūmon)
3. Ultraman Tiga: Revival of the Ancient Giant Part 1 (ウルトラマンティガ外伝 古代に蘇る巨人 前編, Urutoraman Tiga Gaiden Kodai ni Yomigaeru Kyojin Zenpen)
4. Ultraman Tiga: Revival of the Ancient Giant Part 2 (ウルトラマンティガ外伝 古代に蘇る巨人 後編, Urutoraman Tiga Gaiden Kodai ni Yomigaeru Kyojin Kōhen)
5. Introduction to Ultraman Dyna (ウルトラマンダイナ入門, Urutoraman Daina Nyūmon)
6. Ultraman Dyna Select: Ep. 31 Dyna vs. Dyna (ウルトラマンダイナ・セレクト 『第31話 ダイナVSダイナ』, Urutoraman Daina Serekuto Dai Sanjūichi-wa Daina Tai Daina)
7. Ultraman Dyna Select: Ep. 20 Alien Boy (ウルトラマンダイナ・セレクト『第20話 少年宇宙人』, Urutoraman Daina Serekuto Dai Nijū-wa Shōnen Uchūjin")
8. Ultraman Dyna Select: Ep. 35 The Smile of Destruction Part 1 (ウルトラマンダイナ・セレクト『第35話 滅びの微笑（前編）』, Urutoraman Daina Serekuto Dai Sanjūgo-wa Horobi no Bishō (Zenpen)")
9. Ultraman Dyna Select: Ep. 35 The Smile of Destruction Part 2 (ウルトラマンダイナ・セレクト『第35話 滅びの微笑（後編）』, Urutoraman Daina Serekuto Dai Sanjūgo-wa Horobi no Bishō (Kōhen)")
10. Introduction to Ultraman Gaia (ウルトラマンガイア入門, Urutoraman Gaia Nyūmon)
11. Ultraman Gaia: Gaia Again Part 1 (ウルトラマンガイア外伝 『ガイアよ再び』前編, Urutoraman Gaia Gaiden Gaia yo Futatabi Zenpen)
12. Ultraman Gaia: Gaia Again Part 2 (ウルトラマンガイア外伝 『ガイアよ再び』後編, Urutoraman Gaia Gaiden Gaia yo Futatabi Kōhen)
13. Introduction to Ultraman Cosmos: Television Series Part (ウルトラマンコスモス入門 テレビシリーズ編, Urutoraman Kosumosu Nyūmon Terebi Shirīzu-hen)
14. Introduction to Ultraman Cosmos: Movie Series Part (ウルトラマンコスモス入門 映画シリーズ編, Urutoraman Kosumosu Nyūmon Eiga Shirīzu-hen)
15. Introduction to Ultraman Nexus (ウルトラマンネクサス入門, Urutoraman Nekusasu Nyūmon)
16. Introduction to Ultraman Max & Ultraman Mebius (ウルトラマンマックス＆メビウス入門, Urutoraman Makkusu Ando Urutoraman Mebiusu Nyūmon)
17. Ultraman Mebius Side Story: Armored Darkness: Stage 1 The Legacy of Destruction (ウルトラマンメビウス外伝 アーマードダークネス STAGE1 滅びの遺産, Urutoraman Mebiusu Gaiden Āmādo Dākunesu Sutēji Wan Horobi no Isan)
18. Ultraman Mebius Side Story: Armored Darkness: Stage 2 The Immortal Wicked Armor (ウルトラマンメビウス外伝 アーマードダークネス STAGE2 不滅の魔鎧装, Urutoraman Mebiusu Gaiden Āmādo Dākunesu Sutēji Tsū Fumetsu no Ma Gaisō)
19. Ultraman Mebius Side Story: Ghost Reverse: Stage I The Dark Graveyard (ウルトラマンメビウス外伝 ゴーストリバース STAGE I 暗黒の墓場, Urutoraman Mebiusu Gaiden Gōsuto Ribāsu Sutēji Wan Ankoku no Hakaba)
20. Ultraman Mebius Side Story: Ghost Reverse: Stage II The Emperor's Resurrection (ウルトラマンメビウス外伝 ゴーストリバース STAGE II 復活の皇帝, Urutoraman Mebiusu Gaiden Gōsuto Ribāsu Sutēji Tsū Fukkatsu no Kōtei)

== Cast ==
- Daikichi Hakata (博多 大吉, Hakata Daikichi)
- Hiroyuki Deguchi (出口 博之, Deguchi Hiroyuki, of Monobright)

=== Guests ===
- Takeshi Tsuruno (つるの 剛士, Tsuruno Takeshi, 5-9)
- Taiyo Sugiura (杉浦 太陽, Sugiura Taiyō, 13, 14)
