= Superior Ultraman 8 Brothers =

Superior 8 Ultra Brothers
- Theatrical release poster
- Directed by: Takeshi Yagi
- Written by: Keiichi Hasegawa
- Produced by: Kiyoshi Suzuki
- Starring: Hiroshi Nagano; Susumu Kurobe; Kohji Moritsugu; Jiro Dan; Keiji Takamine; Takeshi Tsuruno; Takeshi Yoshioka; Shunji Igarashi
- Cinematography: So Takahashi
- Edited by: Akira Matsuki
- Music by: Toshihiko Sahashi
- Production company: Tsuburaya Productions
- Distributed by: Shochiku
- Release date: September 13, 2008
- Running time: 97 minutes
- Country: Japan
- Language: Japanese

Superior 8 Ultra Brothers (大決戦！超ウルトラ８兄弟, Daikessen! Chō Urutora Hachi Kyōdai; lit. "Great Decisive Battle! The Super 8 Ultra Brothers") is a 2008 Japanese superhero kaiju film directed by Takeshi Yagi. It unites the Shōwa heroes Ultraman, Seven, Jack and Ace together on screen with the Heisei heroes Tiga, Dyna, Gaia and Mebius. The catchphrase for the movie is "I will protect the world." (この世界を、僕が守る, Kono sekai o, boku ga mamoru).

The movie was released theatrically nationwide in Japan on September 13, 2008. As of October 23, 2008, the movie had grossed over ¥800,000,000 (US$8,000,000) at the box office, becoming the most commercially successful movie in the history of the Ultraman franchise, until it was surpassed by the 2022 film Shin Ultraman.

== Plot ==
On July 17, 1966, best friends Daigo Madoka, Shin Asuka, and Gamu Takayama watch the first broadcast of Ultraman television series at Daigo's house, and are inspired to grow up and do great things. While playing softball, the boys meet a strange young girl whom they invite to join them. They begin discussing their dreams and aspirations; Asuka wishes to become a professional baseball player, Daigo wishes to be astronaut and pilot a spaceship to Ultraman's homeworld, and Gamu a scientist to build Daigo's ship. The strange girl never reveals her wish, instead bidding Daigo farewell and disappearing.

30 years later, the three have forgotten their child passion for Ultraman and dreams while continuing their lives as normal civilians. Daigo hurriedly cycles to work after awaken late. Daigo arrives late for work, only to see his workers stunned by a strange mirage over Yokohama. Daigo experiences a vision of a destroyed city, swarming with Kaiju, and a group of eight Ultramen fending them off. Alien Nackle, a villain from The Return of Ultraman, announces that Ultraman Mebius has been captured and that he and the Alien Guts, an antagonistic race of aliens from Ultra Seven, will destroy the Earth.

The vision concludes as elderly four men whom he'd passed on his commute; Shin Hayata, Dan Moroboshi, Hideki Go, and Seiji Hokuto, transform into Ultramen. After the mirage vanishes, Daigo is approached on the boardwalk by Hayata's daughter Rena, and they realize that the image in the mirage resembles the destroyed Yokohama from Daigo's vision. While talking with Shina and Gamu, Daigo realizes that the four men from his vision share their names with the characters of the original four Ultras (Ultraman, Ultraseven, Ultraman Jack, and Ultraman Ace) from their childhood. The next day, Daigo experiences another vision, this time of a battle between Mebius and U-Killersaurus Neo.

A strange man appears, claiming to know Daigo and be his supporter. Daigo proposes the possibility to his friends that he is catching glimpses of a parallel universe, one in which he and the people he knows are the Ultramen they knew and loved. They laugh him off, while Daigo sees the strange girl from his childhood briefly appear and then disappear. A man in a dark robe suddenly appears and sends a truck careening toward a group of passing children. Hayata, Dan, Go, and Hokoto spring into action and stop the truck with amazing speed, while the man in the robe laughs and vanishes.

Working as a tour guide, Daigo leads a group to the Red Brick Warehouse, but experiences another vision in which he sees King Guesra, a Kaiju who appeared in a Ultraman episode, rise from the sea and destroy a building. Mebius intervenes however, but is quickly overpowered by Guesra. Remembering the battle from the original episode, Daigo shouts at Mebius to strike his weakpoint at the fins. Mebius finishes Guesra off with Daigo's advice. He reverts to his human form, Mirai Hibino, and approaches Daigo to thank him, but they suddenly revert to the real world, only now Mirai is among them. Both are shocked and confused, with Mirai unable to explain how he got there, and flabbergasted that Ultramen and kaijus are only fictional characters in this world. He tells Daigo that while on patrol in Yokohama, he encountered a girl with red shoes, who told him to awaken seven warriors and stop the destruction of a world in which Ultramen never existed.

Mirai tries to approach Hayata, Moroboshi, Go, and Hokuto, but they don't recognize him and report him for harassment. However, King Pandon arrives via a tornado and begins a rampage. Mirai surmises that someone is summoning Kaijus from his world to Daigo's. He transforms into Mebius and fights Pandon. The whole city falls into chaos as the fight goes on: Asuka and Ryo heads toward shelter from the baseball stadium and Gamu and Atsuko evacuate citizens from a museum. Within the city, Go's wife Aki, helps an elderly man amidst the chaos. However, one of Pandon's attacks blasts a building and sends debris to fall on the two of them. Enraged, Mebius thrown Pandon aside and finishes the beast via Lightning Thrasher and Mebius Shoot. As Mebius gives Daigo a thumb up, Mebius finds himself in a cylinder and frozen into a bronze statue by Alien Hipporit who also announces his intention to destroy humanity, before disappearing

At the hospital, Daigo finds Rena, who tell him that Go's wife remains critically injured and unconscious due to Pandon's attack. Blaming himself, Go falls into a depression. Daigo pleads with the frozen Mebius to help him summon the seven warriors, but to no avail. He then sees the mysterious girl, and realizes she's the same one who approached Mirai. The girl tells Daigo that without the hopes and dreams of his fans, Ultraman cannot exist. Daigo tries to convince Asuka and Gamu to believe remember their childhood dreams of becoming Ultramen, but to no success. Rena tells Daigo she believes in him, but he brushes her off, telling her that he stayed behind in Yokohama for her.

The next day, King Silvergon and King Goldras emerge and begin a rampage. Gamu and Asuka wander to an ocean liner and baseball stadium respectively and muse over their lost childhood dreams. Their respective co-workers try to comfort them, and Gamu that he couldn't accept the responsibilities of becoming a scientist, while Asuka remembers that his ambitions of becoming a baseball player where he shattered when he missed a key play and lost his team their match. He was demoted to ball boy, but continued to persist in the hopes of getting another chance. Rena races to her boss at a radio station and begs him to let her make a special broadcast. The JSDF send out a squadron of F-22 Raptor fighter jets to combat the Kaijus, but they are easily fought off. Rena makes a broadcast over the radio that they should not give up and to believe in their dreams before it's too late.

All of the city hears the broadcast and Daigo, Asuka, and Gamu are inspired. They're approached by Hayata, Dan, and Hakuto. The three men remind Daigo a phrase that he once told them: "As long we don't give up, Ultraman will surely come". This triggers a vision which reveals the little girl's wish: For Daigo and his friends to become Ultramen and save the Earth. A light surrounds Daigo, giving him the Sparklence as he realizes that he is the seventh hero and transforms into Ultraman Tiga. The crowd watches him as Tiga fights the Kaijus while Gamu and Asuka watch. Hipporit traps Tiga in his cylinder to turn him into a statue, but Asuka and Gamu in turn transform into Ultraman Dyna and Ultraman Gaia. With support from the cheering populace, they free Tiga from the cylinder and he destroys the Kaijus with his Zeperion Beam.

However, the same mysterious cloaked beings use their powers to resurrect the five Kaijus and forming the gigantic Giga Chimaira. Tiga, Dyna, and Gaia can barely hold them off, and Dan declares that anyone who believes in Ultraman can achieve victory. Dan and Hayata's wives Anne and Fuji appear, and remembering their other lives as Ultramen, transform and free Mebius. Giga Chimaira tries to flee Earth, but the Ultramen use their combined powers to destroy him once and for all. The cloaked beings declare their intention to destroy all Ultramen in all universes, but are defeated by the Ultras. As they revert to their human forms, Go is informed that his wife has recovered from her injuries. Mirai bids farewell and returns to his universe, vowing to see them again in another time and place.

Years later, Asuka has become a pro baseball player, commended by team captain Gosuke Hibiki as his finest player. Meanwhile, Gamu has become a popular and successful scientist, who has developed an anti-gravity mechanism. Daigo has finally achieved his lifelong dream of becoming an astronaut and has married Rena. While playing, their daughter Hikari meets the girl with the red shoes.

Sometime later, the 150-year-old ship monument had turned into a spaceship where everyone makes their way to M78. Daigo is commended by the Chief of United Nations, Sawai for a good job. As the ship blasts off, the crowd cheers as it were followed by four jets which aboarded by the elders. As they exit the Earth atmosphere, Daigo commends that it's time to reach M78 and by doing so, all ships activate the hyperjump sequences.

== Cast ==
- Daigo Madoka/Ultraman Tiga (Voice) (マドカ・ダイゴ／ウルトラマンティガ（声）, Madoka Daigo/Urutoraman Tiga (Koe)): Hiroshi Nagano (V6) (長野 博（Ｖ６）, Nagano Hiroshi (Bui Shikkusu))
- Shin Asuka/Ultraman Dyna (Voice) (アスカ・シン／ウルトラマンダイナ（声）, Asuka Shin/Urutoraman Daina (Koe)): Takeshi Tsuruno (つるの 剛士, Tsuruno Takeshi)
- Gamu Takayama/Ultraman Gaia (V2) (Voice) (高山 我夢／ウルトラマンガイア（声）, Takayama Gamu/Urutoraman Gaia (Koe)): Takeshi Yoshioka (吉岡 毅志, Yoshioka Takeshi)
- Mirai Hibino/Ultraman Mebius (Voice) (ヒビノ・ミライ／ウルトラマンメビウス（声）, Hibino Mirai/Urutoraman Mebiusu (Koe)): Shunji Igarashi (五十嵐 隼士, Igarashi Shunji)
- Shin Hayata/Ultraman (Voice) (ハヤタ／ウルトラマン（声）, Hayata Shin/Urutoraman (Koe)): Susumu Kurobe (黒部 進, Kurobe Susumu)
- Dan Moroboshi/Ultra Seven (Voice) (モロボシ・ダン／ウルトラセブン（声）, Moroboshi Dan/Urutorasebun (Koe)): Kohji Moritsugu (森次 晃嗣, Moritsugu Kōji)
- Hideki Go/Ultraman Jack (Voice) (郷 秀樹／ウルトラマンジャック（声）, Gō Hideki/Urutoraman Jakku (koe)): Jiro Dan (団 時郎, Dan Jirō)
- Seiji Hokuto/Ultraman Ace (Voice) (北斗 星司／ウルトラマンエース（声）, Hokuto Seiji/Urutoraman Ēsu (Koe)): Keiji Takamine (高峰 圭二, Takamine Keiji)
- Rena (レナ): Takami Yoshimoto (吉本 多香美, Yoshimoto Takami)
- Hikari (ヒカリ, Hikari): Kurumi Hashimoto (橋本 くるみ, Hashimoto Kurumi)
- Ryo Yumimura (ユミムラ・リョウ, Yumimura Ryō): Risa Saito (斉藤 りさ, Saitō Risa)
- Atsuko Sasaki (佐々木 敦子, Sasaki Atsuko): Ai Hashimoto (橋本 愛, Hashimoto Ai)
- Akiko (アキコ, Akiko)/Akiko Fuji (flashback scenes): Hiroko Sakurai (桜井 浩子, Sakurai Hiroko)
- Anne (アンヌ, Annu)/Anne Yuri (flashback scenes): Yuriko Hishimi (ひし美 ゆり子, Hishimi Yuriko)
- Aki (アキ, Aki)/Akiko "Aki" Sakata (flashback scenes): Rumi Sakakibara (榊原 るみ, Sakakibara Rumi)
- Megu (メグ, Megu): Megumi Matsushita (松下 恵, Matsushita Megumi)
- Yuko (夕子, Yūko)/Yuko Minami (flashback scenes): Mitsuko Hoshi (星 光子, Hoshi Mitsuko)
- Nanami (七海, Nanami): Shiko (紫子, Shiko)
- Hiroya Fujimiya (藤宮 博也, Fujimiya Hiroya): Hassei Takano (高野 八誠, Takano Hassei)
- Reiko Fujimiya (藤宮 玲子, Fujimiya Reiko): Yukari Ishida (石田 裕加里, Ishida Yukari)
- Fujimiya's Child (藤宮の子供, Fujimiya no Kodomo): Hinaka (妃菜花, Hinaka)
- Girl with Red Shoes (赤い靴の少女, Akai Kutsu no Shōjo): Momoka Iizuka (飯塚 百花, Iizuka Momoka)
- Hanejiro (Voice) (ハネジロー（声）, Hanejirō (Koe))
- Super Alien Hipporit (Voice) (スーパーヒッポリト星人（声）, Sūpā Hipporito Seijin (Koe)): Ryūzaburō Ōtomo (大友 龍三郎, Ōtomo Ryūzaburō)
- Black Kageboshi (黒い影法師, Kuroi Kagebōshi): Shihei Saga (嵯峨 周平, Saga Shūhei)
- Owner of Cheep Candy Shop (駄菓子屋の主人, Dagashiya no Shujin): Masanari Nihei (二瓶 正也, Nihei Masanari; Cameo)
- Daigo's Mother (ダイゴの母, Daigo no Haha): Nao Nagasawa (長澤 奈央, Nagasawa Nao; Cameo)
- Daigo's Father (ダイゴの父, Daigo no Chichi): Kazuhiko Ando (安藤 一人, Andō Kazuhito; Cameo)
- Head of Tourism Division Munakata (観光課長 ムナカタ, Kankō Kachō Munakata): Akitoshi Otaki (大滝 明利, Ōtaki Akitoshi; Cameo)
- Director of FM Yokohama Shinjo (FMヨコハマディレクター シンジョウ, Efu Emu Yokohama Direkutā Shinjō): Shigeki Kagemaru (影丸 茂樹, Kagemaru Shigeki; Cameo)
- TV M.C. Shinjo (テレビ司会者 シンジョウ, Terebi Shikaisha Shinjō): Kei Ishibashi (石橋 けい, Ishibashi Kei; Cameo)
- TV Caster (テレビキャスター, Terebi Casutā): Yoko Azami (莇 陽子, Azami Yōko; Cameo)
- Idol of Ceremonial First Pitch (始球式のアイドル, Shikyūshiki no Aidoru): Anri Ban (伴 杏里, Ban Anri; Cameo)
- Old Man in Shopping Mall (ショッピングモールの老人, Shoppingu Mōru no Rōjin): Yasuhiko Saijo (西條 康彦, Saijō Yasuhiko; Cameo)
- Citizens (市民, Shimin): Jo Onodera (小野寺 丈, Onodera Jō; Cameo), Takao Kase (加瀬 尊朗, Kase Takao; Cameo), Shinobu Kameyama (亀山 忍, Kameyama Shinobu; Cameo)
- Jun Manjome (万城目 淳, Manjōme Jun): Kenji Sahara (佐原 健二, Sahara Kenji; Cameo)
- Manager Hibiki (ヒビキ監督, Hibiki Kantoku): Ryo Kinomoto (木之元 亮, Kinomoto Ryō; Cameo)
- Dr. Kido (キド医師, Kido Ishi): Shingo Kazami (風見 しんご, Kazami Shingo; Cameo)
- Secretary-General of the United Nations Sawai (サワイ国連事務総長, Sawai Kokuren Jimu Sōchō): Tamio Kawachi (川地 民夫, Kawachi Tamio; Cameo)
- Narrator (ナレーター, Narētā): Koji Ishizaka (石坂 浩二, Ishizaka Kōji; Cameo)
- The Manager of the Baseball Club of Yokohama North High School (横浜北高校野球部監督, Yokohama Kita Kōkō Yakyūbu Kantoku): Makoto Inagawa (稲川 誠, Inagawa Makoto; Special Guest)
- The President of Yokohama BayStars (横浜ベイスターズ球団社長, Yokohama Beisutāzu Kyūdan Shachō): Kuniaki Sasaki (佐々木 邦昭, Sasaki Kuniaki; Special Guest)
- The Mayor of Yokohama (横浜市長, Yokohama Shichō): Hiroshi Nakada (中田 宏, Nakada Hiroshi; Special Guest)

=== Suit actors ===
- Ultraman Tiga, Ultraman Mebius: Hideyoshi Iwata (岩田 栄慶, Iwata Hideyoshi)
- Ultraman Dyna: Daisuke Fukuda (福田 大助, Fukuda Daisuke)
- Ultraman Gaia: Tatsunari Fukushima (福島 龍成, Fukushima Tatsunari), Daisuke Terai (寺井 大介, Terai Daisuke)
- Ultraman Mebius: Sanshiro Wada (和田 三四郎, Wada Sanshirō)
- Ultraman: Kenya Soma (相馬 絢也, Sōma Kenya)
- Ultra Seven, King Silvergon: Satoshi Yamamoto (山本 諭, Yamamoto Satoshi)
- Ultraman Jack, King Pandon: Shinya Iwasaki (岩崎 晋弥, Iwasaki Shinya)
- Ultraman Ace: Koji Maruyama (丸山 貢治, Maruyama Kōji)
- King Gesura: Kazunori Yokoo (横尾 和則, Yokoo Kazunori)
- King Goldras: Ryo Nishimura (西村 郎, Nishimura Ryō)
- Super Alien Hipporit: Hiroshi Suenaga (末永 博志, Suenaga Hiroshi)

== Staff ==
- Director / Director of Special FX: Takeshi Yagi
- Producer: Kiyoshi Suzuki
- Writer: Keiichi Hasegawa

== Songs ==
Theme song

- "LIGHT IN YOUR HEART"
  - Lyrics: KOMU
  - Composition: Yusuke Kato
  - Artist: V6

== Public service announcement ==
A short PSA about Ultraman sees the 8 Ultra Brothers alerting Super Alien Hipporit to turn his phone off. This indicates that people must not operate phones in cinemas.

== Home media ==
The movie was released on both DVD and Blu-ray on January 23, 2009. It was the first production in the Ultraman series to be released on the Blu-ray format. The standard DVD and Blu-ray releases carried the same content and features. A limited edition 2-disc "Memorial Box" DVD collection also included extra bonus features, 3D glasses for a special 3D featurette and replica copies of the storyboards and director Yagi's screenplay., Mill Creek Entertainment released the movie on Blu-ray, with English subtitles, in the USA on April 5, 2022.
