= Ultraman Mebius Side Story: Armored Darkness =

- DVD cover for STAGE I
- Directed by: Tomoki Sano
- Written by: Masanao Akahoshi
- Produced by: Hiroyasu Shibuya; Satoshi Kawano
- Starring: Shunji Igarashi; Makoto Miyoshi; Masaki Nishina; Ai Saikawa; Daisuke Watanabe; Kenta Uchino; Misato Hirata; Minoru Tanaka
- Production company: Tsuburaya Productions
- Distributed by: Bandai Visual
- Release dates: July 25, 2008 (STAGE I); August 22, 2008 (STAGE II)
- Running time: 25 minutes per episodes
- Country: Japan
- Language: Japanese

Ultraman Mebius Side Story: Armored Darkness (ウルトラマンメビウス外伝 アーマードダークネス, Urutoraman Mebiusu Gaiden Āmādo Dākunesu) is a Japanese direct-to-video, serving as the sequel of 2006 Ultra Series Ultraman Mebius, taking place sometime after the final episode. Aside from original video work, it also received an expansion in the Televi-kun and Televi-Magazine publications in 2008. The series was released separately, The Legacy of Destruction (滅びの遺産, Horobi no Isan) July 25 and The Immortal Wicked Armor (不滅の魔鎧装, Fumetsu no Ma Gaisō) on August 22, 2008.

== Plot ==
=== STAGE I: The Legacy of Destruction ===
Sometime after Alien Empera's destruction and Mebius' departure, Ryu was promoted into GUYS captain, leading a bunch of rookies whereas the older members had retired. After recently destroying a Salamandora, the group separated to fight three different monsters, Roberuga, Mukamender and Kelbim. Not long after destroying Mukamender, Ryu and Haruzaki's ship were sucked into a strange fireball that brought them into a pocket dimension, which was revealed to be none other than the late Empera's ship, Darkness Fear. Alien Empera rode it as his transportation to Earth and was abandoned upon his arrival. But somehow, it was reactivated, and causing the series of monster appearances in the past month. With the Earth's safety at stake from its impact, the Darkness Fear could only be stopped from within. With no other choices, Sakomizu tried to participate in the mission until Toriyama stopped him, leaving this mission to the older Crew GUYS that he had just assembled.

Ryu's ship was struck with a trident, which was revealed to be the work of a samurai-themed monster. After he seemingly killed Ryu, the giant tied to chase Haruzaki until he was stopped by Ultraman Mebius. Mebius engaged in a battle against the armor but found himself slowly weakened. The armored giant fired Empera's Rezolium Ray, leading Haruzaki to theorize that the monster was Alien Empera. As the giant armor was about to finish Mebius, it was stopped by a sudden wave, which was revealed to have been caused by Ultraman Hikari. Having been trapped within the armor, he was only able to paralyze the fiend long enough for Mebius to take his sword and deliver a single blow before it was petrified. Out of exhaustion, he assumed his human form Mirai and met a guilt-ridden Haruzaki, believing that Ryu was killed due to his mistake.

=== STAGE II: The Immortal Wicked Armor ===
While both Kelbim and Roberuga were being dealt with, Mirai revealed to Haruzaki that Ryu survived the explosion. Ryu was briefly met by Ultraman King, later Hikari, who revealed that the giant armor's name was Armored Darkness, one of the Empera's vanguards. After his master's death, the sentient armor took control of Darkness Fear. Hikari tried to stop him but was consumed by the armor and can only paralyze it for short periods of time. The only way to rescue Hikari was for Ryu to make contact with the Ultraman. Ryu approached Mirai and Haruzaki, with the party reuniting with the older GUYS members. Once Armored Darkness began to move again, GUYS and Ultraman Mebius made their move, holding off the giant armor long enough for Ryu to enter the crack in his helmet and merge with Hikari. Hikari reawakened and burst out but Armored Darkness reformed and the Darkness Fear was about to approach the Earth. With the only way to stop it was to defeat the giant armor, both Ultra Warriors engaged in the fight but none of their attacks succeeded.

The older members of GUYS resonated with the Ultra Warriors, and the humans and Ultras merged, bringing forth Ultraman Mebius Phoenix Brave, who proceed to attack Armored Darkness with his own sword. After leaving a large slash on it, the combined Ultraman launch his attack and finally defeated the Armored Darkness but Darkness Fear descended faster than before. Hikari decided to bring the Darkness Fear to the Land of Light in hopes of safely disposing it, while Mebius teleported himself and the rest of Crew GUYS to safety. Mirai saw the Ultra Sign, saying that he was allowed to stay on Earth for a little longer, much to his friend's amusement.

== Cast ==
- Mirai Hibino (ヒビノ・ミライ, Hibino Mirai) - Shunji Igarashi (五十嵐 隼士, Igarashi Shunji)
- Ryu Aihara (アイハラ・リュウ, Aihara Ryū) - Masaki Nishina (仁科 克基, Nishina Masaki)
- Kanata Haruzaki (ハルザキ・カナタ, Haruzaki Kanata) - Makoto Miyoshi (三好 真, Miyoshi Makoto)
- Marina Kazama (カザマ・マリナ, Kazama Marina) - Ai Saikawa (斉川 あい, Saikawa Ai)
- George Ikaruga (イカルガ・ジョージ, Ikaruga Jōji) - Daisuke Watanabe (渡辺 大輔, Watanabe Daisuke)
- Konomi Amagai (アマガイ・コノミ, Amagai Konomi) - Misato Hirata (平田 弥里, Hirata Misato)
- Teppei Kuze (クゼ・テッペイ, Kuze Teppei) - Kenta Uchino (内野 謙太, Uchino Kenta)
- Shingo Sakomizu (サコミズ・シンゴ, Sakomizu Shingo) - Minoru Tanaka (田中 実, Tanaka Minoru)
- Aide Toriyama (トリヤマ補佐官, Toriyama Hosakan) - Kenichi Ishii (石井 愃一, Ishii Kenichi)
- Secretary Aide Maru (マル補佐官秘書, Maru Hosakan Hisho) - Yutaka Maido (まいど 豊, Maido Yutaka)
- Yuki Misaki (ミサキ・ユキ, Misaki Yuki) - Saaya Ishikawa (石川 紗彩, Ishikawa Saaya)

=== Voice cast ===
- Kazuya Serizawa (セリザワ・カズヤ, Serizawa Kazuya): Shin Ishikawa (石川 真, Ishikawa Shin)
- Crew GUYS members: Sanshirō Wada (和田 三四郎, Wada Sanshirō), Misato Okano (おかの みさと, Okano Misato)
- Armored Darkness (アーマードダークネス, Āmādo Dākunesu): Ryūzaburō Ōtomo (大友 龍三郎, Ōtomo Ryūzaburō)
- Ultraman Hikari (ウルトラマンヒカリ, Urutoraman Hikari): Keiichi Nanba (難波圭一, Nanba Keiichi)
- Ultraman King (ウルトラマンキング, Urutoraman Kingu): Motomu Kiyokawa (清川元夢, Kiyokawa Motomu)

== Ending theme ==
- "Ultraman Mebius" (ウルトラマンメビウス, Urutoraman Mebiusu)
  - Lyrics: Goro Matsui
  - Composition: Kisaburo Suzuki
  - Arrangement: Seiichi Kyoda
  - Artist: Project DMM (Verse 1, Stage I; Verse 2, Stage II)
