= The Music (film) =

Japanese erotic drama film

- Film poster
- Directed by: Yasuzō Masumura
- Screenplay by: Yasuzō Masumura
- Based on: Ongaku by Yukio Mishima
- Produced by: Hiroaki Fujii
- Starring: Noriko Kurosawa; Toshiyuki Hosokawa; Choei Takahashi; Kohji Moritsugu
- Cinematography: Setsuo Kobayashi
- Edited by: Tatsuji Nakashizu
- Music by: Hikaru Hayashi
- Distributed by: Art Theatre Guild
- Release date: November 11, 1972 (Japan)
- Running time: 104 minutes
- Country: Japan
- Language: Japanese

The Music (Japanese: 音楽, Hepburn: Ongaku) is a 1972 Japanese erotic drama film directed by Yasuzo Masumura, based on the novel of the same name by Yukio Mishima. It was released through the Art Theatre Guild.

The leading roles are played by Noriko Kurosawa, Toshiyuki Hosokawa, Choei Takahashi and Kohji Moritsugu. The film score is by renowned composer Hikaru Hayashi.

== Plot ==
A woman, Reiko (Noriko Kurosawa), goes to a psychiatrist and tells him that she can no longer hear music and has developed sexual issues. During therapy, she recalls sexual experiences from childhood onwards, including incest with her brother.

== Cast ==
- Noriko Kurosawa
- Toshiyuki Hosokawa
- Choei Takahashi
- Kohji Moritsugu
