= Ultraman Mebius Side Story: Ghost Reverse =

- DVD cover for STAGE I
- Directed by: Makoto Yokoyama
- Written by: Yuji Kobayashi
- Produced by: Hiroyasu Shibuya; Haruto Nakayoshi
- Starring: Shunji Igarashi; Keiichi Nanba; Takeshi Kusao; Hiroya Ishimaru; Seizō Katō; Hisao Egawa; Daisuke Gōri; Ryōichi Tanaka; Hideyuki Hori; Hideyuki Tanaka; Jirō Dan; Kohji Moritsugu; Susumu Kurobe
- Production company: Tsuburaya Productions
- Distributed by: Bandai Visual
- Release dates: November 25, 2009 (STAGE I); December 22, 2009 (STAGE II)
- Running time: 27 minutes per episode
- Country: Japan
- Language: Japanese

Ultraman Mebius Side Story: Ghost Reverse (ウルトラマンメビウス外伝 ゴーストリバース, Urutoraman Mebiusu Gaiden Gōsuto Ribāsu) is a Japanese direct-to-video, serving as the sequel of 2006 Ultra Series Ultraman Mebius and taking place sometime after the final episode. Aside from original video work, it also received an expansion in the Televi-kun and Televi-Magazine publications in 2009. The series was released separately, The Dark Graveyard (暗黒の墓場, Ankoku no Hakaba) on November 25 and The Emperor's Resurrection (復活の皇帝, Fukkatsu no Kōtei) on December 22, 2009.

Aside from being Mebius's sequel, the time setting made it clear that it took place sometime after Ultra Galaxy Mega Monster Battle: Never Ending Odyssey and serves as a prologue to the 2009 film Mega Monster Battle: Ultra Galaxy, due to the involvement of Giga Battle Nizer. It also served as the final acting role for Seizō Katō and Daisuke Gōri in the Ultra Series. The film incorporated the elements of both chroma key and wire fu special effects.

== Plot ==
=== STAGE I: The Graveyard of Darkness ===
In the Land of Light, the Ultra Brothers received the interrupted Ultra Sign sent by Hikari, which came from the Monster Graveyard. Obtaining Zoffy's approval, Ace and Taro departed to investigate the matter while Mebius, on his routine patrol, was quickly notified by Zoffy to join the investigation.

In the middle of the journey, Mebius was intercepted by Glozam and later an Inpelaizer, who appeared to have been revived by unknown circumstances. Meanwhile, Ace and Taro entered the graveyard and discover mysterious phenomenons surrounding it and were attacked by the revived Heavenly Kings, Deathrem, Mefilas and Mebius Killer. The strange field also disrupted their powers and it was soon discovered the revived villains' plan was to enter the Valley of Flames and retrieve the Giga Battle Nizer, a device that can manipulate 100 monsters at once. Of course, neither the Ultra Warriors, nor the revived Heavenly King could enter due to the extreme heat. Leaving the Inpelaizer to fight Mebius, Glozam joined the Heavenly Kings, revealing Hikari to be their captive to Ace and Taro. As Mebius was about to be defeated, a mysterious warrior saved him and quickly defeated the Inpelaizer. The stranger introduced himself as Mechazam, a robot warrior in search of greater power and fought other warriors to become stronger. As Mebius left, Mehcazam took an interest in the Ultra Warrior, fighting for his comrades despite the injuries sustained and spied the former from afar.

Arriving at the Monster Graveyard, Mebius discovered that Ace and Taro were held hostages by the Heavenly Kings while Hikari was revealed to have joined their ranks. Their true objective was for Mebius to enter the Valley of Flames and retrieve the Giga Battle Nizer in hopes of reviving Alien Empera. Mebius was picked for such duty due to his Burning Brave mode possessing the ability to endure its fatal heat but was required to obtain it faster before the captured Ultras had their energies depleted. Believing that Mebius's strength comes from the need to protect others, Mechazam joined the former under the pretense to become stronger. In the middle of their journey, they were attacked by the Giga Battle Nizer's guardian, EX Zetton. Mebius entrusted the robot to retrieve the device while he dealt with the monster but during that time, Mebius took a hit meant for Mehcazam.

=== STAGE II: The Emperor's Resurrection ===
Continuing where the previous story left, Mechazam proceeded to attack EX Zetton in mad fury but almost perished in the molten lava until Mebius saved him, despite being heavily injured by EX Zetton. Being thrown to the Battle Nizer, Mechazam tried to break the seal under Mebius's guidance to reverse the disruption field but as the container was too strong. Mebius joined him later on and successfully shatter it, allowing Mebius's power to replenish. The two soon perform a counterattack on EX Zetton and successfully destroyed the monster but Mechazam was deactivated after saving Mebius from falling molten lava, finally knowing the worth of protecting others.

Despite Mebius having retrieved the Battle Nizer, the Heavenly Kings broke the deal by almost killing Mebius until Hikari swiped the device, having revealed to his betrayal to be a ruse, just for removing the magnetic energy field and rescued both Ace and Taro. They Ultras soon took down al but one of the Heavenly Kings. With Mefilas left on his own, he soon inserted Empera's essence to the Battle Nizer and reactivated Mechazam's true potential/identity as the Empera's revival apparatus, Ghost Reverse. The Ultra Warriors fought against him whereas Mebius tried to bring Mechazam to his senses, which briefly succeeded until Mefilas shove the Battle Nizer before being destroyed by Hikari. As the revival mechanism took effect, the Ultra Brothers plan to destroy both Mechazam and the Giga Battle Nizer but Mebius hesitated until Mechazam chastised the young warrior, willing to die while he was himself. Mebius assume Burning Brave Mode and used the Burning Mebium Dynamite technique, having a final conversation with Mechazam as he expressed his gratitude before exploding to pieces, leaving behind his sword as a grave marker. After the battle, Mebius resumed his patrol while labeling Mechazam as his precious comrade.

In the post credit scene, the Giga Battle Nizer survived the explosion and was salvaged by a mysterious figure.

== Voice cast ==
- Ultraman Mebius (ウルトラマンメビウス, Urutoraman Mebiusu): Shunji Igarashi (五十嵐 隼士, Igarashi Shunji)
- Ultraman Hikari (ウルトラマンヒカリ, Urutoraman Hikari): Keiichi Nanba (難波圭一, Nanba Keiichi)
- Ultraman Ace (ウルトラマンエース, Urutoraman Ēsu): Takeshi Kusao (草尾 毅, Kusao Takeshi)
- Ultraman Taro (ウルトラマンタロウ, Urutoraman Tarō): Hiroya Ishimaru (石丸 博也, Ishimaru Hiroya)
- Armored Mefilas (アーマードメフィラス, Āmādo Mefirasu): Seizō Katō (加藤 精三, Katō Seizō)
- Glozam (グローザム, Gurōzamu): Hisao Egawa (江川 央生, Egawa Hisao)
- Deathrem (デスレム, Desuremu) - Daisuke Gōri (郷里 大輔, Gōri Daisuke)
- Mebius Killer (メビウスキラー, Mebiusu Kirā): Ryōichi Tanaka (田中 亮一, Tanaka Ryōichi)
- Mechazam (メカザム, Mekazamu): Hideyuki Hori (堀 秀行, Hori Hideyuki)
- Zoffy (ゾフィー, Zofī), narrator: Hideyuki Tanaka (田中 秀幸, Tanaka Hideyuki)
- Ultraman Jack (ウルトラマンジャック, Urutoraman Jakku): Jiro Dan (団 時郎, Dan Jirō)
- Ultraseven (ウルトラセブン, Urutorasebun): Kohji Moritsugu (森次 晃嗣, Moritsugu Kōji)
- Ultraman (ウルトラマン, Urutoraman): Susumu Kurobe (黒部 進, Kurobe Susumu)

== Ending theme ==
- "Ultraman Mebius" (ウルトラマンメビウス, Urutoraman Mebiusu)
  - Lyrics: Gorō Matsui
  - Composition: Kisaburō Suzuki
  - Arrangement: Seiichi Kyoda
  - Artist: Voyager (Verse 1, Stage I; Verse 2, Stage II)
