= Ultraman Mebius & Ultraman Brothers =

Ultraman Mebius & the Ultra Brothers
- Directed by: Kazuya Konaka
- Written by: Keiichi Hasegawa
- Starring: Shunji Igarashi; Masaki Nishina; Ai Saikawa; Daisuke Watanabe; Kenta Uchino; Misato Hirata; Minoru Tanaka
- Cinematography: So Takahashi
- Edited by: Akira Matsuki
- Music by: Toshihiko Sahashi
- Distributed by: Shochiku
- Release date: September 16, 2006
- Running time: 93 minutes
- Country: Japan
- Language: Japanese
- Box office: $3.6 million.

Ultraman Mebius & the Ultra Brothers (ウルトラマンメビウス&ウルトラ兄弟, Urutoraman Mebiusu ando Urutora Kyōdai; lit. "Ultraman Mebius & the Ultra Brothers") is a superhero and kaiju film released in Japan on September 16, 2006, serving as a tie-in to the Ultraman Mebius series. It is the tenth original film in the Ultraman franchise, and celebrates the fortieth anniversary of the franchise. The film peaked at 3rd in the Japanese box offices.

== Plot ==
The film begins 20 years ago, on the moon, with four of the Ultra brothers, Ultraman, Ultraseven, Ultraman Jack, and Ultraman Ace locked in battle with the Ultimate Terrible kaiju, U-Killersaurus, created and controlled by Yapool. They manage to injure and weaken the beast and send it falling to the Earth, where it crashes and sinks in the sea of Kobe. As the Ultra Brothers approach the area, Yapool manifests before them in an astral form and vows that he and U-Killersaurus will recover and rise again. The Ultra brothers decide to seal Yapool and U-Killersaurus in the ocean, but this action depletes their energy and renders them unable to transform. Stranded on their human hosts and forms, the Ultra brothers take jobs to be in the area of Kobe should Yapool ever return.

20 years later, Mirai Hibino and crew GUYS are sent to Kobe as part of an investigation. There, he meets and befriends Aya Jinguji, an oceanographer who is also part of GUYS, as well as her skittish little brother, Takato. Aya explains to Mirai that, three months ago, Takato and his pet dog Art were attacked by the kaiju Kelbim, which resulted in Art being injured by the creature. The incident traumatized Takato and made him resentful toward GUYS and the Ultramen. Mirai bonds with Takato and works to restore the boy's faith in the Ultramen. While on Kobe, he also encounters the human identities of the Ultra brothers, who give him advice.

They witness an Ultra Sign sent by Zoffy warning them of a new threat known as the Alien Union, a quartet of aliens made of Alien Zarab, Alien Guts, Alien Nackle and Alien Temperor, who are working to release Yapool and U-Killersaurus from their prison. Alien Temperor is the first to attack, but is easily defeated and destroyed by Ultraman Mebius. However, his battle gives the other three aliens insight on how to take Mebius down.

Alien Zarab then proceeds to enact the next part of the plan. He kidnaps Aya and assumes her form to poison Mirai with a phony drink. As Mirai struggles, Zarab disguises himself as Ultraman Mebius and rampages across Kobe, much to Takato's shock. Mirai manages to regain his strength and transforms into Mebius. He confronts Zarab, exposes him as an impostor and destroys him before giving Takato a peace sign, but is still too weakened and is captured in a crystal cross by Alien Guts. With Mebius imprisoned, the other Ultra Brothers decide to transform to help him despite their low energy.

They battle Guts and Nackle and seemingly beat them before freeing Mebius. However, Guts and Nackle rise again and reveal they wanted to lure the Ultra Brothers in order to catch them. The two aliens imprison the Ultra Brothers in crystal crosses and proceed to syphon their energy to revitalize Yapool before tossing Mebius away, who turns back into Mirai.

Weakened, Mirai comes across Takato, and, regaining his courage, transforms into Mebius before the boy's eyes. He confronts Guts and Nackle once again, destroying the former and releasing the Ultra Brothers from their crosses. However, it is too late, and Yapool and U-Killersaurus are successfully released from their prison. As Alien Nackle boasts about his triumph, he is abruptly killed by U-Killersaurus, and Yapool reveals the Alien Union were nothing but pawns he manipulated to release him. U-Killersaurus then rises from the ground in a towering, gargantuan form called U-Killersaurus Neo, and a battle between it and the Ultramen ensues.

As the Ultra Brothers and Mebius struggle to fight the beast, Commander Zoffy and Ultraman Taro descend from the sky, restore the energy of their comrades and join them in the fray. As Mebius tries to shoot a beam at U-Killersaurus Neo, he notices the creature is keeping an unconscious Aya imprisoned within the crystal on its forehead. After revealing this, the other Ultramen fuse with Mebius, turning him into Mebius Infinity who quickly manages to save Aya and destroy U-Killersaurus in the process. Heavily weakened, Yapool vanishes into nothingness.

With U-Killersaurus and Yapool destroyed and the city saved, Mirai prepares to return to the Phoenix Nest base. Takato, with his faith restored, vows to become a member of GUYS when he grows up, while Aya grows suspicious of Mirai's true identity and suggests they should see each other again. Mirai says goodbye to them both and returns to the base with the rest of the crew, while the Ultra Brothers fly back to the Land of Light.

== Cast ==
- Mirai Hibino/Ultraman Mebius (Voice) (ヒビノ ミライ／ウルトラマンメビウス (声), Hibino Mirai/Urutoraman Mebiusu (Koe)): Shunji Igarashi (五十嵐 隼士, Igarashi Shunji)
- Shin Hayata/Ultraman (Voice) (ハヤタ・シン／ウルトラマン (声), Hayata Shin/Urutoraman (Koe)): Susumu Kurobe (黒部 進, Kurobe Susumu)
- Dan Moroboshi/Ultra Seven (Voice) (モロボシ・ダン／ウルトラセブン (声), Moroboshi Dan/Urutora Sebun (Koe)): Kohji Moritsugu (森次 晃嗣, Moritsugu Kōji)
- Hideki Go/Ultraman Jack (Voice) (郷 秀樹／ウルトラマンジャック (声), Gō Hideki/Urutoraman Jakku (Koe)): Jiro Dan (団 時郎, Dan Jirō)
- Seiji Hokuto/Ultraman Ace (Voice) (北斗 星司／ウルトラマンエース (声), Hokuto Seiji/Urutoraman Ēsu (Koe)): Keiji Takamine (高峰 圭二, Takamine Keiji)
- Aya Jinguji (ジングウジ・アヤ, Jingūji Aya): Aiko Ito (いとう あいこ, Itō Aiko)
- Takato Jinguji (ジングウジ・タカト, Jingūji Takato): Ouga Tanaka (田中 碧海, Tanaka Ōga)
- Ryu Aihara (アイハラ リュウ, Aihara Ryū): Masaki Nishina (仁科 克基, Nishina Masaki)
- Marina Kazama (カザマ マリナ, Kazama Marina): Ai Saikawa (斉川 あい, Saikawa Ai)
- George Ikaruga (イカルガ ジョージ, Ikaruga Jyōji): Daisuke Watanabe (渡辺 大輔, Watanabe Daisuke)
- Konomi Amagai (アマガイ コノミ, Amagai Konomi): Misato Hirata (平田 弥里, Hirata Misato)
- Teppei Kuze (クゼ テッペイ, Kuze Teppei): Kenta Uchino (内野 謙太, Uchino Kenta)
- Shingo Sakomizu (サコミズ シンゴ, Sakomizu Shingo): Minoru Tanaka (田中 実, Tanaka Minoru)
- Kobe Mayor Matsunaga (神戸市長 松永, Kōbe Shichō Matsunaga): Masami Horiuchi (堀内 正美, Horiuchi Masami)
- Assistant Official Koda (コウダ助役, Kōda Joyaku): Toshikazu Fukawa (布川 敏和, Fukawa Toshikazu)
- Secretary Mayor Midorikawa (市長秘書ミドリカワ, Shichō Hisho Midorikawa): Mariya Yamada (山田 まりや, Yamada Mariya)
- Ocean Curator Mr. Hirokawa (Masayoshi Hirokawa) (海洋学芸員 広川さん (広川 正義), Kaiyō Gakugeiin Hirokawa-san (Hirokawa Masayoshi)): Shingo Kazami (風見 しんご, Kazami Shingo)
- Tetsuya Yanagihara (柳原 哲也, Yanagihara Tetsuya) of America Zarigani
- Yoshiyuki Hirai (平井 善之, Hirai Yoshiyuki) of America Zarigani
- Hiroko Sakurai (桜井 浩子, Sakurai Hiroko)
- Yuriko Hishimi (ひし美 ゆり子, Hishimi Yuriko)
- Shunsuke Ikeda (池田 駿介, Ikeda Shunsuke)
- Mitsuko Hoshi (星 光子, Hoshi Mitsuko)
- Kiyoshi Hikawa (氷川 きよし, Hikawa Kiyoshi)
- Zoffy (ゾフィー, Zofī; Voice): Hideyuki Tanaka (田中 秀幸, Tanaka Hideyuki)
- Ultraman Taro (ウルトラマンタロウ, Urutoraman Tarō; Voice): Hiroya Ishimaru (石丸 博也, Ishimaru Hiroya)
- Yapool (ヤプール, Yapūru; Voice): Tesshō Genda (玄田 哲章, Genda Tesshō)
- Alien Zarab (ザラブ星人, Zarabu Seijin; Voice): Takeshi Aono (青野 武, Aono Takeshi)
- Alien Guts (ガッツ星人, Gattsu Seijin; Voice): Piston Nishizawa (ピストン 西沢, Pisuton Nishizawa)
- Alien Nackle (ナックル星人, Nakkuru Seijin; Voice): Ryūsei Nakao (中尾 隆聖, Nakao Ryūsei)
- Alien Temperor (テンペラー星人, Tenperā Seijin; Voice): Daisuke Gōri (郷里 大輔, Gōri Daisuke)

=== Suit actors ===
- Ultraman Mebius: Keiji Hasegawa (長谷川 恵司, Hasegawa Keiji)
- Ultraman: Kenya Soma (相馬 絢也, Sōma Kenya)
- Ultra Seven: Katsuhiko Watanabe (渡辺 勝彦, Watanabe Katsuhiko)
- Ultraman Jack: Akashi Kajimoto (梶本 明志, Kajimoto Akashi)
- Ultraman Ace: Keizo Yabe (矢部 敬三, Yabe Keizō)
- Ultraman Taro: Shun Kobayashi (小林 峻, Kobayashi Shun)
- Zoffy: Daisuke Fukuda (福田 大助, Fukuda Daisuke)
- The Imit-Ultraman Mebius: Hidenori Ogino (荻野 英範, Ogino Hidenori)
- Monsters & Aliens: Tomohiro Nagata (永田 朋裕, Nagata Tomohiro), Hiroaki Nakamura (中村 博亮, Nakamura Hiroaki), Hiroshi Suenaga (末永 博志, Suenaga Hiroshi), Makoto Itō (伊藤 慎, Itō Makoto)

== Music ==
Ending Theme

- 未来 (未来, Mirai; The future) by KIYOSHI
  - "未来" is read with a title "未来 (みらい, Mirai; The future)", but it is read in words "未来 (あす (明日), Asu; The tomorrow)".

Insert Theme

- believe~あきらめないで~ (あきらめないで, Akiramenaide; Don't give up) by KIYOSHI

== Reception ==
Ultraman Mebius & the Ultra Brothers earned $3,612,844 at the Japanese box office.
