= Masaki Nishina =

Japanese actor and tarento (born 1982)

- 仁科 克基
- Born: 2 September 1982 (age 43); Nishikyō-ku, Kyoto, Kyoto Prefecture, Japan
- Other names: Masaki Meguro (former stage name); Katsumi Nishina (former stage name); Kyujiro Iwai (岩井久次郎, Iwai Kyujiro)
- Occupations: Actor; tarento
- Years active: 1989–present
- Agent: Shochiku Entertainment
- Height: 175 cm (5 ft 9 in)
- Spouse(s): Hanako Takigawa (m. 2011; div. 2012) Manaka Nishihara (m. 2022)
- Parents: Hiroki Matsukata (father); Akiko Nishina (mother)
- Relatives: Daiju Meguro (half-brother); Hitomi Nishina (sister)

Masaki Nishina (仁科 克基, 仁科 正樹, Nishina Masaki; born 2 September 1982 in Nishikyō-ku, Kyoto, Kyoto Prefecture) is a Japanese actor and tarento. His former stage names were Masaki Meguro (目黒 正樹, Meguro Masaki) and Katsumi Nishina (仁科 克己, Nishina Katsumi). He is represented with Shochiku Entertainment.

== Filmography ==
=== Dramas ===
Year	Title	Role
	Ōtomo Sōrin: Kokoro no ōkoku o motomete	Yoshimi Otomo
1994	Mei Bugyō: Tōyama no Kin-san	
	Ieyasu ga Mottomo Osoreta Otoko: Yukimura Sanada	Daisuke Sanada
	Perfect Love!	
	Honma Mon	Tachiro Kaga
	Akechi Kogorōtaikaijin Nijūmensō	
2000	Daisuke Hanamura	Ryosuke Hanamura
	Crazed Fruit	Masafumi Nakano
	Kyoto Meikyū Annai	
2006	Ultraman Mebius	Ryu Aihara
	Okusama wa Keishisōkan	
2009	Q.E.D.	Ryūmon Terasaruhiko
2011	Zōka no Mitsu	Keiji Sawano
2015	Shihō Kyōkan-Miko Hotaka	

=== Variety ===
Year	Title
	Sekai Ulrun Taizai-ki
2006	All-Star Thanksgiving
2008	Anata ga Erabu: Ultraman Series Uchūbito Best 20!
2008	Ojisans 11
	Fishing Club
2011	Boku ra no Jidai'
	Sunday Japon

=== Films ===
Title	Role
Ultraman Cosmos vs. Ultraman Justice: The Final Battle	Ryojiro Shoda
Devilman	Ushikawa
The Kouga Ninja Scrolls	Jubei Yagyu
Senrigan	
First Love	Tamaro Tadashi
Decotora no Shū: Aizu-Kitakata-Ninjō Kaidō!	
Ultraman Mebius & Ultraman Brothers	Ryo Aihara
Dear Friends	Bartender
Aihyōka: Chi-Manako	
Hikarisasu Umi, Boku no Fune	

=== Direct-to-video ===
Year	Title	Role
2005	Hokori Takaki Yabō	Hideo Takatsu
2008	Ultraman Mebius Side Story: Armored Darkness	Ryu Aihara

=== Advertisements ===
Title
Earth Chemical Normat

=== Stage ===
Year	Title	Role
	Stand by Me	
	Kaze no Nagori –Ecchū owara Kaze no Bon–	
2007	Ultraman Premier Stage	Ryu Aihara
2008	Ultraman Premier Stage 2	Ryu Aihara (voice)
