= Ultraman Mebius Side Story: Hikari Saga =

- DVD cover
- Directed by: Yuichi Kikuchi
- Written by: Yuji Kobayashi
- Produced by: Hiroyasu Shibuya; Yukiko Otome; Takeyuki Okazaki; Tahei Yamanishi
- Starring: Keiichi Nanba; Motomu Kiyokawa
- Production company: Tsuburaya Productions
- Distributed by: NTT; Bandai Visual
- Release dates: June 30, 2006 (SAGA 1); August 7, 2006 (SAGA 2); November 20, 2006 (SAGA 3); October 26, 2007 (DVD)
- Running time: 13 minutes per episode
- Country: Japan
- Language: Japanese

Ultraman Mebius Side Story: Hikari Saga (ウルトラマンメビウス外伝 ヒカリサーガ, Urutoraman Mebiusu Gaiden Hikari Sāga) is a Japanese direct-to-video web series launched by FLET'S Square, Japan's first internet television delivery service. The web series was available to be watched from June 30, 2006 until March 31, 2007 whereas DVD release of the miniseries is available under the label Bandai Visual.

The series served as a spin-off to the 2006 Ultra Series entry, Ultraman Mebius as it focused on Ultraman Hikari, the show's secondary Ultra Warrior during his time in outer space. It had also won Digital Content Prize of Encouragement Award from the ATP Awards TV Grand Prix in 2006.

== Plot ==
=== SAGA 1: Tragedy on Aarb ===
Tragedy on Aarb (アーブの悲劇, Ābu no Higeki) took place before episode 5 of the series and is told from Hikari's flashback.

Hikari was once a nameless Ultraman who worked as a scientist for the Land of Light. He traveled to the Planet Aarb, a peaceful planet that had been devoid from conflict for a long as anyone knew, to study its environment. Upon landing, he was given a warm welcoming by the inhabitants of the planet, with several of them merging into a singular being as a means of communication. Through evolution, its inhabitants had assimilated with each other's and became one with the planet. Hikari doubted their hospitality but the Aarb reassured him, knowing that the giant's origin was from the Land of Light, famous for the Space Garrison organization that protected the galaxy for years. Captivated by the planet's beauty, Hikari wished to live on it but Aarb forbade him due to their prophecy of Tsurugi. In the prediction, their planet would be attacked by a space monster and should that happened, a hero would be descended from the sky, donning the armor of light and united with the soil of Aarb.

Determining to save the planet, the scientist flew towards the outer space and reached an unknown planet and sought the help of a legendary giant to obtain strength. A hooded figure test him with a rainstorm and ordered to clear it as if it was his own heart. The hooded man unveiled himself to be Ultraman King as he bestowed Hikari with the Knight Brace but warned him that "the purest water is the easiest to be polluted".

Returning to Planet Aarb, Hikari found that the prophecy was taking place as a monster attacked the planet and turned it to a barren wasteland. Aarb's inhabitants tried to fight back but several of them were consumed. Ignoring King's own advice, Hikari was driven by his own anger and attacked the monster in a mad fury but his lack of training as a warrior put him at a disadvantage. The monster retreated, leaving Hikari in despair for his inability to protect Aarb until the spirits of the fallen inhabitants assimilated with him, transforming into the warrior known as Hunter Knight Tsurugi. Tsurugi traveled to countless planets and learned the monster's name, Bogar, who had invaded countless planets and consumed their inhabitants. Tsurugi soon followed the monster to its next target: Earth.

=== SAGA 2: Test of a Hero ===
Test of a Hero (勇者の試練, Yūsha no Shiren) took place after episode 17 of the series.

After leaving Earth and entrusting Mebius with the Knight Brace, Hikari flew out to space and encountered a Bemstar on his journey. With the loss of Knight Brace putting him at odds, he was forced to fight on his own strength. In the midst of the battle, Zoffy arrived and reprimanded Hikari for his reckless decision to fight the monster. Hikari had died once but his human host's will, Kazuya Serizawa was the reason that the Mother of Ultra granted the former a new life. He also remembered how Mebius fought on Earth because of being captivated by humanity's hearts whereas he had once been driven mad for his inability to protect Aarb, causing him to lose his own heart once. Although he could no longer return to the past, he still had lives to protect and thus Zoffy assisted Hikari in defeating the monster. After the battle, Hikari noticed another Bemstar heading towards the Earth. Zoffy however told him to believe in Mebius as Hikari was invited to join the Space Garrison.

The battle was watched by Ultraman King as Hikari noted his belief that his encounter with his friends helped him escape from the darkness.

=== SAGA 3: Return of Light ===
Return of Light (光の帰還, Hikari no Kikan) took place before episode 35 of the series.

The Father of Ultra sensed an upcoming threat on Earth. Although he was reluctant to send Hikari, Zoffy assured him otherwise and allowed the young warrior to go. While heading towards the Earth, Hikari received an Ultra Sign from Mebius to meet him at the Planet Aarb but upon arrival, it was revealed to be an impostor, who soon took the appearance of Hunter Knight Tsurugi and planned to go to Earth in said form. With his offer to Hikari denied, the impostor revealed himself as Alien Babarue, who had once stole the Ultra Key from the Land of Light. While fighting, Babarue sealed Hikari in an iceberg and once more offered a place under his wing but left him to die on the planet when the latter refused.

In his frozen state, Hikari was visited by the spirit of Aarb, who lent him the strength to break free and bestowing him the form of Hunter Knight Tsurugi once more. Unlike before, where his gear was dubbed the Armor of Vengeance for his sole agenda of revenge, this was instead the Armor of the Hero and was consistent with the prophecy of Tsurugi that was foretold before. Hikari used his newfound power to defeat Babarue before the alien retreated and fled to Earth. As Hikari departed, Ultraman King remarked that a new hero was born and had acknowledged the former as an Ultraman.

== Production ==
Due to the series' low budget, the series opted its initial cyclorama element for a chroma key-based background. Yuji Kobayashi envisioned the Side Story's element to be based on the Star Wars film franchise while Hikari's approach with the Father of Ultra being compared to that of the 1978 Superman film.

== Voice cast ==
- Ultraman Hikari (ウルトラマンヒカリ, Urutoraman Hikari): Keiichi Nanba (難波圭一, Nanba Keiichi)
- Ultraman King (ウルトラマンキング, Urutoraman Kingu), Alien Babarue (ババルウ星人, Babarū Seijin): Motomu Kiyokawa (清川元夢, Kiyokawa Motomu)
- Zoffy (ゾフィー, Zofī): Hideyuki Tanaka (田中 秀幸, Tanaka Hideyuki)
- Father of Ultra (ウルトラの父, Urutora no Chichi): Tokuma Nishioka (西岡 徳馬, Nishioka Tokuma)
- Mother of Ultra (ウルトラの母, Urutora no Haha): Masako Ikeda (池田 昌子, Ikeda Masako)
- Aarb (アーブ, Ābu): Yuko Ogura (小倉 優子, Ogura Yūko)
- Mysterious Old Man (謎の老人, Nazo no Rōjin): Kōichi Toshima (外島 孝一, Toshima Kōichi)

== Ending theme ==
- "Radiance ~Ultraman Hikari no Theme~" (Radiance～ウルトラマンヒカリのテーマ～, Rediansu ~Urutoraman Hikari no Tēma~; Radiance ~Ultraman Hikari's Theme~)
  - Lyrics/Composition: Hideaki Takatori
  - Arrangement: Hiroaki Kagoshima
  - Artist: Project DMM
