= Hanako Takigawa =

Japanese actress (born 1988)

Hanako
- 華子
- Born: Hanako Ouchi; 16 September 1988 (age 38); Kanagawa Prefecture, Japan
- Other names: Hanako Takigawa; Hana-chan
- Occupations: Actress; tarento; gravure idol
- Years active: 2004–
- Style: Gravure
- Height: 161 cm (5 ft 3 in)
- Spouses: Masaki Nishina (m. 2011; div. 2012) Unknown (m. 2023)
- Children: 1
- Mother: Yumi Takigawa

Hanako Takigawa (多岐川 華子, Takigawa Hanako; born 16 September 1988 in Kanagawa Prefecture), stage name Hanako (華子) is a Japanese actress, tarento and gravure idol. (Note: Her surname from 2010 to 2012 was Nishina (仁科). From her birth to 1997 it was Achiha (阿知波).) Her real name and former stage name is Hanako Ouchi (大内 華子, Ōuchi Hanako).

== Life ==
Hanako graduated from Horikoshi High School. She is previously represented with Tristone Entertainment Inc. Hanako's mother is Yumi Takigawa, who is also an actress, and her father was Shinsuke Achiha, former president of Actors Promotion. (Note: Her parents were divorced in 1997, and grew up with her mother.)

On 11 January 2011, Hanako officially married with actor Masaki Nishina after dating for a year. They officially divorced on 22 October 2012 after less than a year of their marriage.

On 7 August 2023, Hanako remarried to a general man. On 20 November, she announced her pregnancy of her first child. On 18 March 2024, she announced that she gave birth to a baby girl.

== Filmography ==
=== Films ===
| Year | Title | Role | Notes |
|---|---|---|---|
| 2006 | I am Nihonjin | | |
| 2006 | Tabi no Okurimono 0:00-Patsu | | First lead role |
| 2009 | Hatsukoi: Natsu no Kioku | Rika Narushima | Lead role |
| 2014 | Kashō Dōchū | Sayono | |
| 2015 | W: Futatsu no Kao o Motsu Onna-tachi | Shima Shimano | |

=== TV dramas ===
| Year | Title | Role | Network | Notes |
|---|---|---|---|---|
| 2006 | Sasurai Shochō: Shohei Kazama | Yoko Ogura | TV Tokyo | |
| 2006 | Mito Kōmon | | TBS | Pt. 36 and 37 |
| 2008 | Hontō to Uso to Tequilla | Waitress | TV Tokyo | |
| 2008 | Men Dol: Ikemen Idol | Rei | TV Tokyo | |
| 2008 | Shissō Chōsa Hito Ryosuke Minato | | TV Asahi | |
| 2009 | Goro Inagaki no Kosuke Kindaichi: Akuma no Temariuta | Fumiko Inami | Fuji TV | |
| 2009 | Mama wa New Half | Purine (Eriko Nakazono) | TV Tokyo | |
| 2009 | Damashi e Utamaro | | TV Asahi | |
| 2009 | Untouchable | | TV Asahi | E-2 |
| 2010 | Hanchō: Jinnan-sho Asaka Han | Female police officer | TBS | S-3 E-1 |
| 2010 | Tenshi no Dairinin | Aki Kiyagawa | THK | |
| 2010 | Kyoto Minami-sho Kanshiki File | | TV Asahi | |
| 2011 | Hamidashi Bengoshi Shiro Tatsumi | Yuka Fukamiyuki | TV Asahi | |
| 2012 | Suzuko no Koi | Akirai Saigumi | THK | |
| 2012 | Yamehan Kensuke Shindo-goroshi no Jiken-bo | Haruka Miyoshi | TBS | |
| 2012 | Keishi Seiji Fukamachi | Ryo Fukamachi | TBS | |
| 2012 | Onsen Waka okami no Satsujin Suiri | Saki Ando | TV Asahi | |
| 2012 | Keiji Seiichi Yoshinaga: Namida no Jiken-bo | Yukina Miyamoto | TV Tokyo | |
| 2013 | Keishi Seiji Fukamachi 2 Satsujin-sha ni Love Song o | Ryo Fukamachi | TBS | |
| 2013 | Oni Keiji: Kosaku Yoneda | Natsu Tahara | Fuji TV | |
| 2014 | Tokubou: Keisatsuchō Tokushu Bōhan-ka | Ai Tsumura | YTV | E-1 |
| 2014 | Soko o Nantoka | Saeki | NHK BS Premium | E-4 |
| 2015 | Shinshun Drama Special Doctors Saikyō no Meii 2015 | Nina | TV Asahi | |
| 2015 | Lunch no Akko-chan | Reika | NHK BS Premium | E-4 |
| 2015 | Hokkai Dōkei Jiken File: Keibuho: Seiko Gojo | Mariyuki Mizuno | TV Tokyo | |
| 2015 | Kinkyū Torishirabe-shitsu | Keiko Nitta | TV Asahi | |
| 2015 | Shin Yame Ken no Onna | Sarina Ozeki | TV Asahi | |
| 2016 | Shin Ryokō Sakka Jiro Chaya | Mika Shishido | TV Tokyo | |
| 2016 | Sekai Ichi Muzukashii Koi | Shino Shinohara | NTV | E-1 |
| 2016 | Ie Uru Onna | Yukino Takenouchi | NTV | E-7 |

=== TV programmes ===
| Year | Title | Network | Notes | Ref. |
|---|---|---|---|---|
| | Odoru! Sanma Goden!! | NTV | | |
| | Ai no Apron | TV Asahi | | |
| | Bulb Untouchable | ABC | | |
| 2004 | Itsu demo Emi o! | KTV | | |
| 2009 | Mezamashi TV | Fuji TV | "Motto Imadoki!" | |
| 2009 | Shumi no Engei | NHK-E | | |
| 2009 | Lion no gokigenyō | Fuji TV | | |
| 2009 | Mirai Sōzō-dō | NTV | | |
| 2009 | Hikari Ota's If I Were Prime Minister... Secretary Tanaka | NTV | | |
| 2010 | Chakushin Orei! Kētai Ōgiri | NHK-G | | |
| 2010 | Ai no Shura Bara | YTV | | |
| 2010 | Ichihachi | MBS | | |
| 2013 | Shimura da Yo! | Fuji TV | | |
| 2013 | Shimura Sho! | Fuji TV | | |
| 2013 | Ken Shimura no Baka Tonosama | Fuji TV | | |
| 2014 | Shimura-za | Fuji TV | | |
| 2014 | Ken Shimura no daijōbudā | Fuji TV | | |
| 2016 | Shikujiri-sensei: Ore mitai ni naru na!! | TV Asahi | | |
| 2016 | Boat Race Live | BS Fuji | | |

=== Journey programmes ===
| Year | Title | Network | Notes |
|---|---|---|---|
| 2006 | Tabi no Kaori | TV Asahi | |
| 2007 | Ītabi Yume Kibun | TV Tokyo | |
| 2013 | Ken Shimura no | TV Asahi | |
| 2014 | Yumi Takigawa-Hanako no Michinoku Mankitsu! Futaritabi | BS Asahi | |
| 2015 | Geki Uma Rettō | BS Japan | E-73 and 89 |
| 2016 | Shuppatsu! Local-sen: Kiki komi Hakken Tabi | BS Japan | E-14 |
| 2017 | Densha & Bus de Iku! Sōshun no Izuhantō sugo ro ku no Tabi | TV Tokyo | Part of the Fujita Team |

=== Advertisements ===
| Year | Title | Ref. |
|---|---|---|
| 2004 | Sugakiya Foods Honten no Aji | |
| 2005 | Lotte Ghana Milk Chocolate Chocobis | |
| 2005 | Dainichi Blue Heater | |
| 2005 | Sangaria Oishī Ocha | |
| 2005 | Kowa Shin Una Coeur Cool "Moroccos Head" | |
| 2007 | Sankyo CR Fever Sōsei no Aquarion | |
| 2008 | Sankyo CR Fever Dainatsumatsuri | |
| 2008 | Sankyo CR Fever Star Wars Darth Vader | |

=== Stills ===
| Year | Title |
|---|---|
| 2006 | Kensetsu-gyō Nendomatsu Rōdō Saigai Bōshi Kyōchō Gekkan poster |

=== Others ===
| Year | Title | Notes |
|---|---|---|
| 2008 | Solato | Image girl |

== Bibliography ==
=== Photo albums ===
| Year | Title | ISBN Code |
|---|---|---|
| 2005 | Girl Friend | ISBN 978-4898297865 |
| 2005 | Mushō Onna | ISBN 978-4872791952 |
| 2008 | Hana. | ISBN 978-4847041167 |

=== DVD ===
| Year | Title |
|---|---|
| 2005 | Love and light |
| 2005 | Pure Eyes |
| 2006 | Prism |
| 2008 | Hanayakana Shunkan |
| 2008 | Hana. |

=== Calendars ===
| Year | Title | Code |
|---|---|---|
| 2005 | Hanako Takigawa 2006-Nen Calendar | ISBN 978-4777420612 |
| 2008 | Hanako Takigawa 2009-Nen Calendar | ASIN B001ESSN8S |
