= Kohji Moritsugu =

Japanese actor

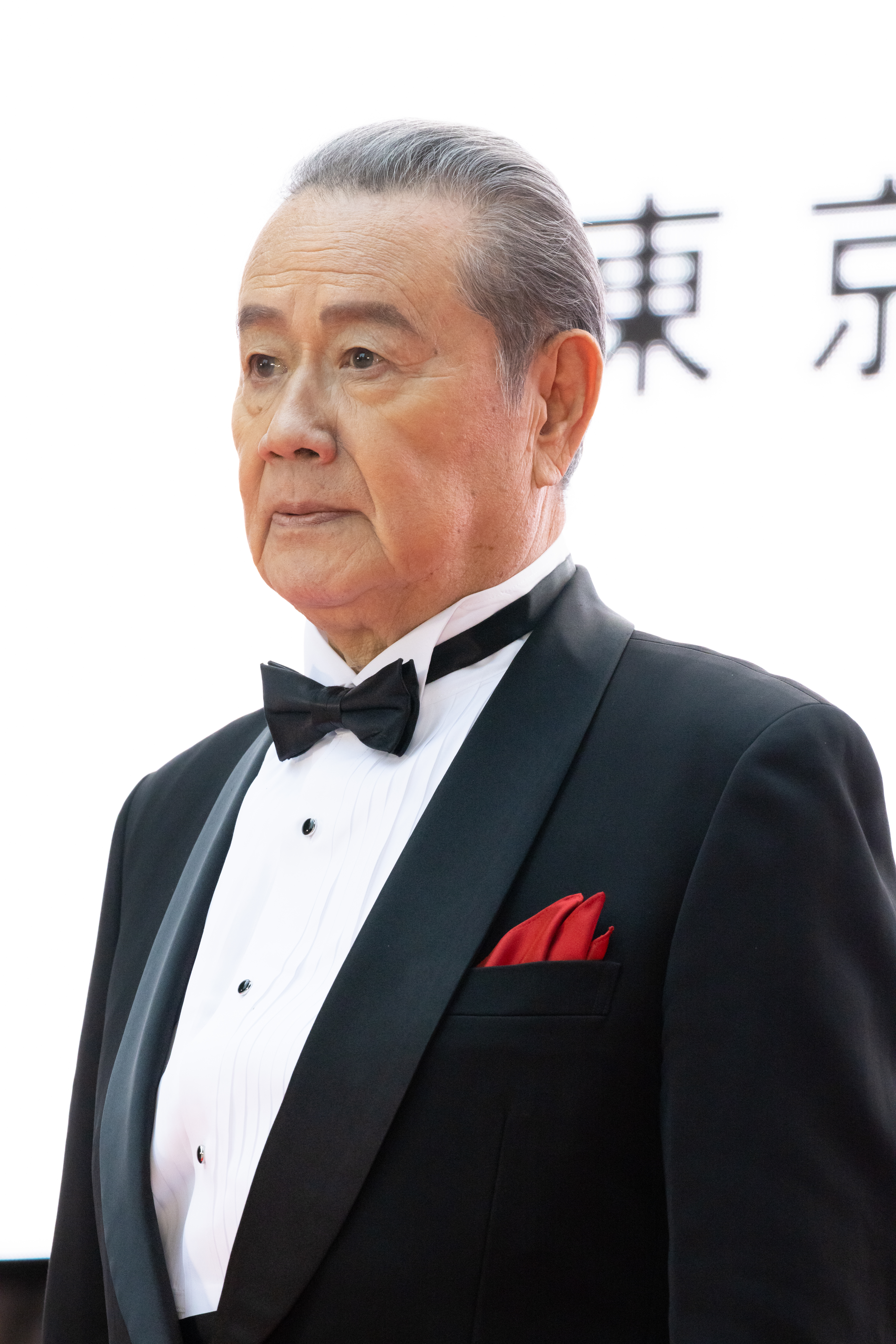
Moritsugu at the 2022 Tokyo International Film Festival

Kohji Moritsugu (森次 晃嗣, Moritsugu Kōji, born March 15, 1943) is a Japanese actor best known for his role as Dan Moroboshi in Ultraseven.

== Filmography ==
=== Films ===
- The Music (1972)
- Zero Fighter Burns (1984)
- Furimukeba Ai (1984)
- Robot Carnival (1987) - Protagonist in "Presence" segment
- Ultraman Zearth (1996-1997) – Ban Satsuma
- Ultraman Mebius & Ultraman Brothers (2006) – Dan Moroboshi/Ultra Seven
- Superior Ultraman 8 Brothers (2008) – Dan Moroboshi/Ultra Seven
- Persona (2008)
- Ultraman Mebius Side Story: Ghost Reverse (2009) – Ultra Seven (voice)
- Mega Monster Battle: Ultra Galaxy (2009) – Dan Moroboshi/Ultra Seven
- Ultraman Zero: The Revenge of Belial (2010) – Ultra Seven (voice)
- Ultraman Zero: Killer The Beat Star (2011) – Ultra Seven (voice)
- Ultraman Saga (2012) – Dan Moroboshi/Ultra Seven
- Ultraman Orb: I'm Borrowing the Power of Your Bonds! (2017) - Dan Moroboshi/Ultra Seven
- Summer Blooms (2018)
- Go! Go! Sakura Club (2023)

=== TV Drama ===
- Ultra Seven (1967) – Dan Moroboshi/Ultra Seven, Jiro Satsuma (ep 17)
- Ten to Chi to (1969) – Hōjō Ujimasa
- Utsukushiki Challenger (1971) – Akihisa Takamine
- Ultraman Leo (1974) – Captain Dan Moroboshi (ep 1-40, 51)
- Kusa Moeru (1979) – Hatakeyama Shigetada
- Akō Rōshi (1979) – Maehara Isuke
- Tokugawa Ieyasu (1983) – Toda Yoshimitsu
- Taiheiki (1991) – Hosokawa Akiuji
- Kamen Rider Blade (2004) – Hiroshi Tennōji (ep 38 - 46)/Kerberos II (ep 46)
- Ultra Fight Orb (2017) – Ultra Seven (voice)
- The Tiger and Her Wings (2024) – Mizunuma

=== Guest appearance ===
- The Return of Ultraman (1971) – Dan Moroboshi/Ultra Seven (ep 38)
- Nemuri Kyōshirō (1972) (ep12)
- Hissatsu Shiokinin (1973) – Senpachi (ep16)
- Ultraman Taro (1973) – Dan Moroboshi/Ultra Seven (ep 33, 34)
- Shin Hissatsu Shiokinin (1977) (ep33)
- Hissatsu Shigotonin (1980) (ep70)
- Ultraman Max (2005) – Dr. Takeru Ozaki (ep 19)
- Ultraman Mebius (2007) – Dan Moroboshi/Ultra Seven (ep 46, 50)
- Ultraseven X (2007) – Dan Moroboshi (ep 12)
- Downtown Rocket (2018) – Dan Moroboshi (ep 11)

=== Stage Shows ===
- Ultraman Premium Stage 'Tears of the Starry Sky' (2007) – Dan Moroboshi
- Ultraman Premium Stage II 'Star of Life' (2008) – Dan Moroboshi
