= Jirō Dan =

Japanese actor (1949–2023)

- 団 時朗
- Jiro Dan portraying Hideki Go in The Return of Ultraman (1971)
- Born: January 30, 1949; Kyoto, Japan
- Died: March 22, 2023 (aged 74)
- Years active: 1966–2023

Jiro Dan (団 時朗, Dan Jirō, January 30, 1949 – March 22, 2023) was a Japanese actor, singer, and model best known for his role as Hideki Go/Ultraman Jack in The Return of Ultraman, making guest appearances in subsequent Ultraman productions as well. His real name was Hideo Murata (村田 秀雄). He was born in Kyoto and graduated from Heian High School.

== Illness and death ==
In 2017, Jiro was diagnosed with lung cancer. He died on March 22, 2023, at the age of 74.

== Selected filmography ==
=== Films ===
- 1983 - Daijōbu, My Friend
- 1995 - Zero Woman
- 1997 - Ultraman Zearth 2
- 2006 - Ultraman Mebius & Ultraman Brothers – Hideki Go / Ultraman Jack
- 2008 – Superior Ultraman 8 Brothers – Hideki Go / Ultraman Jack
- 2009 – Mega Monster Battle: Ultra Galaxy – Hideki Go / Ultraman Jack
- 2010 – Ultraman Zero: The Revenge of Belial – Hideki Go / Ultraman Jack
- 2012 – Ultraman Saga – Hideki Go / Ultraman Jack
- 2016 – What a Wonderful Family! II
- 2018 – Nisekoi – Adelt Wogner Kirisaki

=== Television ===
- 1971, 1972 – The Return of Ultraman – Hideki Go / Ultraman Jack
- 1972 – Ultraman Ace – Hideki Go / Ultraman Jack
- 1972 – Wild 7
- 1973, 1974 – Ultraman Taro – Hideki Go / Ultraman Jack
- 1974, 1975 – Super Robot Mach Baron
- 1974 – Ultraman Leo – Hideki Go / Ultraman Jack
- 1975, 1976 – Shounen Tanteidan BD7
- 1981, 1982 – Robot 8-chan
- 1982, 1983 – Batten Robomaru
- 1984 – Nebula Mask Machine Man
- 1990 – La Belle Fille Masquée Poitrine
- 1996, 1997 – Godzilla Island – G-Guard Commander
- 2002 – Ninpuu Sentai Hurricaneger – Ikki Kasumi
- 2006, 2007 – Ultraman Mebius – Hideki Go / Ultraman Jack
- 2012 – MONSTERS
- 2012 – Perfect Blue
- 2015 – Hamon
- 2016 – Doctor X
- 2019 – Kishiryu Sentai Ryusoulger - Elder
- 2021 – Tada Rikon Shitenai Dake – Toshimichi Kakino
