= Minoru Tanaka (actor) =

Japanese actor (1966–2011)

- 田中 実
- Born: 27 October 1966; Ōta, Tokyo, Japan
- Died: 25 April 2011 (aged 44); Ōta, Tokyo, Japan
- Occupation: Actor
- Years active: 1985–2011
- Agent: JVC Entertainment Networks

Minoru Tanaka (田中 実, Tanaka Minoru; October 27, 1966 – April 25, 2011) was a Japanese actor born in Ōta, Tokyo, Japan. He was a graduate of the Tokyo metropolitan Yukigaya high school, Mumeijuku and was represented by JVC Entertainment Networks at the time of his death.

== Filmography ==
=== Television ===
- Rinrin to (1990, NHK)
- Nurse Station (1991, TBS)
- Yanagi-bashi Ryojō (2000, NHK)
- Onsen e Yukō! (Series, TBS) – A manager
- Deka Kizoku (After Part 2, NTV)
- Jungle
- Aibō (Season IV, EX)
- Byōin e Yukō! (Series TBS) – Yūji Katase
- Wednesday Mystery 9 "A medical examiner Shinomiya Hadzuki" 6 (2005, TX) – Kōichi Machida
- anego (2005 NTV)
- Voice recorder (2005 TBS)
- Ultraman Mebius (2006 CBC/TBS) – Captain Shingo Sakomizu

=== Film ===
- Uruu no Machi (1991)
- Gekkō no Natsu (1993) – Shinsuke Kazama
- Uso (1995)
- Miyazawa Kenji -Sono Ai- (1996)
- Kanzō Sensei (1998)
- I love You (1999) – Ryūichi Mizukoshi
- Declaration of war (2000) – Takayasu Tsutsumi
- Godzilla Against Mechagodzilla (2002) – A guard
- Kusa no Ran (2004)
- Deguchi no nai Umi (2006) – Toda
- Ultraman Mebius & Ultraman Brothers (2006) – Captain Shingo Sakomizu
- Kamen Rider W Returns: Kamen Rider Accel (2011) – Police Officer Hiroshi Sagami / Commander Dopant

=== Stage ===
- Taiyō to Tsuki ni Somuite (1999)
- Kenkyaku Shōbai (2001, 2003)
- Proof (2001)
- Kotoba (2002)

=== Dubbing ===
- Ally McBeal – Raymond Millbury (Josh Hopkins)
- Enemy at the Gates (2003 NTV edition) – Commissar Danilov (Joseph Fiennes)
- Hornblower – Horatio Hornblower (Ioan Gruffudd)
- Starship Troopers – Johnny Rico (Casper Van Dien)
- Summer Scent – Yoo Min-woo (Song Seung-heon)
- Sunshine – Robert Capa (Cillian Murphy)

=== Television CM ===
- Kao "Bath Magicrin"
- Kao "Econa Brand"
- Chugai Pharmaceutical "Guronsan"
