= Ultraman Mebius =

- Promotional poster
- Genre: Superhero; Tokusatsu; Science fiction Action/Adventure; Kaiju; Kyodai Hero
- Created by: Tsuburaya Productions
- Based on: Ultraman by Eiji Tsuburaya
- Developed by: Masanao Akahoshi
- Directed by: Tomoki Sano
- Starring: Shunji Igarashi; Masaki Nishina; Ai Saikawa; Daisuke Watanabe; Kenta Uchino; Misato Hirata; Minoru Tanaka
- Composers: Toshihiko Sahashi, Toru Fuyuki
- Country of origin: Japan
- No. of episodes: 50 (+7 side stories)

Production
- Running time: 30 mins
- Production companies: Tsuburaya Productions; Chubu-Nippon Broadcasting

Original release
- Network: JNN (CBC, TBS)
- Release: April 8, 2006 – March 31, 2007

Related
- Ultraman Max; Ultraseven X

Ultraman Mebius (ウルトラマンメビウス, Urutoraman Mebiusu) is a Japanese television series produced by Tsuburaya Productions and Chubu-Nippon Broadcasting. It is the 15th entry (21st overall) and 40th anniversary production in the Ultra Series, which first began in 1966. It premiered on the Tokyo Broadcasting System on April 8, 2006. Unlike the two prior entries, Ultraman Nexus (2004) and Ultraman Max (2005), Mebius was moved from Saturday mornings to Saturday evenings at 05:30 and the show went on to air in Korea in April 2012.

On October 22, 2014, Crunchyroll announced that the entire series would be available that day on their streaming service for the United States, Canada, Latin America, Europe, Australia, and New Zealand. On February 26, 2018, Toku announced that they would broadcast the series in the United States on their television channel, starting on March 19, 2018.

The series opens with the introduction of the rookie Ultraman Mebius, who is sent to Earth by the Father of Ultra. The series is set 40 years after the shows of Ultraman (1966), and makes many references from Ultra Q (1966) through to Ultraman 80 (1980). "Mebius" is the Japanese approximation of Möbius; the Möbius strip is a recurring motif in the series.

== Plot ==
Before leaving for the Earth, Ultraman Mebius was granted the Mebius Brace by the Father of Ultra and told of the importance of the name "Ultraman", a legacy he would have to live up to when he reached Earth. On his way there, Mebius saw a transport ship being sucked into the Ultra Zone, The crew was saved by the sacrifice of the Captain's son, Hiroto Ban. seeing his selflessness, Mebius tried to save the young man but was a minute too late. He created his human form after the young man, Hiroto Ban, in his honor. And he joined GUYS (Guards for Utility Situation) under the alias of Mirai Hibino.

== Characters ==
=== Crew GUYS ===
GUYS (Guards for UtilitY Situation) is an attack team formed at some point of time after UGM's disbandment. As no monster attacks were recorded since the last 25 years, Dinozaur had killed a majority of the original team members, save for the cadet named Ryu Aihara. Once Mirai and Sakomizu joined GUYS, the former recruited several civilians he encountered prior due to their commitment at the height of monster attacks.

Field members

- Mirai Hibino (ヒビノ・ミライ, Hibino Mirai):
- Ryu Aihara (アイハラ・リュウ, Aihara Ryū): The 20-year-old sole survivor of his original Crew GUYS team during Dinozaur's attack. As he becomes the field commander, Ryu is dedicated to protect his new teammates and eventually acknowledges their skill to be on an equal level with past attack teams.
- Marina Kazama (カザマ・マリナ, Kazama Marina): A 19-year-old motorcycle racer with enhanced sense of hearing.
- George Ikaruga (イカルガ・ジョージ, Ikaruga Jōji): A 20-year-old professional soccer player with enhanced sense of sight and reflexes, which allows him to utilize ranged weapons at a precision rate.
- Konomi Amagai (アマガイ・コノミ, Amagai Konomi): An 18-year-old aspiring nursery school teacher working part time at a nursery school, her dedication to save the rabbits lead to an assembly of civilians that would become future members of Crew GUYS. Although usually works as an operator, she can also join the battle and guiding the Maquette Monsters.
- Teppei Kuze (クゼ・テッペイ, Kuze Teppei): An 18-year-old team member who is knowledgeable in the Ultra Brothers' exploits and their fight against monsters. Being a medical student, he was groomed to become the heir of his father's hospital, but gained the blessing from his parents to continue working on Crew GUYS after his bravery in saving the building from Insectus' invasion.
- Shingo Sakomizu (サコミズ・シンゴ, Sakomizu Shingo): The commander of the new Crew GUYS after Serizawa's seeming death. Despite his appearance as a 40-year-old, he was actually a veteran in the defense force and was once an SSSP member whose encounter with Zoffy lead to the foundation of GUYS. His encounter on space resulted in a permanent youthful appearance despite being 70 years old.
- Kazuya Serizawa (セリザワ・カズヤ, Serizawa Kazuya): The 30-year-old original commander of the previous Crew GUYS, he was thought to be killed by Dinozaur's rampage after saving Ryu, but his body was rescued by Hunter Knight Tsurugi as a human shell to operate on Earth. During Tsurugi's brief death, Serizawa's will resurfaced as he persistent on the Ultra's survival. From that day on, Serizawa becomes a permanent host of Hikari and occasionally assisting Crew GUYS in their fight.

Staff members

- Aide Toriyama (トリヤマ補佐官, Toriyama-hosakan): The leader of the Japanese branch of GUYS, he issues orders to GUYS and gets frantic with joy whenever they accomplish a mission. While generally portrayed as cowardly, sycophantic and bumbling incompetent throughout the series, he gathers his resolve and stands up to Inspector Shiki when the latter demands that GUYS turn Ultraman Mebius/Hibino Mirai over.
- Secretary Aide Maru (マル補佐官秘書, Maru-hosakan-hisho): Toriyama's secretary, he follows Toriyama around and often corrects his speech mistakes.
- Yuki Misaki (ミサキ・ユキ, Misaki Yuki): The deputy inspector general, she reports monsters to GUYS.

=== Ultra Warriors ===
- Ultraman Mebius: see here
- Ultraman Hikari (ウルトラマンヒカリ, Urutoraman Hikari): A scientist from the Land of Light, who ventured to Earth as Hunter Knight Tsurugi (ハンターナイトツルギ, Hantā Naito Tsurugi) to exact revenge on Bogar. After killing the monster and freed from the armor, the scientist Ultra adopted the name "Ultraman Hikari" from Ryu and received his membership from the Space Garrison to assist Mebius several of his fights on Earth.

== Episodes ==
No.	Title	Directed by	Written by	Original release date
1	"A Fateful Encounter"; Transliteration: "Unmei no Deai" (Japanese: 運命の出逢い)	Tomoki Sano	Masanao Akahoshi	April 8, 2006
2	"Our Wings"; Transliteration: "Ore-tachi no Tsubasa" (Japanese: 俺達の翼)	Tomoki Sano	Masanao Akahoshi	April 15, 2006
3	"Only One Life"; Transliteration: "Hitotsu kiri no Inochi" (Japanese: ひとつきりの命)	Hirochika Muraishi	Masanao Akahoshi	April 22, 2006
4	"Broken Bonds"; Transliteration: "Kizudarake no Kizuna" (Japanese: 傷だらけの絆)	Hirochika Muraishi	Yūji Kobayashi	April 29, 2006
5	"A Game Changing Shot"; Transliteration: "Gyakuten no Shūto" (Japanese: 逆転のシュート)	Toshiyuki Takano	Keiichi Hasegawa	May 6, 2006
6	"The Two Under the Deep Sea"; Transliteration: "Shinkai no Futari" (Japanese: 深海の二人)	Toshiyuki Takano	Hideyuki Kawakami	May 13, 2006
7	"Fanton’s Lost Item"; Transliteration: "Fanton no Otoshimono" (Japanese: ファントンの落し物)	Kengo Kaji	Masanao Akahoshi	May 20, 2006
8	"Horrifying Predator"; Transliteration: "Senritsu no Hoshokusha" (Japanese: 戦慄の捕食者)	Kengo Kaji	Yūji Kobayashi	May 27, 2006
9	"Armor of Vengeance"; Transliteration: "Fukushū no Yoroi" (Japanese: 復讐の鎧)	Naoki Ohara	Keiichi Hasegawa	June 3, 2006
10	"Pride of GUYS"; Transliteration: "Gaizu no Hokori" (Japanese: GUYSの誇り)	Naoki Ohara	Hideyuki Kawakami	June 10, 2006
11	"Mother’s Miracle"; Transliteration: "Haha no Kiseki" (Japanese: 母の奇跡)	Kenji Suzuki	Masanao Akahoshi	June 17, 2006
12	"The First Errand"; Transliteration: "Hajimete no Otsukai" (Japanese: 初めてのお使い)	Kenji Suzuki	Hideyuki Kawakami	June 24, 2006
13	"Marina in the Wind"; Transliteration: "Kaze no Marina" (Japanese: 風のマリナ)	Hirochika Muraishi	Keiichi Hasegawa	July 1, 2006
14	"One Road"; Transliteration: "Hitotsu no Michi" (Japanese: ひとつの道)	Hirochika Muraishi	Ai Ōta	July 8, 2006
15	"Fortress of the Phoenixes"; Transliteration: "Fushichō no Toride" (Japanese: 不死鳥の砦)	Tsugumi Kitaura	Akira Tanizaki	July 15, 2006
16	"A Sword Master from Space"; Transliteration: "Uchū no Kengō" (Japanese: 宇宙の剣豪)	Tomoo Haraguchi	Masanao Akahoshi	July 22, 2006
17	"Formation of Our Vows"; Transliteration: "Chikai no Fōmēshon" (Japanese: 誓いのフォーメーション)	Tomoki Sano	Masanao Akahoshi	July 29, 2006
18	"Pressure on Ultraman"; Transliteration: "Urutoraman no Jūatsu" (Japanese: ウルトラマンの重圧)	Tomoki Sano	Hideyuki Kawakami	August 5, 2006
19	"The Isolated Grandstand"; Transliteration: "Kokō no Sutando Purēyā" (Japanese: 孤高のスタンドプレイヤー)	Naoki Ohara	Ai Ōta	August 12, 2006
20	"The Chief Inspector’s Message"; Transliteration: "Sōkan no Dengon" (Japanese: 総監の伝言)	Naoki Ohara	Keiichi Hasegawa	August 19, 2006
21	"A Call from Void"; Transliteration: "Kokū no Yobigoe" (Japanese: 虚空の呼び声)	Hirochika Muraishi	Akira Tanizaki	August 26, 2006
22	"Future Days"; Transliteration: "Hibi no Mirai" (Japanese: 日々の未来)	Hirochika Muraishi	Masanao Akahoshi	September 2, 2006
23	"The Ocean Waves of Time"; Transliteration: "Toki no Uminari" (Japanese: 時の海鳴り)	Yuichi Abe	Ai Ōta	September 9, 2006
24	"Resurrection of Yapool"; Transliteration: "Fukkatsu no Yapūru" (Japanese: 復活のヤプール)	Yuichi Abe	Keiichi Hasegawa	September 16, 2006
25	"The Poisonous Moth's Program"; Transliteration: "Dokuga no Puroguramu" (Japanese: 毒蛾のプログラム)	Tsugumi Kitaura	Hideyuki Kawakami	September 23, 2006
26	"Flying to Tomorrow"; Transliteration: "Asu e no Hishō" (Japanese: 明日への飛翔)	Tsugumi Kitaura	Yūji Kobayashi	September 30, 2006
27	"The Champion of the Fierce Fight"; Transliteration: "Gekisen no Hasha" (Japanese: 激闘の覇者)	Kazuya Konaka	Akira Tanizaki	October 7, 2006
28	"Konomi’s Treasure"; Transliteration: "Konomi no Takaramono" (Japanese: コノミの宝物)	Kazuya Konaka	Keiichi Hasegawa	October 14, 2006
29	"Day of Farewell"; Transliteration: "Wakare no Hi" (Japanese: 別れの日)	Tomoki Sano	Masanao Akahoshi	October 21, 2006
30	"The Flame of Promise"; Transliteration: "Yakusoku no Honō" (Japanese: 約束の炎)	Tomoki Sano	Masanao Akahoshi	October 28, 2006
31	"The Hopes of Comrades"; Transliteration: "Nakama-tachi no Omoi" (Japanese: 仲間達の想い)	Takeshi Yagi	Hideyuki Kawakami	November 4, 2006
32	"The Monster Tamer’s Legacy"; Transliteration: "Kaijūtsukai no Isan" (Japanese: 怪獣使いの遺産)	Takeshi Yagi	Minato Shukawa	November 11, 2006
33	"The Woman With Blue Fire"; Transliteration: "Aoi Hi no On'na" (Japanese: 青い火の女)	Naoki Ohara	Keiichi Hasegawa	November 18, 2006
34	"The Man Who Lost His Hometown"; Transliteration: "Furusato no Nai Otoko" (Japanese: 故郷のない男)	Naoki Ohara	Masanao Akahoshi	November 25, 2006
35	"The Ultramarine Light and Shadow"; Transliteration: "Gunjō no Hikari to Kage" (Japanese: 群青の光と影)	Hirochika Muraishi	Yūji Kobayashi	December 2, 2006
36	"Mirai’s Younger Sister"; Transliteration: "Mirai no Imōto" (Japanese: ミライの妹)	Hirochika Muraishi	Masanao Akahoshi	December 16, 2006
37	"Father’s Back"; Transliteration: "Chichi no Senaka" (Japanese: 父の背中)	Yuichi Abe	Masanao Akahoshi & Akira Tanizaki	December 23, 2006
38	"Isana of the Ocean"; Transliteration: "Ōshan no Isana" (Japanese: オーシャンの勇魚)	Yuichi Abe	Ai Ōta	January 6, 2007
39	"The Invincible Mother"; Transliteration: "Muteki no Mama" (Japanese: 無敵のママ)	Kazuya Konaka	Minato Shukawa	January 13, 2007
40	"Lonely Paradise"; Transliteration: "Hitori no Rakuen" (Japanese: ひとりの楽園)	Kazuya Konaka	Minato Shukawa	January 20, 2007
41	"Teacher’s Memories"; Transliteration: "Omoide no Sensei" (Japanese: 思い出の先生)	Tomoki Sano	Hideyuki Kawakami	January 27, 2007
42	"An Old Friend’s Visit"; Transliteration: "Kyūyū no Raihō" (Japanese: 旧友の来訪)	Tomoki Sano	Akira Tanizaki	February 3, 2007
43	"Threatening Mebius Killer"; Transliteration: "Kyōi no Mebiusu Kirā" (Japanese: 脅威のメビウスキラー)	Naoki Ohara	Masanao Akahoshi	February 10, 2007
44	"Ace’s Wish"; Transliteration: "Ēsu no Negai" (Japanese: エースの願い)	Naoki Ohara	Keiichi Hasegawa	February 17, 2007
45	"Deathrem’s Plan"; Transliteration: "Desuremu no Takurami" (Japanese: デスレムのたくらみ)	Hirochika Muraishi	Ai Ōta	February 24, 2007
46	"Immortal Grozam"; Transliteration: "Fujimi no Gurōzamu" (Japanese: 不死身のグローザム)	Hirochika Muraishi	Hideyuki Kawakami	March 3, 2007
47	"Mephilas’s Game"; Transliteration: "Mefirasu no Yūgi" (Japanese: メフィラスの遊戯)	Yuichi Abe	Yūji Kobayashi	March 10, 2007
48	"Advent of the Emperor: Final Trilogy I"; Transliteration: "Kōtei no Kōrin -Saishū Sanbusaku Wan-" (Japanese: 皇帝の降臨 —最終三部作I—)	Yuichi Abe	Keiichi Hasegawa	March 17, 2007
49	"Dark Clouds of Despair: Final Trilogy II"; Transliteration: "Zetsubō no An'un -Saishū Sanbusaku Tsū-" (Japanese: 絶望の暗雲 —最終三部作II—)	Tomoki Sano	Masanao Akahoshi	March 24, 2007
50	"Words from the Heart: Final Trilogy III"; Transliteration: "Kokoro kara no Kotoba -Saishū Sanbusaku Surī-" (Japanese: 心からの言葉 —最終三部作III—)	Tomoki Sano	Masanao Akahoshi	March 31, 2007

== Side stories ==
Ultraman Mebius had three side stories in accordance to the series.

- Ultraman Mebius Side Story: Hikari Saga (2006)
  The first side story, separated into three parts and launched as FLET's internet television service, before being released on DVD in 2007. The story took place during the series' run, featuring Ultraman Hikari as the main viewpoint character, ranging from his past to his membership in Space Garrison.
- Ultraman Mebius Side Story: Armored Darkness (2008)
  The second side story, separated into two parts and sold on DVD. The story took place after the final episode of the series.
- Ultraman Mebius Side Story: Ghost Reverse (2009)
  The third and final side story, separated into two parts and sold on DVD. The story serves as a prologue to the 2009 Ultra Series movie, Mega Monster Battle: Ultra Galaxy.

== Cast ==
- Mirai Hibino, Hiroto Ban (バン・ヒロト, Ban Hiroto): Shunji Igarashi (五十嵐 隼士, Igarashi Shunji)
- Ryu Aihara: Masaki Nishina (仁科 克基, Nishina Masaki)
- Marina Kazama: Ai Saikawa (斉川 あい, Saikawa Ai)
- George Ikaruga: Daisuke Watanabe (渡辺 大輔, Watanabe Daisuke)
- Konomi Amagai: Misato Hirata (平田 弥里, Hirata Misato)
- Teppei Kuze: Kenta Uchino (内野 謙太, Uchino Kenta)
- Shingo Sakomizu: Minoru Tanaka (田中 実, Tanaka Minoru)
- Aide Toriyama: Kenichi Ishii (石井 愃一, Ishii Kenichi)
- Secretary Aide Maru: Yutaka Maido (まいど 豊, Maido Yutaka)
- Yuki Misaki: Saaya Ishikawa (石川 紗彩, Ishikawa Saaya)
- Kazuya Serizawa: Shin Ishikawa (石川 真, Ishikawa Shin)
- Mysterious woman (Bogal) : Moeko Koyama (小山 萌子, Koyama Moeko)
- Kadokura (カドクラ): Shigeki Kagemaru (影丸 茂樹, Kagemaru Shigeki)
- Keiko Kuze (クゼ・ケイコ, Kuze Keiko): Hiroko Hayashi (林 寛子, Hayashi Hiroko)
- Tetsuharu Kuze (クゼ・テツハル, Kuze Tetsuharu): Ryo Kamon (加門 良, Kamon Ryō)
- METEOR (メテオール, Meteōru) operator: Naoshi Murata (村田 尚史, Murata Naoshi)
- Nursery school teacher: Mari Iwasa (岩佐 まり, Iwasa Mari)
- Chief Maintenance Araiso (アライソ整備長, Araiso-seibichō): Katsuhiko Watabiki (綿引 勝彦, Watabiki Katsuhiko)
- Professor Asami Fujisawa (フジサワ・アサミ博士, Fujisawa Asami-hakase): Kei Ishibashi (石橋 けい, Ishibashi Kei)
- Mitsuhiko Hirukawa (蛭川 光彦, Hirukawa Mitsuhiko): Kosei Kato (加藤 厚成, Katō Kōsei)
- Alien Psychokino "Kako" (サイコキノ星人 カコ, Saikokino Seijin Kako): Ayumi Takamune (高宗 歩未, Takamune Ayumi)
- Man in black: Koji Shimizu (清水 綋治, Shimizu Kōji)

=== Voice cast ===
- Ultraman Hikari/Hunter Knight Tsurugi, Kodaigon The Other (コダイゴンジアザー, Kodaigon Ji'azā; 12): Keiichi Nanba (難波 圭一, Nanba Keiichi)
- Father of Ultra (ウルトラの父, Urutora no Chichi): Tokuma Nishioka (西岡 徳馬, Nishioka Tokuma)
- Mother of Ultra (ウルトラの母, Urutora no Haha): Masako Ikeda (池田 昌子, Ikeda Masako)
- Zoffy (ゾフィー, Zofī): Hideyuki Tanaka (田中 秀幸, Tanaka Hideyuki)
- Ultraman Taro (ウルトラマンタロウ, Urutoraman Tarō): Hiroya Ishimaru (石丸 博也, Ishimaru Hiroya)
- Yapool (ヤプール, Yapūru): Tesshō Genda (玄田 哲章, Genda Tesshō)
- Grozam (グローザム, Gurōzamu): Hisao Egawa (江川 央生, Egawa Hisao)
- Deathrem (デスレム, Desuremu): Daisuke Gōri (郷里 大輔, Gōri Daisuke)
- Alien Mefilas (メフィラス星人, Mefirasu Seijin): Seizō Katō (加藤 精三, Katō Seizō)
- Alien Empera (エンペラ星人, Enpera Seijin): Kenji Utsumi (内海 賢二, Utsumi Kenji)
- Mebi-Navi narration: Mami (摩味)
- Opening narration of episodes 27-30: Hiroshi Isobe (磯部 弘, Isobe Hiroshi)

=== Guest cast ===
- Heizo (平蔵, Heizō; 12): Shun Ueda (うえだ 峻, Ueda Shun)
- Rinko Sawaki (サワキ・リンコ, Sawaki Rinko; 13): Asuka Shimizu (清水 あすか, Shimizu Asuka)
- Tetsuro Ban (バン・テツロウ, Ban Tetsurō; 21, 22): Sei Hiraizumi (平泉 成, Hiraizumi Sei)
- Tatsumi Kazama (カザマ タツミ, Kazama Tatsumi; 23)：Kento Ono (小野健人, Ono Kento)
- Announcer (31): Koichi Sudo (須藤 公一, Sudō Kōichi)
- Misa Takamura (タカムラ・ミサ, Takamura Misa; 33): Mai Saitō (斉藤 麻衣, Saitō Mai)
- Medium (33): Shoichiro Akaboshi (赤星 昇一郎, Akaboshi Shōichirō)
- Gen Otori (おおとり ゲン, Ōtori Gen; 34): Ryu Manatsu (真夏 竜, Manatsu Ryū)
- Hiroshi Isana (勇魚 洋, Isana Hiroshi; 38): Kōhei Murakami (村上 幸平, Murakami Kōhei)
- Heitaro Hinode (日ノ出平太郎, Hinode Heitaro; 39)：Toshiya Toyama (遠山俊也, Toyama Toshiya)
- Sayuri Hinode (日ノ出 サユリ, Hinode Sayuri; 39): Jun Miho (美保 純, Miho Jun)
- Naoko (ナオコ, Naoko; 40)：Riisa Naka (仲里依紗, Naka Risa)
- Takeshi Yamato (矢的 猛, Yamato Takeshi; 41): Hatsunori Hasegawa (長谷川 初範, Hasegawa Hatsunori)
- Supreme General Chancellor Takenaka (タケナカ最高総議長, Takenaka-saikō-sōgichō; 42, 43): Kenji Sahara (佐原 健二, Sahara Kenji)
- Man in black (42–44): Koji Shimizu (清水 綋治, Shimizu Koji)
- Aya Jinguji (ジングウジ・アヤ, Jingūji Aya; 43, 44): Aiko Ito (いとう あいこ, Itō Aiko)
- Seiji Hokuto (北斗 星司, Hokuto Seiji; 44, 50): Keiji Takamine (高峰 圭二, Takamine Keiji)
- Yuko Minami (南 夕子, Minami Yūko; 44): Mitsuko Hoshi (星 光子, Hoshi Mitsuko)
- Hideki Go (郷 秀樹, Gō Hideki; 45, 50): Jiro Dan (団 時郎, Dan Jirō)
- President of the Kikuchi Electric Appliances Company (きくち電器商会, Kikuchi Denki Shōkai) (45): Eiichi Kikuchi (きくち 英一, Kikuchi Eiichi)
- Dan Moroboshi (モロボシ・ダン, Moroboshi Dan; 46, 50): Kohji Moritsugu (森次 晃嗣, Moritsugu Kōji)
- Shin Hayata (早田 進ハヤタ・シン, Hayata Shin); 47, 50): Susumu Kurobe (黒部 進, Kurobe Susumu)
- Inspector Shiki (シキ査察官, Shiki-sasatsukan; 48): Yôsuke Saitô (斉藤 洋介, Saitō Yōsuke)
- Mother (48, 49): Keiko Goto (五藤 圭子, Gotō Keiko)

== Songs ==
Opening theme

- "Ultraman Mebius" (ウルトラマンメビウス, Urutoraman Mebiusu)
  - Lyrics: Goro Matsui
  - Composition: Kisaburo Suzuki
  - Arrangement: Seiichi Kyoda
  - Artist: Project DMM (Verse 1, Episodes 1 – 26; Verse 2, Episodes 27 – 50)

Insert songs

- "Run through! - Wandaba" CREW GUYS ""
  - Lyrics: Kazuho Mitsuda
  - Composition / Arrangement: Toru Fuyuki
  - Artist: Project DMM with TMC
- "Radiance-Ultraman Hikari's Theme"
  - Lyrics and composition: Hideaki Takatori
  - Arrangement: Hiromasa Kasashima
  - Artist: Project DMM
- "Oath to you"
  - Lyrics, composition, arrangement: Daimon Kazuya
  - Artist: Project DMM
- "Ultra miracle"
  - Lyrics, composition, arrangement: Daimon Kazuya
  - Artist: Project DMM

== Film tie-ins ==
A theatrical film, entitled Ultraman Mebius & Ultraman Brothers, was released in Japan on September 16, 2006. It takes place sometime after the end of episode 15 ("Phoenix's Fortress"), and is referenced in episode 24 ("Yapool's Rebirth").

== Home media ==
In July 2020, Shout! Factory announced to have struck a multi-year deal with Alliance Entertainment and Mill Creek, with the blessings of Tsuburaya and Indigo, that granted them the exclusive SVOD and AVOD digital rights to the Ultra series and films (1,100 TV episodes and 20 films) acquired by Mill Creek the previous year. Ultraman Mebius, amongst other titles, will stream in the United States and Canada through Shout! Factory TV and Tokushoutsu.

Mill Creek Entertainment released Ultraman Mebius in the United States on DVD on May 24, 2022.

== Reception ==
In the first half of airing, it struggled in terms of viewership due to the time shift from Ultraman Max. However, after the release of the Ultraman Mebius & Ultra Brothers movie, awareness of the series increased, and the viewership ratings reached their highest level since Ultraman Nexus, and toy sales at the end of the year were also strong. In particular, the episodes featuring the Ultra Brothers received support from a wide range of viewers, including not only the main target audience of children, but also parents and enthusiasts. However, overall toy sales in 2006 were 3.6 billion, lower than the sales of the previous two titles.

== See also ==
- Ultra Series - Complete list of official Ultraman-related shows.
