= Heisei Ultraseven =

- The online poster advertisement for DVD releases of Heisei Ultraseven in the year 2000.
- Genre: Tokusatsu; Kaiju; Kyodai Hero; Science fiction Super Hero; Drama
- Created by: Tsuburaya Productions
- Based on: Ultraseven by Eiji Tsuburaya
- Written by: Masakazu Migita; Shinichi Kamisawa; Junki Takegami; Shinobu Oito; Ai Ota; Kazuhiko Gōdo; Shin Yoshida
- Directed by: Shinichi Kamisawa; Toshiyuki Takano; Naoki Ohara
- Starring: Kohji Moritsugu; Sandayu Dokumamushi; Shigeki Kagemaru; Koji Nanjo; Katsuyuki Yamazaki; Kunio Masaoka; Wataru Koga; Kaoru Ukawa; Rieko Adachi; Kenji Sahara
- Composer: Tōru Fuyuki
- Country of origin: Japan
- Original language: Japanese
- No. of seasons: 4
- No. of episodes: 16 (total): 2 (NTV Specials, 1994) 3 (30th Anniversary Specials, 1998) 6 (The Final Chapters, 1999) 5 (Evolution, 2002)

Production
- Producers: Shinichirō Maeda; Masahiro Tsuburaya; Minoru Ōno; Toshihiko Fujinami; Shuji Imai
- Editor: Akira Matsuki (TV Specials)
- Running time: 47–73 minutes
- Production companies: Tsuburaya Productions; VAP; Yomiko Advertising

Original release
- Network: Nippon TV (1994)
- Release: March 21, 1994 – September 25, 2002

Related
- Ultraseven

Heisei Ultraseven (平成ウルトラセブン, Heisei Urutorasebun) is a collective of Japanese direct-to-video instalments, serving as a standalone sequel to the 1967-68 tokusatsu series Ultraseven. The series took place in an alternate universe featuring Ultraseven diverging from Ultraman and other succeeding Ultra Series starting from Return of Ultraman. (Note: The decision to ignore every other continuity that succeeded Ultraseven is due to the TV Special's storyline contrasting a lot of elements in Dan's later appearance in other Ultra Series, such as his appearance in Return of Ultraman and Ultraman Leo.)

The project initially started as a pair of television specials in the year 1994, made to promote environmental awareness in Japan. It received a trilogy of specials in 1998 to promote Ultraseven's 30th anniversary and a hexalogy in 1999 to ostensibly wrapping up the entire series. To celebrate the 35th anniversary of Ultraseven, the Evolution pentalogy was introduced in 2002 as a direct follow up to the 1999 hexalogy and became the definitive ending to Heisei Ultraseven.

== Synopsis ==
=== NTV Duology (1994) ===
10 years after Ultraseven's fight with Re-Pandon, the Ultra crash-landed on Earth after being injured from the fight against Alien Pitt. At this point, Furuhashi lead a trio of young members in the Ultra Guard in protecting the Earth against invading forces. When the Alien Pitt unleashed their monster Eleking against mankind, Seven was revived after the aliens' assassination attempts went awry. The newly resurrected Seven managed to kill Eleking and the Alien Pitts after freeing their hostage.

At some point of time, the Alien Metron siblings set their sight on Earth to make it as their secondary home. The siblings pose as environmental terrorist to fool a college professor into their aid, going as far as to even clone a massive dinosaur as their supporter. Seven's human form, Dan, returned to assist the new members of Ultra Guard in their investigation, but preferred to hide his presence from Furuhashi. Seven disappeared after the death of Alien Metron and the alien base's destruction seemingly consumed the Ultra in an explosion.

=== 30th Anniversary Memorial Trilogy (1998) ===
Dan survived the explosion of Alien Metron's base, but this resulted with an amnesia and forced him to take refuge at the Murata family. Meanwhile, Furuhashi has elevated to the rank of TDF staff officer, while a new batch of Ultra Guard members were selected under Captain Sanshiro Shiragane. After regaining his memory, Dan assisted the new Ultra Guard members in their fight against another extraterrestrial threats. In several occasions, Dan tends to masquerade as the UG rookie Kazamori by switching places with the youth. Seven departed from Earth once more after reuniting with Furuhashi for the final time.

=== The Final Chapters Hexalogy (1999) ===
Several years later, former Ultra Guard member Kaji was promoted into a TDF staff officer and became a war hawk who proposed the Friendship Plan to annihilate potentially hostile alien planets after losing his teammates in the past. Kaji's actions caused the Alien Valkyrie's invasion on Earth, leading to the death of Furuhashi and forcing Dan/Seven to masquerade as Kazamori for an entire year. Without Furuhashi to supervise, Kaji took the late officer's role and further complicating matters for the Ultra Guard members in their missions against the alien invaders.

When a lone Nonmalt appeared to enact her revenge on mankind, the existence of TDF's Omega File were brought to light as it would threaten mankind's status quo on Earth, due to their predecessors were revealed to be invaders that had overthrow the original natives (Nonmalt) as the planet's dominant species. Nevertheless, Seven chose to dedicate his life in protecting mankind by killing Nonmalt's monster, Zabangi, despite his action was marked as violating the rules of outer space by interfering with a civil war. After returning the real Kazamori to the Ultra Guard, Seven left Earth to face his comeuppance, as he was imprisoned in the Horsehead Nebula for his actions.

=== Ultraseven Evolution Pentalogy (2002) ===
Five years after the Omega Files incident, peace returned to Earth after TDF agreed to sign a peace treaty with the outer space civilizations. Although Kazamori had long retired from his service, the Ultra Guard was due to be disbanded due to TDF's arms reduction policy, but a string of incidents caused them to operate once more alongside a new member named Kisaragi, eventually going rogue after discovering TDF had been infested with alien invaders. Kazamori on the other hand face against the threat of Alien Garut, the mastermind behind the secret alien invasion as he and the other invaders plan to conquer Earth by taking control of the Plant Life Form, a race that was supposedly inheritors of Earth's future.

Kazamori bonded with Seven after Satomi's death freed the Ultra from his prison and had protected the Plant Life Form from both aliens and TDF/Ultra Guard members alike. Once discovering that mankind was never forsaken for Earth's future (as well as Alien Garut falsifying the Akashic Record for his own benefit), Kazamori/Seven killed the alien to end his invasion plans. After entrusting the Akashic Record and the Plant Life Form to the Ultra Guard, Kazamori parted ways with his former teammates.

== List of instalments ==
=== Video works ===
- 1994 TV specials
  - Ultraseven - Operation: Solar Energy (ウルトラセブン 太陽エネルギー作戦, Urutorasebun Taiyō Enerugī Sakusen; 1994/03/21)
  - Ultraseven - Planet of the Earthlings (ウルトラセブン 地球星人の大地, Urutorasebun Chikyū Seijin no Daichi; 1994/10/10)
- Ultraseven 30th Anniversary Trilogy (ウルトラセブン誕生30周年記念3部作, Urutorasebun Tanjō Sanjū-shūnenkinen San-busaku)
  - Lost Memory (失われた記憶, Ushinawareta Kioku; 1998/06/05)
  - Eternal Earth (地球より永遠に, Chikyū yori Eien ni; 1998/07/05)
  - Betrayal Sun (太陽の背信, Taiyō no Haishin; 1998/08/05)
- Ultraseven 1999 The Final Chapters Hexalogy (ウルトラセブン1999最終章6部作, Urutorasebun Senkyūhyakukyūjūkyū Saishūshō Roku-busaku)
  - Legends and Glory (栄光と伝説, Eikō to Densetsu; 1999/07/07)
  - The Sky-Flying Iron Colossus (空飛ぶ大鉄塊, Soratobu Daitekkai; 1999/08/05)
  - The Day the Fruit Ripens (果実が熟す日, Kajitsu ga Jukusu Hi; 1999/09/05)
  - The End of the Contract (約束の果て, Yakusoku no Hate; 1999/11/05)
  - The Duplicated Man (模造された男, Mozōsareta Otoko; 1999/12/05)
  - I am an Earthling (わたしは地球人, Watashi wa Chikyū-jin; 1999/12/31)
- Ultraseven 35th Anniversary Evolution Pentalogy (ウルトラセブン誕生35周年"EVOLUTION"5部作, Urutorasebun Tanjō Sanjūgo-shūnen "Eboryūshon" Go-busaku)
  - Dark Side (ダーク・サイド, Dāku Saido; 2002/06/21) (Note: The fourth episode (Innocent) was published first out of the five episodes, followed by episode 1 (Dark Side) and so on.)
  - Perfect World (パーフェクト・ワールド, Pāfekuto Wārudo; 2002/07/24)
  - Neverland (ネバーランド, Nebārando; 2002/08/21)
  - Innocent (イノセント, Inosento; 2002/05/22)
  - Akashic Records (アカシックレコード, Akashikku Rekōdo; 2002/09/25)

=== Novel ===
Both novels are written by Junki Takegami, illustrated by Shinobu Tanno and published by Asahi Sonorama in year 2002.

- Ultraseven Episode: 0 (ウルトラセブン EPISODE：0, Urutorasebun Episōdo Zero): Released in May 2002. It served as a compilation of the hexalogy series with slight alteration to the storyline.
- Ultraseven Evolution (ウルトラセブンEVOLUTION, Urutorasebun Eboryūshon): Released in November 2002. In addition to being a novel adaptation of the Evolution pentalogy, it also served as a direct follow-up to the aforementioned Episode: 0 novel.

== Production ==
In 1994, Ministry of International Trade and Industry established March 21 as the Solar Day (太陽の日, Taiyō no Hi), and a TV special program was held by both the Japan Solar System Development Association (JSSDA) and Yomiko Advertising to spread the awareness. The project was originally planned to be an animation work, but then-producer of Yomiko Advertising, Toshihiko Fujinami decided to do a different approach. Ultraseven was decided as the icon (due to the hero using solar energy to empower himself), hence the first Heisei Ultraseven, Operation: Solar Energy was broadcast on March 21, 1994 on Nippon TV, exactly on Japan's Vernal Equinox Day. The aforementioned special itself inherited a majority of the filming crew behind Gridman the Hyper Agent, and the same team would eventually work in the production of Ultraman Tiga. The use of Alien Pitt and Eleking, as well as Sandayu Dokumamushi and Yuriko Hishimi's return to their roles as Furuhashi and Anne were due to long time fan's familiarity with Ultraseven. As a result of the special's nature, Kohji Moritsugu could only provide narrative role for the story instead of reprising his role as Dan Moroboshi. Due to Operation: Solar Energy's popularity, another TV special was conceived to coincide with Japan's Health and Sports Day on October 10, 1994. The second special, Planet of the Earthlings, ended with Seven's apparent death. Director Shinichi Kamisawa hoped for a continuation where the Ultra survived, and he got his wish in the following home video series.

Starting from the 1998 trilogy, Dan had grown his hair and changed his outfit under Kohji Moritsugu's demand to be based on his favorite actor, Steven Seagal. According to director Shinichi Kamisawa, the central theme of Ultraseven was "protecting the Earth from extraterrestrial invaders", while the 1998 trilogy was "the coexistence of Earth and mankind". From here onwards, the collaboration with VAP for original video contents was due to their past association with Tsuburaya Productions during the making of Moon Spiral miniseries. With the exception of Kōji Nanjo, actors for the new members of Ultra Guard were carefully selected through an audition of 2,000 candidates. Shigeki Kagemaru was not able to reprise his role as Kaji due to the filming of Ultraman Tiga had already wrapped up by the time the trilogy's filming took place.

The Final Chapters Hexalogy was initially advertised as the supposedly definitive end to the Heisei Ultraseven as a whole, with the tagline of "Goodbye, Seven" (さらば、セブン, Saraba, Sebun) was even advertised in the June 5, 1999 press conference. Several of the Ultra Guard actors get to be the main focus of certain episodes. The central theme of the hexalogy was "there are enemies within the existence of human beings themselves". Shoji Nakayama, the actor of Kaoru Kiriyama in Ultraseven, was meant to reprise his role in the final instalment of the hexalogy, but the actor died at the same month of the filming (December 1998).

== Cast ==
- Dan Moroboshi (モロボシ・ダン, Moroboshi Dan), narrator: Kohji Moritsugu (森次晃嗣, Moritsugu Kōji)
- Shigeru Furuhashi (フルハシ・シゲル, Furuhashi Shigeru): Sandayu Dokumamushi (毒蝮 三太夫, Dokumamushi Sandayuu)
- Kaji (カジ): Shigeki Kagemaru (影丸 茂樹, Kagemaru Shigeki)
- Sanshirō Shiragane (シラガネ・サンシロウ, Shiragane Sanshirō): Kōji Nanjo (南条 弘二, Nanjo Kōji)
- Masaki Kazamori (カザモリ・マサキ, Kazamori Masaki): Katsuyuki Yamazaki (山崎 勝之, Yamazaki Katsuyuki)
- Keisuke Shima (シマ・ケイスケ, Shima Keisuke): Kunio Masaoka (正岡 邦夫, Masaoka Kunio)
- Takuma Mizuno (ミズノ・タクマ, Mizuno Takuma): Wataru Koga (古賀 亘, Koga Wataru)
- Satomi Hayakawa (ハヤカワ・サトミ, Hayakawa Satomi): Kaoru Ukawa (鵜川 薫, Ukawa Kaoru)
- Rumi Honjō (ホンジョウ・ルミ, Honjō Rumi): Rieko Adachi (あだち 理絵子, Adachi Rieko)
- Takenaka (タケナカ): Kenji Sahara (佐原 健二, Sahara Kenji)

=== Semi-regular cast ===
- Tōgō (トーゴー): Takashi Matsuyama (松山 鷹志, Matsuyama Takashi)
- Risa (リサ): Ami Suzuki (鈴木 亜美, Suzuki Ami)
- TDF Staff Officers (防衛軍参謀, Bōei-gun sanbō): Taro Suwa (諏訪 太朗, Suwa Taro), Tsuyoshi Nakano (中野 剛, Nakano Tsuyoshi), Yoshiteru Yoshida (吉田 吉輝, Yoshida Yoshiteru)
- Inagaki (イナガキ): Masahiro Noguchi (野口 雅弘, Noguchi Masahiro)
- Yuki Kisaragi (キサラギ・ユキ, Kisaragi Yuki): Mika Katsumura (勝村 美香, Katsumura Mika)
- Saijō (サイジョウ): Masaki Nishimori (西守 正樹, Nishimori Masaki)
- Suwa (諏訪): Kyoji Kamui (神威 杏次, Kamui Kyoji)
- Tashiro (タシロ)/Alien Garut (ガルト星人, Garuto Seijin; Voice): Tomokazu Seki (関 智一, Seki Tomokazu)
- Mitsuko (ミツコ): Saori Nara (奈良 沙緒理, Nara Saori)

=== Guest cast ===
1994

- Anne (アンヌ, Annu): Yuriko Hishimi (ひし美 ゆり子, Hishimi Yuriko)
- Special appearances: Hitoshi Takeuchi (竹内 均, Takeuchi Hitoshi), Susumu Kurobe (黒部 進, Kurobe Susumu), Yasuhiko Saijō (西條 康彦, Saijō Yasuhiko), Hiroko Sakurai (桜井 浩子, Sakurai Hiroko), Kenji Sahara, Masanari Nihei (二瓶 正也, Nihei Masanari), Terumi Yoshida (吉田 照美, Yoshida Terumi), Noboru Tsuburaya (円谷 皐, Tsuburaya Noboru)
- Chief Ōtaki (オオタキ主任, Ōtaki Shunin; 2), Commander (指揮官, Shiki-kan): Akitoshi Ōtaki (大滝 明利, Ōtaki Akitoshi)
- Professor Tonezaki (トネザキ教授, Tonezaki-kyōju): Hiroshi Tsuburaya (円谷 浩, Tsuburya Hiroshi)
- Alien Metron (メトロン星人, Metoron Seijin): Kyoji Kamui

1999

- Shinichi Imanari (イマナリ・シンイチ, Imanari Shin'ichi; 1): Shinobu Kameyama (亀山 忍, Kameyama Shinobu)
- Journalist (1): Ichirō Ogura (小倉 一郎, Ogura Ichirō)
- Yoshiya Henmi (辺見 芳哉, Henmi Yoshiya)/Alien Kyuru (キュルウ星人, Kyurū Seijin) (2): Shoichiro Akaboshi (赤星 昇一郎, Akaboshi Shōichirō)
- Ichirō Hayakawa (ハヤカワ・イチロウ, Hayakawa Ichirō): Shirō Namiki (並樹 史郎, Namiki Shirō)
- Mysterious man (2): Akitoshi Ōtaki
- Alien Lemojo "Gale" (レモジョ星系人ゲイル, Remojo Seikeijin Geiru; 3): Kazuoki Takahashi (高橋 和興, Takahashi Kazuoki)
- Urashima Tarō (浦島太郎; 4): Lee Jongho (李ぢょんほ, Ri Jōnho) (young), Kōjirō Kusanagi (草薙幸二郎, Kusanagi Kōjirō) (old)
- Oto-hime (乙姫; 4): Noriko Tanaka (田中 規子, Tanaka Noriko)
- Haruka Kanemitsu (カネミツ・ハルカ, Kanemitsu Haruka; 5): Fumina Hara (原史奈, Hara Fumina)
- Detective Otsuka (大塚刑事, Ōtsuka-keiji; 5): Hiroshi Miyasaka (宮坂ひろし, Miyasaka Hiroshi)
- Mitsugu Ijuuin (伊集院貢, Ijuuin Mitsugu; 6): Kazumasa Seki (瀬木 一将, Seki Kazumasa)
- Nonmalt (ノンマルト, Nonmaruto; 6): Noriko Watanabe (渡辺 典子, Watanabe Noriko)

2002

- Teacher Sayuri (サユリ先生, Sayuri-sensei)/Alien Pegassa (ペガッサ星人, Pegassa Seijin; Voice) (1): Hiroko Sakurai
- Shōko Shiragane (シラガネ・ショウコ, Shiragane Shōko; 2): Michiko Shimazaki (島崎 路子, Shimazaki Michiko)

== Theme song ==
TV Special and 1998 trilogy

- "Ultraseven no Uta" (ウルトラセブンの歌, Urutorasebun no Uta; "The Song of Ultraseven")
  - Lyrics: Kyōichi Azuma (東 京一, Azuma Kyō'ichi)
  - Arrangement & Composition: Tōru Fuyuki (冬木 透, Fuyuki Tōru)
  - Artist: Misuzu Children's Choral Group (みすず児童合唱団, Misuzu Jidō Gasshōdan), The Echoes (ジ・エコーズ, Ji Ekōzu)
  "Version 2" is played as the ending theme.

1999 hexalogy

- Opening: "Ultraseven no Uta 99" (ウルトラセブンの歌99, Urutorasebun no Uta Kyūjūkyū; "The Song of Ultraseven 99")
  - Lyrics: Kyōichi Azuma
  - Arrangement & Composition: Tōru Fuyuki
  - Artist: Isao Sasaki (佐々木 功, Sasaki Isao)
  A remix version is played as the opening of the 2002 Evolution Pentalogy.
- Ending: "Ultraseven no Ballad" (ウルトラセブンのバラード, Urutorasebun no Barādo; "The Ballad of Ultraseven")
  - Arrangement & Composition: Tōru Fuyuki
  - Artist & Lyrics: Isao Sasaki

2002 Evolution Pentalogy

- Ending: ULTRA SEVEN 99
  - Lyrics: Kyōichi Azuma
  - Arrangement & Composition: Tōru Fuyuki
  - Artist: Isao Sasaki
  - Chorus: Shinichi Ishihara (石原 慎一, Ishihara Shin'ichi), Naoto Fuuga (風雅 なおと, Fūga Naoto), Nagato Fuchigami (淵上 祥人, Fuchigami Nagato)
