= Tsuburaya (disambiguation) =

Eiji Tsuburaya (1901–1970) was a Japanese special effects director and cinematographer.

Tsuburaya may also refer to:

- Hajime Tsuburaya, Japanese film director, producer, and cinematographer
- Noboru Tsuburaya, Japanese film producer
- Akira Tsuburaya, Japanese film producer
- Hiroshi Tsuburaya, Japanese actor, a grandchild of Eiji Tsuburaya
- Kazuo Tsuburaya, Japanese film producer, a grandchild of Eiji Tsuburaya
- Yūko Tsuburaya, Japanese actress, a grandchild of Eiji Tsuburaya
- Kōkichi Tsuburaya, Japanese athlete
- Tsuburaya Productions, a Japanese special effects studio founded by Eiji Tsuburaya
