= Noboru Tsuburaya =

Japanese film producer (1935–1995)

- 円谷 皐
- Born: May 10, 1935; Tokyo, Japan
- Died: June 11, 1995 (aged 60); Japan
- Occupation(s): Film producer, president of Tsuburaya Productions
- Years active: 1969–1994
- Spouse: Tomoko
- Children: Kazuo
- Parents: Eiji Tsuburaya (father); Masano Araki (mother)
- Relatives: Hajime (older brother); Akira (younger brother); Hiroshi (nephew)

Noboru Tsuburaya (Japanese: 円谷 皐, Hepburn: Tsuburaya Noboru; May 10, 1935 – June 11, 1995), writing under the pseudonym Noboru Tani (谷のぼる, Tani Noboru), was a Japanese film producer and the third president of Tsuburaya Productions.

== Tsuburaya Productions ==
After the sudden death of his brother Hajime, in 1973, Noboru became president of Tsuburaya Productions until 1994.

== Filmography ==
=== Producer ===
- Ultraman, Ultraseven: Great Violent Monster Fight (1969)
- The 6 Ultra Brothers vs. the Monster Army (1974)
- The Last Dinosaur (1977)
- Ultraman (1979)
- Ultraman: Great Monster Decisive Battle (1979)
- Ultraman Kids: M7.8 Sei no Yukai na Nakama (1984)
- Ultraman Zoffy: Ultra Warriors vs. the Giant Monster Army (1984)
- Ultraman Story (1984)
- Anime Chan (1984)
- Ultraman: The Adventure Begins (1987)
- Ultraman G (1990)
- Skyscraper Hunting (1991)
- Shōrishatachi (1992)
- Ultraman vs. Kamen Rider (1993)
- Superhuman Samurai Syber-Squad (1994)
