= Kazuho Mitsuta =

Japanese film director

- 満田 かずほ
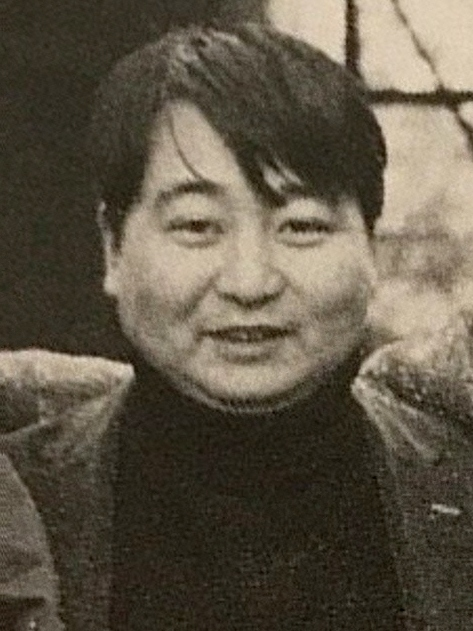
- Mitsuta in 1967
- Born: August 20, 1937 (age 88); Nagasaki, Nagasaki, Japan
- Occupation(s): Director, producer, planner
- Years active: 1964–1997
- Children: 1

Kazuho Mitsuta (Japanese: 満田 かずほ, Hepburn: Mitsuta Kazuho; August 20, 1937), also known by the name Kazuho Kiyose (清瀬かずほ, Kiyose Kazuho), is a Japanese film and television director and producer. He is one of several people who have been given credit for creating Ultraman.

== Career ==
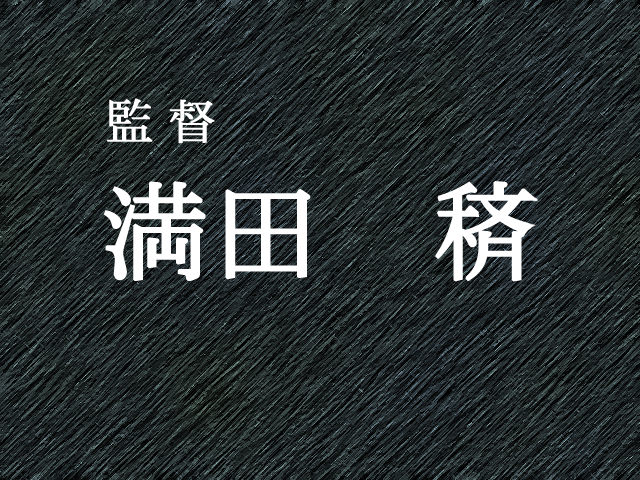
Correct spelling of his name in Japanese Hanja

After working as an assistant director at TBS, he joined Tsuburaya Productions in 1964. His first directed work was the 21 episode of Ultra Q, "Space Directive M774". He has directed and produced many works of Tsuburaya Productions including the original Ultraman series. In Ultraseven, he was selected for the final production. In addition, he also showed his musical and acoustic skills by effectively using the insert song "ULTRASEVEN" and the candidate song for the theme song (commonly known as "Ultra Seven Song Part II") that was rejected, and by performing the announcement of "Fourth Gate, Open!" that resonates in the base in the launching scene of Ultra Hawk 1.

== Filmography ==
=== Director ===
- Ultra Q (1966)
- Kaiju Booska (1966)
- Ultraman (1966)
- Ultraseven (1967)
- Operation: Mystery! (1968)
- Mighty Jack (1968)

=== Assistant director ===
- Ultra Q (1966)

=== Producer ===
- Daigoro vs. Goliath (1972)

=== Production manager ===
- Ultra Fight (1970)

=== Planner ===
- Ultraman Cosmos: The First Contact (2001)

=== Actor ===
- Ultra Q (1966) as Policeman [episode 12] (uncredited)
- Ultraman Cosmos vs. Ultraman Justice: The Final Battle (2003) as SRC China Representative
- Ultraman Max (2006) as Director of UNBALANCE [episode 29]
- Superior Ultraman 8 Brothers (2008) as Hawaiian Restaurant Customer (uncredited)

=== Interviewee ===
- Japanorama (2002)
