= Masanari Nihei =

Japanese actor (1940–2021)

- Born: Masanari Nihei; 9 December 1940; Tokyo, Japan
- Died: 21 August 2021 (aged 80)
- Occupation: Actor

Masanari Nihei (二瓶 正也, Nihei Masanari; 9 December 1940 – 21 August 2021) was a Japanese actor. He played Mitsuhiro Ide in Ultraman, having won the role when originally cast actor Susumu Ishikawa left the production.

== Death ==
Masanari Nihei died on 21 August 2021 due to aspiration pneumonia. His funeral was held privately by his close relatives.

== Selected filmography ==
=== Film ===
- Kane-dukuri taikô-ki (1960)
- Ankokugai no dankon (1961)
- Nasake muyo no wana (1961)
- As a Wife, As a Woman (1961)
- Nakito gozansu (1961)
- Mothra (1961) - Dam Policeman / Infant Island Islander (uncredited)
- Witness Killed (1961)
- Gorath (1962) - Itô - Astronaut of Ôtori
- Dobunezumi sakusen (1962)
- Nihon ichi no wakadaishô (1962)
- Gekkyû dorobo (1962)
- Sengoku yarô (1963)
- Chintao yôsai bakugeki meirei (1963)
- Ichi ka bachi ka (1963)
- Ringo no hana saku machi (1963) - Takuya Igarashi
- The Lost World of Sinbad (1963) - Rebel
- Eburi manshi no yûga-na seikatsu (1963)
- Kyô mo ware ôzora ni ari (1964)
- Aa bakudan (1964) - Tatsumi
- Nippon ichi no horafuki otoko (1964) - Construction Worker
- Kokusai himitsu keisatsu: Kayaku no taru (1964) - Seinen Miyaji
- Hana no oedo no musekinin (1964)
- Samurai Assassin (1965) - Ronin
- Nippon ichi no goma suri otoko (1965)
- Taiheiyô kiseki no sakusen: Kisuka (1965)
- Senjo ni nagareru uta (1965)
- Kureji no daiboken (1965)
- Ereki no Wakadaishō (1965) - Nishina / The Drummer of The Young Beats
- Onna no naka ni iru tanin (1966)
- Nippon ichi no gorigan otoko (1966)
- Kureji da yo: kisôtengai (1966) - Yokota
- Kureji daisakusen (1966)
- The Age of Assassins (1967) - Pappy
- Ultraman (1968) - Mitsuhiro Ide
- Nippon ichi no danzetsu otoko (1969)
- Kiki kaikai ore wa dareda?! (1969) - Henchman
- Hangyaku no Melody (1970)
- Dodesukaden (1970) - 4th Man calling out
- Nippon ichi no warunori otoko (1970)
- Nippon ichi no shokku otoko (1971)
- A Man′s World (1971) - Aoki
- Nippon sanjûshi: Osaraba Tokyo no maki (1972) - Gen-san
- Isoge! Wakamono (1974) - Matsuo
- Shirauo (1977)
- Kochira Katsushika-ku Kameari kôen mae hashutsujo (1977)
- Hakunetsu Dead Heat (1977)
- Dainamaito don don (1978) - Inukai
- Ultraman: Great Monster Decisive Battle (1979) - Mitsuhiro Ide
- Ultraman (1979) - Mitsuhiro Ide
- Disciples of Hippocrates (1980) - Reporter
- Haithîn bugi (1982)
- Arashi o yobu otoko (1983) - Club manager
- Aitsu to lullaby (1983) - Takimoto
- Fireflies in the North (1984) - Tomosaburo Kumagai
- Usugeshô (1985)
- Ultraman Zearth (1996) - Photographer
- Revive! Ultraman (1996, Short) - Mitsuhiro Ide (archive footage)
- Ultraman Zearth 2 (1997) - Photographer
- Ultraman Cosmos: The First Contact (2001)
- Superior Ultraman 8 Brothers (2008) - Owner of Cheep Candy Shop (final film role)

=== Television ===
- Ultra Q (1966; episodes 2, 6, and 15) - Nakamatsu's Assistant / Bank-Robber Gang Sato / The Man who Delivers Milk
- Ultraman (1966) - Mitsuhiro Ide
- Ultra Seven (1968, episode 42) - Masaya
- Mighty Jack (1968) - Akira Genda
- The Ultraman (1979-1980) - Hiroaki Tobe (voice)
- Tokkei Winspector (1990, episode 8) - Daizou Oomagari Gen'ichi Yonekura
- Sōrito Yobanaide (1997) - SP
- Ultraman Max (2006) - Dr. Date
