= Ultraman: Monster Movie Feature =

1967 film directed by Hajime Tsuburaya

- Directed by: Hajime Tsuburaya
- Written by: Tetsuo Kinjō; Shinichi Sekizawa; Shōzō Uehara; Bunzō Wakatsuki
- Produced by: Toshiaki Ichikawa; Masayoshi Sueyasu; Eiji Tsuburaya
- Starring: Susumu Kurobe; Akiji Kobayashi; Sandayū Dokumamushi; Masanari Nihei; Hiroko Sakurai; Akihiko Hirata
- Cinematography: Masaharu Utsumi
- Music by: Kunio Miyauchi
- Production company: Tsuburaya Productions
- Distributed by: Toho Co., Ltd.
- Release date: July 22, 1967 (Japan)
- Running time: 79 minutes
- Country: Japan
- Language: Japanese
- Box office: ¥200 million (Tokyo) (Note: Roughly $550,000 unadjusted for inflation.)

Ultraman: Monster Movie Feature (長篇怪獣映画 ウルトラマン, Chōhen Kaijū Eiga Urutoraman) (Note: Also known as simply Ultraman (ウルトラマン, Urutoraman).) is a 1967 Japanese superhero kaiju film directed by Hajime Tsuburaya, with special effects by Koichi Takano. Produced by Tsuburaya Productions and distributed by Toho Co., Ltd., it is the first film in the Ultraman franchise, consisting entirely of re-edited material from the original series. In the film, an extraterrestrial defends Earth from giant monsters who pose a threat to humanity.

Ultraman: Monster Movie Feature was released theatrically in Japan on July 22, 1967, where it was distributed by Toho as double feature with their film King Kong Escapes, which was less popular among Japanese children upon its release. During its theatrical run, it grossed ¥200 million in just three theaters in Tokyo.

== Cast ==
- Susumu Kurobe as Shin Hayata
- Akiji Kobayashi as Captain Toshio Muramatsu
- Sandayū Dokumamushi as Daisuke Arashi
- Masanari Nihei as Mitsuhiro Ide
- Hiroko Sakurai as Akiko Fuji
- Akihiko Hirata as Professor Iwamoto
- Kōzō Watanabe as Saitama Policeman
- Asao Matsumoto as Matsui
- Kōtarō Tomita as Professor Nakatani
- Rinsaku Ogata as Yoshimura
- Yukio Kawamata as Policeman
- Chiharu Inayoshi as Osamu Suzuki
- Hiroshi Miyata as Mihara Suzuki
- Yukie Nunoji as Rieko Suzuki
- Tsutomu Kato as Takeshi
- Masaaki Umemoto as Tatara Weather Service Employee
- Shinya Kashima as Central Meteorological Observatory Staff
- Bin Furuya as Ultraman
- Teruo Aragaki as Bemular/Red King
- Yukihiro Seino as Chandlar
- Umenosuke Izumi as Magular
- Shuji Fujita as Pigmon
- Kunio Suzuki as Gomora

== Production ==
Ultraman: Monster Movie Feature was edited from episodes 1, 8, 26, and 27 of the television series Ultraman originally broadcast on the Japanese television station TBS from 1966 to 1967. The episodes were blown up to 35mm from their 16mm original television prints.

== Release ==
=== Marketing ===
Since the majority of television-owning Japanese households had black-and-white televisions at the time of Ultraman's broadcast on TBS, the film was marketed as a color production to encourage children to watch it.

=== Theatrical ===
Ultraman: Monster Movie Feature was released theatrically in Japan on July 22, 1967, where it was distributed by Toho as double feature with King Kong Escapes, which was less popular among Japanese children upon its release. During its theatrical run, it grossed ¥200 million in just three theaters in Tokyo. The film has never been released in the United States.

=== Home media ===
In 2006, Avex Trax released the film on DVD. The film was included along with 5 other theatrical Ultraman films on a 9-disc box set released by Tsuburaya Productions on April 7, 2011, in celebration of their 45th anniversary.

=== Critical response ===
On review aggregator Filmarks, the film has an average rating of 3.2/5 based on 229 reviews.
