= Ultraman Zoffy: Ultra Warriors vs. the Giant Monster Army =

- Directed by: Kōichi Takano
- Produced by: Noboru Tsuburaya; Yotaka Udawaki
- Starring: Hikaru Urano
- Cinematography: Shin'ichi Ooka
- Edited by: Mitsumasa Kobayashi
- Music by: Kunio Miyauchi; Toru Fuyuki
- Production company: Tsuburaya Productions
- Distributed by: Shochiku Fuji
- Release date: March 17, 1984 (Japan)
- Running time: 85 minutes
- Country: Japan
- Language: Japanese
- Box office: ¥155 million (Japan)

Ultraman Zoffy: Ultra Warriors vs. the Giant Monster Army (Japanese: ウルトラの戦士VS大怪獣軍団 ウルトラマン ゾフィー ZOFFY, Hepburn: Urutoraman Zofī Urutora no Senshi VS Daikaijū Gundan) is a 1984 Japanese kaiju superhero film produced by Tsuburaya Productions and directed by Kōichi Takano.

== Ultras ==
- Zoffy
- Ultraman
- Ultraseven
- Jack
- Ace
- Taro
- Leo
- Astra
- Joneus
- Mother of Ultra
- Father of Ultra

== Kaijus ==
- King Joe
- Zumbolar
- Crazygon
- Guigass
- Dorako
- Red King
- Pagos
- Pegulia
- Kemur
- Ragon
- Geronimon
- Pigmon
- Garamon
- Kanegon
- Mongula
- M1
- Gango
- Zetton
- Litter
- Garon
- Plazma
- Minazma
- Imitation Astra
- Alien Babarue
- Alien Pedan
- Alien Guts
- Black King
- Alien Nackle
- Baraba
- Aribunta
- Guironian
- Birdon
- Mururoa
- Alien Temperor
- Alien Baltan

== Cast ==
- Hikaru Urano (浦野光): Zoffy
- Kenyū Horiuchi (堀内賢雄)
- Shinya Ōtaki (大滝進矢)
- Masahiru Sakuramoto (桜本昌弘)
- Yōko Kuri (栗葉子)
- Sumiko Shirakawa (白川澄子)
- Ichirō Furutachi (古舘伊知郎): Announcer
