= Hajime Tsuburaya =

Japanese film director (1931–1973)

- 円谷 一
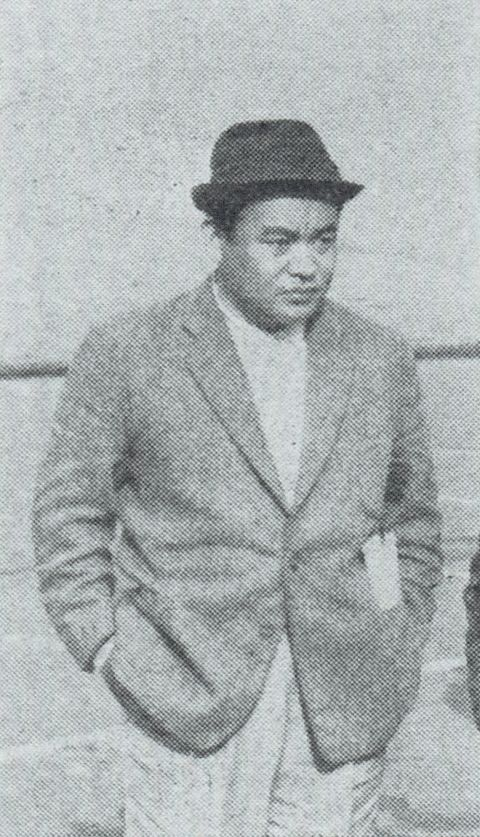
- Tsuburaya in 1962
- Born: April 28, 1931 (Note: Some sources have cited Tsuburaya's birthdate as being on April 23.); Tokyo, Japan
- Died: February 9, 1973 (aged 41); Tokyo, Japan
- Occupations: Director, screenwriter producer, cinematographer, lyricist, president of Tsuburaya Productions
- Years active: 1954–1973
- Children: 3, including Hiroshi
- Parents: Eiji Tsuburaya (father); Masano Araki (mother)
- Relatives: Noboru and Akira (younger brothers)

Hajime Tsuburaya (Japanese: 円谷 一, Hepburn: Tsuburaya Hajime; April 28, 1931 – February 9, 1973) was a Japanese film and television director, producer, and cinematographer. The eldest son of Eiji Tsuburaya, he began his career on the 1954 film, Godzilla and its sequel, Godzilla Raids Again as an assistant special effects cinematographer.

== Early career ==
In 1959, Tsuburaya joined TBS Television as a production director.

== Tsuburaya Productions ==
In 1970, Tsuburaya left TBS due to the death of his father and became president of Tsuburaya Productions. Having financial difficulties, the company was in a critical business situation. Declaring he couldn't serve as president and director at the same time, he became a producer. As a producer in 1970, he produced Ultra Fight. This popularity led to the demand for full-scale special effects programs in 1971 when he produced Return of Ultraman and Mirrorman, bringing about a second giant boom.

== Partial filmography ==
=== Director ===
- Kemuri no Osama (1962)
- Ultra Q (1965)
- Ultraman (1966)
- Ultraman (1967)
- Ultra Seven (1967)
- Operation: Mystery! (1968)

=== Lyricist ===
- Return of Ultraman (1971) - "Return of Ultraman" / "Kaiju Ondo" [as Kyoichi Azuma]
- Mirrorman (1971) - "Song of Mirrorman" / "Song of SGM" / "Fight! Mirrorman" [as Kyoichi Azuma]

=== Assistant director ===
- Cartero Carlos Fly to Japan (1963)

=== Special effects director ===
- Ultraman (1966)

=== Producer ===
- Ultra Fight (1970)
- Return of Ultraman (1971)
- Mirrorman (1971)
- Daigoro vs. Goliath (1972)

=== Assistant special effects cinematographer ===
- Godzilla (1954) [with various]
- Godzilla Raids Again (1955) [with various]

=== Interviewee ===
- The Father of Ultra Q (1966)

== Notes ==
Preceded by Eiji Tsuburaya	President of Tsuburaya Productions; 1969–1973	Succeeded by Noboru Tsuburaya
