= Ultraman vs. Kamen Rider =

1993 Japanese television special

- Country of origin: Japan
- Original language: Japanese

Ultraman vs. Kamen Rider (ウルトラマンVS仮面ライダー, Urutoraman tai Kamen Raidā) is a crossover superhero television special that aired on July 21, 1993 which was originally made to commemorate the 25th anniversary of the Ultra Series and the 20th anniversary of the Kamen Rider Series, featuring clips from the various series from over the years, interviews with two of the stars, and finally a team-up between Tsuburaya Productions' Ultraman and Toei Company's Kamen Rider. It was also released on VHS and Laserdisc in 1993. In 2011, Ultraman vs. Kamen Rider was re-released on Blu-ray and DVD for the 45th anniversary of the Ultra Series and the 40th anniversary of the Kamen Rider Series.

== Plot ==
The special is an in-depth retrospective of the two franchises, making comparisons between the different characters, their weapons, powers and so forth. Segments include:

- “The Spacium Ray Vs. The Rider Kick”, which showcases the various attacks and finishing moves of each character.
- “Jet VTOL Vs. Cyclone”, which spotlights the many jets, tanks and other vehicles used in the Ultra Series, and the different motorcycles ridden by the Kamen Riders.
- “Kaiju Vs. Kaijin”, in which the many giant monsters (kaiju), and humanoid monsters (kaijin) that have been fought over the years are shown.
- "Henshin Vs. Henshin" shows the different transformation rituals of the Ultra Brothers and Kamen Riders.
- "!?" is a humorous segment examining some of the more wacky and oddball moments of the various shows. (such as various Kaijin grunts, growls, and other sounds, characters acting silly, and other funny moments.)

Interspersed among the many clips are interviews with Hiroshi Miyauchi, who played Shiro Kazami in Kamen Rider V3, and Kohji Moritsugu who played Dan Moroboshi in Ultraseven.

The final segment of the special is a short film titled "Super Battle: Ultraman vs Kamen Rider". The main characters, Ultraman and Kamen Rider 1 appear on the scene separately, each fighting an original kaijin and kaiju, Gadoras and Poison Scorpion Man respectively. When the two monsters are nearly defeated, they merge into a more powerful kaiju; Sasori Gadoras. Ultraman experiences trouble and calls for Kamen Rider 1's help. Kamen Rider 1 is then able to grow to an enormous size to fight alongside Ultraman. Combining their powers, the duo are able to successfully destroy the monster.

== Production ==
The short, with the exception of the narrator and some background extras, featured no face or voice actors, only suit actors, and only used recycled soundbytes for both the voices of Ultraman and Kamen Rider 1.

=== Staff ===
- Producer: Hiroshi Butsuda (佛田洋, Butsuda Hiroshi)
- Suit actors
  - Ultraman: Toshiyuki Kikuchi (菊地寿幸, Kikuchi Toshiyuki)
  - Kamen Rider 1: Hiroshi Maeda (前田浩, Maeda Hiroshi)
  - Poison Scorpion Man (Kaijin), Gadoras (Kaiju), Sasori Gadoras (Combined Form): Takeshi Miyazaki (宮崎剛, Miyazaki Takeshi)

== Music ==
Theme song

- "Tatakau Tame ni Umareta Senshi" (戦うために生まれた戦士; The Soldier Born to Fight)
  - Lyrics: Hirō Takada (高田ひろお, Takada Hirō)
  - Composition: Asei Kobayashi (小林亜星, Kobayashi Asei)
  - Arrangement: Takeo Suzuki (鈴木武生, Suzuki Takeo)
  - Singer: Hironobu Kageyama (影山ヒロノブ, Kageyama Hironobu)

== Home media ==
After having been unavailable for years, after the initial 1993 Laserdisc and VHS releases, it was announced in a press conference held on June 24, 2011 at the offices of Bandai that the special would be released on both DVD and Blu-ray on October 26, 2011. This was to celebrate the 45th anniversary of Ultraman, and the 40th anniversary of Kamen Rider. To be included with the release was a special interview with Susumu Kurobe who played Shin Hayata (Ultraman), and Hiroshi Fujioka who played Takeshi Hongo (Kamen Rider #1).
