= Hiroshi Tsuburaya =

Japanese actor (1964–2001)

- 円谷 浩
- Born: March 8, 1964; Setagaya, Tokyo, Japan
- Died: July 24, 2001 (aged 37); Tokyo, Japan
- Occupation: Actor
- Years active: 1982–2000
- Father: Hajime Tsuburaya
- Relatives: Aōdō Denzen (ancestor); Eiji (grandfather); Masano Araki (grandmother); Noboru (uncle); Akira (uncle)

Hiroshi Tsuburaya (円谷 浩, Tsuburaya Hiroshi; March 8, 1964 – July 24, 2001) was a Japanese actor. The grandchild of Eiji Tsuburaya, who was also the first creator of the Ultraman Series, and the third son of Hajime Tsuburaya who became the second creator of the Ultraman Series after Eiji Tsuburaya's death on January 25, 1970. He was born in Setagaya, Tokyo. He became known to tokusatsu series audiences for playing the leading role in Uchuu Keiji Shaider (Space Sheriff Shaider) as Dai Sawamura/Shaider.

== Death ==
Tsuburaya died of liver cancer on July 24, 2001, due to alcoholism developed through the years. He was 37 years old. His best friends, actors Hiroshi Watari who played the title role in Sharivan and Spielvan, and Kenji Ohba, who played the title role in Space Sheriff Gavan, attended his funeral.

== Movies ==
- Ultra Q The Movie: Legend of the Stars
- Ultraman Tiga & Ultraman Dyna: Warriors of the Star of Light

== TV ==
- Uchuu Keiji Shaider (1984)
- Sanada Taiheiki (1985–86), Toyotomi Hideyori
- Ultra Seven - The Ground of the Earthlings (1994)
- Ultraman Tiga (1996)
- Ultraman Dyna (1997)
- Ultraman Gaia (1998)
