= Ultraman Tiga & Ultraman Dyna: New Generations =

1998 video game

- Developer: Bandai
- Publisher: Bandai
- Series: Ultraman Tiga; Ultraman Dyna
- Platform: PlayStation
- Release: JP: 1998
- Genre: Fighting

Ultraman Tiga & Ultraman Dyna: New Generations is a video game spinoff of the Ultraman Tiga and Ultraman Dyna TV series, published only in Japan in 1998 by Bandai for the Sony PlayStation. It bears little relation to the film Ultraman Tiga & Ultraman Dyna: Warriors of the Planet of Light, though it does match up with some parts of the Ultraman Tiga and Ultraman Dyna series. It is more like Ultraman Fighting Evolution, being an arcade-style fighter (keep going until you run out of credits), and as such, it is often mistakenly included in the series.
