= Ultraseven =

Japanese television series

- Also known as: Ultra–7

Japanese name
- Katakana: ウルトラセブン
Transcriptions
- Revised Hepburn: Urutora Sebun
- Genre: Tokusatsu; Science fiction; Kaiju; Superhero
- Written by: Tetsuo Kinjo (head)
- Starring: Kohji Moritsugu; Shōji Nakayama; Yuriko Hishimi; Sandayū Dokumamushi; Bin Furuya; Shinsuke Achiha
- Music by: Tōru Fuyuki
- Country of origin: Japan
- Original language: Japanese
- No. of episodes: 49

Production
- Producers: Masami Sueyasu; Toshimichi Miwa (TBS); Yoji Hashimoto (TBS)
- Running time: 24 minutes
- Production companies: Tsuburaya Productions; TBS

Original release
- Network: JNN (TBS)
- Release: October 1, 1967 – September 8, 1968

Related
- Ultraman; Return of Ultraman

Ultraseven (ウルトラセブン, Urutora Sebun) is a Japanese tokusatsu science fiction television series created by Eiji Tsuburaya. It is the second entry (third overall) in the Ultra Series and was produced by Tsuburaya Productions. The series aired on Tokyo Broadcasting System from October 1, 1967 to September 8, 1968.

== Premise ==
In the not-too-distant future, Earth finds itself constantly under attack from extraterrestrial threats. To combat them, the Terrestrial Defense Force establishes the Ultra Garrison, a team of six elite members who utilize high-tech vehicles and weaponry. Joining their fight is the mysterious Dan Moroboshi who is secretly an alien from the Land of Light in Nebula M-78 and transforms into his true alien form, Ultraseven, in times of crisis.

== Production ==
After the success of space-themed science fiction shows such as Ultraman, Captain Ultra, and the Japanese broadcast of Lost in Space, Tokyo Broadcasting System pursued Tsuburaya Productions to produce another sci-fi series. This led Eiji Tsuburaya to assemble Hajime Tsuburaya, Akio Jissoji, Tetsuo Kinjo, Masami Sueyasu, and Shoji Otomo to brainstorm ideas.

Eiji Tsuburaya proposed a series that would have been a hybrid of Thunderbirds and Lost in Space, Hajime proposed a new Ultraman series that would have included network and sponsors' input for each season, Jissoji proposed a time-travel themed show which would have focused on a time patrol team and their families, Kinjo proposed a children's horror/mystery show that would have been a hybrid of Ultra Q and The Twilight Zone, Sueyasu proposed a fairy tale-themed series, and Otomo proposed a space-themed series which would have been a cross of Lost in Space and Men into Space featuring giant monsters.

TBS eventually settled on a fusion of Eiji's and Otomo's ideas and Eiji submitted a treatment titled The Ultra Garrison, which featured six trained astronauts (including an android named "John") stationed on a satellite called "Mother", the first line of defense against alien invaders. Kinjo felt that the idea was lacking an essential element and suggested adding a superhero.

The treatment underwent massive revisions after TBS felt the idea was too similar to The Great Space War and the new version included giant monsters while retaining the original Earth Defense Force element at TBS' request. TBS eventually suggested to make the series a direct sequel to Ultraman and have it focused on Hayata and Fuji's son, who would be able to call upon Earth monsters for help and only transform into Ultraman in times of desperation.

Tetsuo Kinjo began working on an outline, combining elements of TBS' best ideas and his own, such as elements from his rejected proposal WoO, which featured an alien unwittingly becoming a savior of mankind. Kinjo's outline was titled Ultra Eye and featured Dan Moroboshi being the son of a human and an alien, with Dan coming to Earth in search of his mother. This version also featured Capsule Monsters that Dan would have used when he could not transform. Originally, monsters from Ultra Q and Ultraman were going to be used as the Capsule Monsters in order to cut down production costs.

Ultraseven battles Narse in episode 11: Fly to Devil Mountain.

Tohru Narita was assigned to design the aliens, monsters, and vehicles. Narita's design for Ultraseven was inspired by Mayan culture and originally chose silver and blue for the colors, but changed them to silver and red to avoid problems with the blue-screen matte process. Principal photography on the special effects began in May 1967 and casting began in June 1967. Many of the actors hired were chosen from Toho's acting pool, since the studio was one of the financial investors for Tsuburaya Productions. Yoji Hashimoto and Toshimichi Miwa were put in charge of duties with TBS for the show, while Eiji Tsuburaya served as the chief producer and supervisor for the show and Masami Sueyasu reprised his role as a hands-on producer for Tsuburaya Productions.

Four episodes were completed before copyright was approved for the show's title, which was changed to Ultraseven. The show was filmed silent, a common practice for Japanese shows at the time, and post-production, including editing and voice dubbing, began in September 1967. Toru Fuyuki was hired to compose the soundtrack, gearing towards a more classical direction as opposed to the jazz-inspired direction Kunio Miyauchi took for the Ultraman soundtrack.

Ultraseven aired on October 1, 1967 and earned a 33.7% rating, an achievement at the time. Due to the show's high ratings, TBS ordered an additional 10 episodes during preparations for the show's third Cours (episodes 27-39). Despite ratings dropping during the final weeks, Ultraseven still remained in the top five highest rated shows in Japanese television at the time.

Sequels for both Ultraman, titled Ultraman Continues, and Ultraseven, titled Fight! Ultraseven, were proposed, but Tsuburaya Productions would not produce another Ultra series until 1971, with Return of Ultraman.

== Cast ==
- Kohji Moritsugu as Dan Moroboshi/Ultraseven: Spelled as "Dan Moroboshe" in the Cinar English dub. Ultraseven borrows the look of Jiroh Satsuma and transforms into his true alien form using the Ultra Eye ("Task Mask" in the Cinar dub). At the time of the show's production, Moritsugu was married and poor. This was kept secret in order to publicize Moritsugu as a rising young heartthrob.
- Shōji Nakayama as Captain Kaoru Kiriyama: The captain of the Ultra Garrison.
- Sandayū Dokumamushi as Shigeru Furuhashi: The rotund, strong and trigger-happy member of the Ultra Garrison.
- Yuriko Hishimi as Anne Yuri: Known as "Donna" in the Cinar dub. The team's communications operator and nurse. Yoshiko Toyoura was originally cast in the role, but was pulled out by director Takashi Tsuboshima to cast her in his then-latest film. Hishimi was given the role after doing an immediate audition and photo shoot.
- Shinsuke Achiha as Soga: The Ultra Garrison's expert marksman.
- Bin Furuya as Amagi: The team's strategist. Furuya had been the suit performer for Ultraman in the preceding series and stated that, although he liked being Ultraman, Amagi was more enjoyable due to having an exposed appearance.
- Koji Uenishi as Ultraseven (suit performer): Uenishi portrayed Ultraseven for the entire series while Eiichi Kikuchi did the suit performance for episodes 14 and 15.

== Episodes ==
No.	Title	Directed by	Written by	Original release date
1	"The Invisible Challenger"; Transliteration: "Sugata Naki Chōsensha" (Japanese: 姿なき挑戦者)	Hajime Tsuburaya	Tetsuo Kinjo	October 1, 1967
2	"The Green Terror"; Transliteration: "Midori no Kyōfu" (Japanese: 緑の恐怖)	Samaji Nonagase	Tetsuo Kinjo	October 8, 1967
3	"The Secret of the Lake"; Transliteration: "Mizuumi no Himitsu" (Japanese: 湖のひみつ)	Samaji Nonagase	Tetsuo Kinjo	October 15, 1967
4	"Max, Respond!"; Transliteration: "Makkusu-gō Ōtō Seyo" (Japanese: マックス号応答せよ)	Kazuho Mitsuta	Tetsuo Kinjo & Masahiro Yamada	October 22, 1967
5	"Vanished Time"; Transliteration: "Kesareta Jikan" (Japanese: 消された時間)	Hajime Tsuburaya	Akihiko Sugano	October 29, 1967
6	"Dark Zone"; Transliteration: "Dāku Zōn" (Japanese: ダーク・ゾーン)	Kazuho Mitsuta	Bunzo Wakatsuki	November 5, 1967
7	"Space Prisoner 303"; Transliteration: "Uchū Shūjin San Maru San" (Japanese: 宇宙囚人303)	Toshitsugu Suzuki	Tetsuo Kinjo	November 12, 1967
8	"The Marked Town"; Transliteration: "Nerawareta Machi" (Japanese: 狙われた街)	Akio Jissoji	Tetsuo Kinjo	November 19, 1967
9	"Operation Android Zero"; Transliteration: "Andoroido Zero Shirei" (Japanese: アンドロイド0指令)	Kazuho Mitsuta	Shozo Uehara	November 26, 1967
10	"The Suspicious Neighbor"; Transliteration: "Ayashii Rinjin" (Japanese: 怪しい隣人)	Toshitsugu Suzuki	Bunzo Wakatsuki	December 3, 1967
11	"Fly to Devil Mountain"; Transliteration: "Ma no Yama e Tobe" (Japanese: 魔の山へ飛べ)	Kazuho Mitsuta	Tetsuo Kinjo	December 10, 1967
12	"From Another Planet with Love"; Transliteration: "Yūsei yori Ai o Komete" (Japanese: 遊星より愛をこめて)	Akio Jissoji	Mamoru Sasaki	December 17, 1967
13	"The Man Who Came from V3"; Transliteration: "Bui Surī kara Kita Otoko" (Japanese: V3から来た男)	Toshitsugu Suzuki	Shinichi Ichikawa	December 24, 1967
14	"The Ultra Guard Goes West: Part 1"; Transliteration: "Urutora Keibitai Nishi e Zenpen" (Japanese: ウルトラ警備隊西へ 前編)	Kazuho Mitsuta	Tetsuo Kinjo	January 7, 1968
15	"The Ultra Guard Goes West: Part 2"; Transliteration: "Urutora Keibitai Nishi e Kōhen" (Japanese: ウルトラ警備隊西へ 後編)	Kazuho Mitsuta	Tetsuo Kinjo	January 14, 1968
16	"The Eye That Shines in the Darkness"; Transliteration: "Yami ni Hikaru Me" (Japanese: 闇に光る目)	Toshitsugu Suzuki	Keisuke Fujikawa	January 21, 1968
17	"Underground Go! Go! Go!"; Transliteration: "Chitei Gō! Gō! Gō!" (Japanese: 地底GO! GO! GO!)	Hajime Tsuburaya	Shozo Uehara	January 28, 1968
18	"Escape Dimension X"; Transliteration: "Kūkan Ekkusu Dasshutsu" (Japanese: 空間X脱出)	Hajime Tsuburaya	Tetsuo Kinjo	February 4, 1968
19	"Project Blue"; Transliteration: "Purojekuto Burū" (Japanese: プロジェクト・ブルー)	Samaji Nonagase	Ryu Minamikawa	February 11, 1968
20	"Destroy Earthquake Epicenter X"; Transliteration: "Jishingen Ekkusu o Taose" (Japanese: 地震源Xを倒せ)	Samaji Nonagase	Bunzo Wakatsuki	February 18, 1968
21	"Pursue the Undersea Base!"; Transliteration: "Kaitei Kichi o Oe" (Japanese: 海底基地を追え)	Toshitsugu Suzuki	Onisuke Akai	February 25, 1968
22	"The Human Farm"; Transliteration: "Ningen Bokujō" (Japanese: 人間牧場)	Toshitsugu Suzuki	Hiroyasu Yamaura	March 3, 1968
23	"Search for Tomorrow"; Transliteration: "Ashita o Sagase" (Japanese: 明日を捜せ)	Samaji Nonagase	Ryu Minamikawa & Shozo Uehara	March 10, 1968
24	"Return to the North!"; Transliteration: "Kita e Kaere!" (Japanese: 北へ還れ!)	Kazuho Mitsuta	Shinichi Ichikawa	March 17, 1968
25	"Showdown at 140 Degrees Below Zero"; Transliteration: "Reika Hyakuyonjū-do no Taiketsu" (Japanese: 零下140度の対決)	Kazuho Mitsuta	Tetsuo Kinjo	March 24, 1968
26	"Super Weapon R-1"; Transliteration: "Chōheiki Āru Ichi-gō" (Japanese: 超兵器R1号)	Toshitsugu Suzuki	Bunzo Wakatsuki	March 31, 1968
27	"Operation: Cyborg"; Transliteration: "Saibōgu Sakusen" (Japanese: サイボーグ作戦)	Toshitsugu Suzuki	Keisuke Fujikawa	April 7, 1968
28	"The 700 Kilometer Run!"; Transliteration: "Nanahyakkiro o Tsuppashire!" (Japanese: 700キロを突っ走れ!)	Kazuho Mitsuta	Shozo Uehara	April 14, 1968
29	"The Earthling All Alone"; Transliteration: "Hitoribotchi no Chikyūjin" (Japanese: ひとりぼっちの地球人)	Kazuho Mitsuta	Shinichi Ichikawa	April 21, 1968
30	"Glory for Whom?"; Transliteration: "Eikō wa Dare no Tame ni" (Japanese: 栄光は誰れのために)	Toshitsugu Suzuki	Keisuke Fujikawa	April 28, 1968
31	"The Flower Where the Devil Dwells"; Transliteration: "Akuma no Sumu Hana" (Japanese: 悪魔の住む花)	Toshitsugu Suzuki	Shozo Uehara	May 5, 1968
32	"The Strolling Planet"; Transliteration: "Sanpo Suru Wakusei" (Japanese: 散歩する惑星)	Samaji Nonagase	Masahiro Yamada & Shozo Uehara	May 12, 1968
33	"The Invading Dead"; Transliteration: "Shinryaku Suru Shisha-tachi" (Japanese: 侵略する死者たち)	Hajime Tsuburaya	Shozo Uehara	May 19, 1968
34	"The Vanishing City"; Transliteration: "Jōhatsu Toshi" (Japanese: 蒸発都市)	Hajime Tsuburaya	Tetsuo Kinjo	May 26, 1968
35	"Terror on the Moon"; Transliteration: "Gessekai no Senritsu" (Japanese: 月世界の戦慄)	Toshitsugu Suzuki	Shinichi Ichikawa	June 2, 1968
36	"A Lethal 0.1 Seconds"; Transliteration: "Hissatsu no Rei-ten-ichi-byō" (Japanese: 必殺の0.1秒)	Samaji Nonagase	Hiroyasu Yamaura	June 9, 1968
37	"The Stolen Ultra Eye"; Transliteration: "Nusumareta Urutora Ai" (Japanese: 盗まれたウルトラ・アイ)	Toshitsugu Suzuki	Shinichi Ichikawa	June 16, 1968
38	"The Courageous Battle"; Transliteration: "Yūki Aru Tatakai" (Japanese: 勇気ある戦い)	Toshihiro Iijima	Mamoru Sasaki	June 23, 1968
39	"The Seven Assassination Plan: Part 1"; Transliteration: "Sebun Ansatsu Keikaku Zenpen" (Japanese: セブン暗殺計画 前篇)	Toshihiro Iijima	Keisuke Fujikawa	June 30, 1968
40	"The Seven Assassination Plan: Part 2"; Transliteration: "Sebun Ansatsu Keikaku Kōhen" (Japanese: セブン暗殺計画 後編)	Toshihiro Iijima	Keisuke Fujikawa	July 7, 1968
41	"Challenge from Underwater"; Transliteration: "Suichū kara no Chōsen" (Japanese: 水中からの挑戦)	Kazuho Mitsuta	Bunzo Wakatsuki	July 14, 1968
42	"Ambassador of the Nonmalt"; Transliteration: "Nonmaruto no Shisha" (Japanese: ノンマルトの使者)	Kazuho Mitsuta	Tetsuo Kinjo	July 21, 1968
43	"Nightmare on Planet No. 4"; Transliteration: "Daiyon Wakusei no Akumu" (Japanese: 第四惑星の悪夢)	Akio Jissoji	Takashi Kawasaki & Shozo Uehara	July 28, 1968
44	"The Terrifying Super Ape-man"; Transliteration: "Kyōfu no Chōenjin" (Japanese: 恐怖の超猿人)	Toshitsugu Suzuki	Shozo Uehara & Shinichi Ichikawa	August 4, 1968
45	"The Saucers Have Come"; Transliteration: "Enban ga Kita" (Japanese: 円盤が来た)	Akio Jissoji	Takashi Kawasaki & Shozo Uehara	August 11, 1968
46	"The Showdown of Dan vs. Seven"; Transliteration: "Dan Tai Sebun no Kettō" (Japanese: ダン対セブンの決闘)	Toshitsugu Suzuki	Shozo Uehara & Shinichi Ichikawa	August 18, 1968
47	"Who Are You?"; Transliteration: "Anata wa Dāre?" (Japanese: あなたはだぁれ?)	Tatsumi Ando	Shozo Uehara	August 25, 1968
48	"The Biggest Invasion in History: Part 1"; Transliteration: "Shijō Saidai no Shinryaku Zenpen" (Japanese: 史上最大の侵略 前編)	Kazuho Mitsuta	Tetsuo Kinjo	September 1, 1968
49	"The Biggest Invasion in History: Part 2"; Transliteration: "Shijō Saidai no Shinryaku Kōhen" (Japanese: 史上最大の侵略 後編)	Kazuho Mitsuta	Tetsuo Kinjo	September 8, 1968

=== Banned episode ===
The 12th episode, titled "From Another Planet with Love", was banned due to Alien Spell (which had keloid scars) being labeled as "Hibaku Seijin" (A-Bomb Survivor Alien) which was lifted from the term "hibakusha", referring to the survivors of the atomic bombings of Hiroshima and Nagasaki. The issue was featured on an article of the Asahi Shimbun newspaper, which sparked public outrage and forced Tsuburaya Productions to change the name to "Kyuketsu Seijin" (Vampire Alien). Despite this, Tsuburaya Productions still received negative public opinion and as a result, Tsuburaya pulled the alien character and episode from official publications, broadcasts and home media releases. However, the Hawaiian English dub and Cinar dub of the series broadcast the episode (which was re-titled "Crystallized Corpuscles") in North America.

== English versions ==
Title card for the Cinar dub

In 1985, Turner Program Services licensed the series in a 15-year contract from Tsuburaya Productions, who provided the English dubbed versions produced in Honolulu by Tsuburaya-Hawaii, Inc. in the mid-1970s. Finding this English version to be lacking, Turner commissioned the Canadian children's programming production house, Cinar, to dub all 49 episodes for run in syndication. The TPS/Cinar produced episodes featured new opening and closing credits, eyecatches, new episode names, and even a change of name for the character of Anne Yuri, who was dubbed as "Donna Michibata". Cinar edited the episodes for violence, language and commercial time and featured new music cues.

Unsatisfied with Cinar's resultant work, Turner put the series into their vaults until 1994, when they were alerted that the episodes were never broadcast. Ultraseven was dusted off for the "Toons 'Til Noon" and "MonsterVision" blocks on TNT. The "Toons 'Til Noon" broadcasts received substantially heavy editing to make them suitable for the time slot, while the "MonsterVision" broadcasts were the full-length Cinar adaptations. Episodes 3 and 5-7 were missing or mislabeled and were never broadcast. Clips from the series were later used in the "Messages from Space" and "Vacation Spots Around the Universe" segments on the animated variety show Cartoon Planet, which aired on TBS and Cartoon Network. When the contract expired in 2001, Turner returned all the materials (film elements, videotapes, audio masters) to Tsuburaya Productions.

== Home media ==
=== Japan ===
Bandai Visual released the series on Blu-ray in Japan as two separate sets with the first released on November 21, 2014 and the second on January 28, 2015. In September 2020, NHK aired 4K remasters of the series, converted from 16 mm film with HDR. In April 2023, Tsuburaya announced that Pony Canyon would release the 4K remasters in an 11-disc box set (containing 4K Blu-ray's with HDR and standard Blu-ray's) on July 7, 2023 to commemorate the 55th anniversary of Ultraseven.

=== North America ===
In December 2012, Shout! Factory released the Japanese version on DVD, licensed from UM Corporation through Tiga Entertainment. In July 2019, Mill Creek Entertainment announced that it had acquired most of the Ultraman library from Tsuburaya Productions through Indigo Entertainment, including 1,100 episodes and 20 films. Mill Creek released the series on Blu-ray and digital on December 10, 2019 in standard and steelbook editions.

In July 2020, Shout! Factory announced to have struck a multi-year deal with Alliance Entertainment and Mill Creek Entertainment, with the blessings of Tsuburaya and Indigo, that granted them the exclusive SVOD and AVOD digital rights to the Ultra series and films (1,100 episodes and 20 films) acquired by Mill Creek the previous year. Ultraseven, amongst other titles, will stream in the United States and Canada through Shout! Factory TV and Tokushoutsu.

== Legacy ==
Pokémon creator Satoshi Tajiri said that the Poké Ball concept was inspired by Ultraseven's Capsule Monsters.

== See also ==
- Prefectural Earth Defense Force
