= Sandayū Dokumamushi =

Japanese actor (born 1936)

Sandayū Dokumamushi (毒蝮 三太夫, Dokumamushi Sandayū) born Iyoshi Ishii (石井 伊吉, Ishii Iyoshi) on 31 March 1936 in Osaka, Japan) is a Japanese actor. He portrayed the role of Daisuke Arashi in the original Ultraman series (1966-1967) and Shigeru Furuhashi in Ultra Seven. He has been a radio personality on the Tokyo Broadcasting System (TBS) since 1969. His radio program is famous for vulgar language and is popular with an older audience.

== Filmography ==
Year	Title	Role	Notes
1966-1967	Ultraman	Daisuke Arashi	39 episodes
1967-1968	Ultra Seven	Shigeru Furuhashi	49 episodes
1967	Waka-shachô: Rainbow Sakusen	Yûichi Hashima	
1968	Chôhen kaijû eiga: Urutoraman	Daisuke Arashi	
1971	Kigeki Ijiwaru Daishôgai		
1973	Otoko wa tsurai yo: Torajiro wasurenagusa		
1976	Kinkin no lumpen taisho	Driver	
1978	Shucchô Toruko: Mata Ikumasu	Dokushima	
1979	Ultraman: Great Monster Decisive Battle	Daisuke Arashi	
1991	Mikadroid: Robokill Beneath Discoclub Layla		
1996	Ultraman Zearth	Reporter	
1997	Ultraman Zearth 2	Reporter	
2004	Tenka	Shinichi Takasugi	Asadora
2005	Ultraman Max	Security Guard	Episode 33
2016	Rudolf the Black Cat	Dump truck driver	Voice
2021	What Happened to Our Nest Egg!?	Kenzō Ōizumi	
2023	Go! Go! Sakura Club		
