= Bio Planet WoO =

- Title card

Bio Planet WoO (生物彗星ＷoO, Seibutsu Suisei Ū) is a Kyodai Hero tokusatsu series produced by Tsuburaya Productions, that premiered April 9, 2006 and aired at 7:30pm on NHK and ran for 13 episodes. WoO was one of many unused ideas created by Eiji Tsuburaya as story connecting to the show Ultra Q. The story revolves around a living creature which came from a comet named WoO; in the series, WoO is befriended by a young girl named Ai; both are chased by a mysterious organization called SWORD who sees WoO as a threat to humanity. At the same time, giant monsters have invaded in search of WoO. The story itself follows the original script Tsuburaya intended for the show. In addition, a manga series was published a year later which was loosely based on the series of the same name.

== Main characters ==
- WoO: The only survivor of his species wandered in space until he crashed on Earth. There, he befriended Ai and develops a strong bond with her that he'd protect her at any cost. He uses his antennae to connect to electronic devices (mainly a cell phone) to communicate with Ai. He can transform into an Ultraman-like giant for battle.
- Ai Kumasiro: Junior high school 2nd grade. She stays with her mother and loves soccer. She travels with WoO after their encounter. Her school is then attacked by a giant monster, which resulted in her being the lone survivor of the attack.
- Kiyomi Kumasiro: Ai's mother and secondary chief editor at the magazine "CHEMISTRY."
- Akita: A reporter of magazine "CHEMISTRY."
- Kotaro: Ai's classmate. After he leaves working in the Convenient Store; his dream is to become a movie director. He seems to be attracted to Ai.

=== SWORD Organization ===
- Yaman: The leader of SWORD. It reveals that his daughter was killed in the incident that Ai survived and because of that holds a personal vendetta against the alien life forms, including WoO.
- Kirishi: Field Agent for SWORD.
- Katsura: Field Researcher for SWORD, she eventually becomes an ally to Ai and WoO helping them escape from her colleagues.
- Sakuraba: Field Agent of SWORD who keeps tabs on Ai and WoO.
- Nagakura: Biological Researcher for SWORD. He uses WoO's artifact and turns into the monster Gelnoide in episodes 12 and 13.
- Gonda: Katsura's sweetheart and ace combat specialist for SWORD's mobile unit. He is portrayed by Shigeki Kagemaru (who played GUTS Member Tetsuo Shinjou in Ultraman Tiga).
- Waver: Head of SWORD's mobile unit and his part of SWORD's US branch in Arizona.

== WoO's Forms ==
- Egg Form: The shape WoO used to travel in space.
- Inflated Form: An expanded version of normal form; WoO grows bigger than Ai, but still fights monsters in its normal form.
- Fossil Form: WoO reverts to this form due to exhaustion fighting as a giant. It takes water to revive him into his normal form.
- Rucksack Form: Due to WoO's shapeshifting abilities, he takes this form when traveling with Ai to disguise himself from public.
- Aikichi Form: A fusion of WoO and Ai's energies resulting in WoO turning into a Giant to fight other daikaiju; after fighting he turns into his Fossil Form.

== Episodes ==
1. He Fell From Outer Space! (あいつが宇宙から落ちてきた！, Aitsu ga Uchū kara Ochite Kita!)
2. I Will Be Killed! (わたし殺される！, Watashi Korosareru!)
3. Hero? Born (ヒーロー？誕生, Hīrō? Tanjō)
4. WoO, Don't Die (ＷｏＯ、死なないで, Wū, Shinanai de)
5. Counterattack Orders (迎撃命令, Geigeki Meirei)
6. Farewell WoO (さよならＷｏＯ, Sayonara Wū)
7. New Terror (新たなる恐怖, Arata Naru Kyōfu)
8. My Whereaboouts (わたしの居場所, Watashi no Ibasho)
9. Cornered (追いつめられて, Oitsumerarete)
10. Sorry, Kotaro (ごめんね、小太郎, Gomen ne, Kotarō)
11. Love For All (ラブ･フォー･オール, Rabu Fō Ōru)
12. The Final Battle (最後の闘い, Saigo no Tatakai)
13. Bonds to the Future (未来への絆, Mirai e no Kizuna)

== Monsters ==
- Gelnake (Episodes 1 & 2)
- Galrobe (Episode 3)
- Gelbelio (Episode 4)
- Gelbile (Episode 5)
- Gelbile MK (Episode 10)
- Gelnoide (Episodes 12 & 13)

== Manga ==
A year after the show ended its run a manga Shoujo series of the same name was published. Compared to the TV show, the manga features elements & traits that differs greatly from the show that the manga was loosely based on. Unlike the TV show, the manga had a more lighthearted feel with a Slice of life style, thus distancing itself from the more Kyodai Hero style series. Because of this, the manga solely focused on the main characters.

== Songs ==
- Opening theme: "Guardian Angel" by Splash Candy
- Ending theme: "Kasa wa Hitotsu de Tariru no Kana…" (傘はひとつで足りるのかな…; "One Umbrella… Is it Enough?") by Girls On The Run (ガールズ・オン・ザ・ラン, Gāruzu On Za Ran)
