= Ultraman (1966 TV series) =

1966 Japanese television series

- Title logo
- Also known as: Ultraman: A Special Effects Fantasy Series

Japanese name
- Kanji: ウルトラマン
Transcriptions
- Revised Hepburn: Urutoraman
- Genre: Tokusatsu; Science fiction; Superhero; Kaiju
- Developed by: Eiji Tsuburaya; Tetsuo Kinjo
- Starring: Susumu Kurobe; Akiji Kobayashi; Hiroko Sakurai; Sandayū Dokumamushi; Masanari Nihei; Bin Furuya
- Opening theme: Ultraman Theme by Misuzu Children's Choir
- Composer: Kunio Miyauchi
- Country of origin: Japan
- Original language: Japanese
- No. of episodes: 39

Production
- Executive producers: Toshiaki Ichikawa (1-13); Masami Sueyasu (14-39); Toshimichi Miwa (TBS)
- Running time: 24 minutes
- Production companies: Tsuburaya Productions; TBS

Original release
- Network: JNN (TBS)
- Release: July 17, 1966 – April 9, 1967

Related
- Ultra Q Ultraseven

Ultraman (Japanese: ウルトラマン, Hepburn: Urutoraman) (Note: Titled onscreen as Ultraman: A Special Effects Fantasy Series (ウルトラマン 空想特撮シリーズ, Urutoraman: Kūsō Tokusatsu Shirīzu)) is a Japanese tokusatsu science fiction television series created by Eiji Tsuburaya. Produced by Tsuburaya Productions, it is a follow-up to Ultra Q, though not technically a sequel or spin-off. Tsuburaya Productions produced 39 episodes (40, counting the pre-premiere special) that aired on Tokyo Broadcasting System (TBS) and its affiliate stations from July 17, 1966, to April 9, 1967. Its premiere topped the average rating set by Ultra Q and kept climbing each week, marking the show as a success. It was also the first Japanese television series to use a bidding system for commercial rights, allowing multiple third-party companies to sponsor the show. This was following TBS's merchandising troubles with its predecessor.

Although Ultraman is the first series to feature an Ultraman character, it is the second installment in the Ultra Series, following Ultra Q. This is symbolised by the Japanese show opening with the Ultra Q logo exploding into the Ultraman logo. Ultraman and its titular hero became a major pop culture phenomenon in Japan, generating dozens of sequels, spin-offs, imitations, parodies and tributes. Ultraman went on to generate $7.4 billion in merchandising revenue from 1966 to 1987 in Japan (equivalent to more than $21 billion adjusted for inflation) and become the world's third top-selling licensed character by the 1980s, largely due to his popularity in Asia.

A manga series of the same name serving as a sequel to the television series began publication in October 2011 and received an anime adaptation starting in April 2019. In May 2022, Toho released Shin Ultraman, a reimagining of the series directed by Shinji Higuchi.

== Premise ==
The series follows the adventures of the Science Patrol, a special scientific team investigating and combating threats from aliens and kaiju. Unbeknownst to the team, fellow member Shin Hayata possesses the ability to transform into the giant alien superhero Ultraman in moments of crisis.

== Production ==
=== Development ===
Due to the success of Ultra Q, Tokyo Broadcasting System (TBS) requested a similar themed show from Tsuburaya Productions Company (TPC), this time filmed in color and with the hopes of continuing the series with TPC. TPC founder Eiji Tsuburaya and writer Tetsuo Kinjo decided to recycle the barebones idea of Ultra Q about civilians and center the show on a team, tentatively dubbed the "Scientific Investigation Agency" (SIA), specifically designed to deal with monsters and supernatural phenomena. Tsuburaya and Kinjo repurposed unused ideas from Ultra Q, as well as the rejected outline for Woo. Tsuburaya had spent significant studio money to build his miniatures for the Godzilla films, and TPC was seeking a new project to repurpose and monetize those miniatures.

The first iteration of Ultraman was named "Bemular" and had a human host in his late 20s named "Officer Sakomizu", described as a "tough guy" in early drafts. Captain Muramatsu would have been the only SIA member to know his secret identity, and a female SIA member was added late in production. Pre-production and story layout began in December 1965 as Bemular: Scientific Investigation Agency. Writer Masahiro Yamada completed a sample teleplay titled The Birth of Bemular that featured an unused scenario originally written for Ultra Q. TBS producer Takashi Kakoi demanded that Bemular have a metallic complexion and be distinguishable from similarly designed monsters to avoid confusion. As a result, Tsuburaya and Kinjo discarded Bemular's original design in favor of a humanoid appearance. The name "Bemular" was dropped for the hero but given to Ultraman's first foe in the debut episode "Ultra Operation No. 1".

In January 1966, the production's title was changed to Redman to reflect the hero's color scheme and was unanimously approved for production a month later. In this version, Redman lands on Earth as a refugee after invaders destroyed his home planet. Redman fuses with Sakomizu and together protect the Earth from giant monsters and alien invaders. This version also featured the "Flashbeam", an early version of Ultraman's transformation device the Beta Capsule, however, the Flashbeam version resembled a futuristic fountain pen. During the casting process, TBS suggested actors with Western appearances in order to appeal to overseas markets, however, most of the cast came from Toho. On March 22, 1966, the copyright offices approved the shows's registration, now titled Ultraman. Each episode was produced on a budget of ¥20−30 million.

=== Design ===
The early Bemular version was originally conceived by Kinjo as an intergalactic reptilian creature that would enlarge itself to 164 feet (50.0 m) and come to the SIA's aid. The early design was a cross between Garuda, a mythological Hindu/Buddhist guardian bird, and Tengu, a Japanese folkloric crow-goblin. Eiji Tsuburaya found the early designs to be "too alien and sinister" and requested that production designer Tohl Narita continue drafting additional designs as teleplays were being written concurrently. Narita took inspiration from the Greek concept of cosmos (order and harmony), in contrast to Narita's monster designs for Ultra Q, which were rooted in the Greek concept of Chaos. Narita also drew inspiration from classical Greek art, ancient Egypt, the European Renaissance, and Miyamoto Musashi. Tsuburaya and Kinjo also gave their own input on Narita's designs. To reflect Ultraman's cosmic origins, his silver skin symbolized steel from an interstellar rocket and the red lining represented the surface of Mars. Narita's assistant, Akira Sasaki, sculpted clays, but became concerned about the nose and mouth looking too human. They eventually decided on a brim-like nose that runs from the mouth to the top of the head like a dorsal fin, and applied flexibility on the mouth for speech. Early outlines had Ultraman capable of spitting fire and a liquid called "silver iodine", but these ideas were dropped. A three-minute warning light called the "Color Timer" was added at the last minute due to the filmmakers feeling that Ultraman was too invincible, and also believed that it would invoke suspense and cheers from viewers.

=== Filming ===
To keep production costs from going over budget, the series was filmed on 16mm stock and optical effects on 35mm. This met the network's requirement for making new episodes on a fast-paced production schedule, due to filming starting in March 1966 for July premiere. The production crew were separated into three teams, subdivided into separate live-action filming and special effects filming groups. TBS and TPC originally agreed to air Ultraman on July 17, but TBS delayed it by one week in order to cover the spot originally intended for the final episode of Ultra Q, which was pulled from the broadcast schedule due to not featuring any monsters. TBS also wanted to beat the release of Fuji Television's similarly themed Ambassador Magma. Though production on Ultraman was proceeding well enough, it was falling behind to meet the premiere date. After meetings between TBS, Tsuburaya Productions, and sponsors, they decided to produce the Ultraman Eve Festival, a live TV special intended to introduce Ultraman to viewers that would air on July 10. This was also done to help the crew catch up and finish the premiere episode. The special was retitled The Birth of Ultraman: An Ultraman Premiere Celebration. Kunio Miyauchi, who composed the music for Ultra Q, was brought back to compose the music for Ultraman. The lyrics to the show's opening theme music were written by Hajime Tsuburaya (credited as Koichi Fuji).

=== Monsters ===
Several monster suits were produced for the show, while others were recycled from Godzilla films and Ultra Q.

Production designer Tohl Narita designed all of the show's monsters, and sometimes deviated from their original descriptions. A majority of the time, the writers did not include any specific descriptions in the teleplays and left most unnamed. The names of the monsters were decided via staff meetings, where it would also be determined if the writer had created a creature that was capable or incapable of being filmed with the special effects technology available at the time. The monsters were sculpted and fabricated by Ryosaku Takayama, Akira Sasaki, and Ekisu Productions.

Haruo Nakajima, who played Godzilla for the first 12 films in the Godzilla franchise, choreographed all the monsters' battles with Ultraman performer Bin Furuya and even played the monsters for episodes three and ten. Nakajima also had two cameos, one in episode 24 and one in episode 33 as a police officer. Ultraman featured new monster suits, as well as recycled suits from Ultra Q. Two Godzilla suits were recycled from Toho for the monster Jirahs, with the head taken from the Godzilla suit from Ebirah, Horror of the Deep and placed upon the body of the Godzilla suit from Mothra vs. Godzilla. The dorsal fins and parts of the suit were sprayed yellow and a large yellow frill was attached to disguise the connection of the head with the body. The show also marks the first appearance of Ultraman Zoffy in the finale Farewell, Ultraman.

== Cast ==
- Susumu Kurobe as Shin Hayata/Ultraman (voiced by Earl Hammond in the English dub):
  The Science Patrol member who transforms into Ultraman with the Beta Capsule. Bin Furuya portrayed Ultraman via rubber suit.
- Akiji Kobayashi as Captain Toshio Muramatsu:
  Leader of the Science Patrol. In the Japanese version, he is sometimes referred to as "Cap". His name is shortened to "Captain Mura" in the English dub.
- Sandayū Dokumamushi as Daisuke Arashi:
  The Science Patrol's expert marksman.
- Masanari Nihei as Mitsuhiro Ide:
  The Science Patrol's comical inventor. Susumu Ishikawa was originally cast in the role. Ishikawa filmed a few scenes but abruptly left the production due to contract disputes. The English dub renames the character as "Ito".
- Hiroko Sakurai as Akiko Fuji (voiced by Corinne Orr in the English dub):
  The Science Patrol's communications officer.
- Akihide Tsuzawa as Isamu Hoshino (voiced by Corinne Orr in the English dub):
  The Science Patrol's unofficial mascot. In the English dub, he is identified as Fuji's younger brother.
- Akihiko Hirata as Dr. Iwamoto:
  The Science Patrol's scientific advisor.

Cast taken from Eiji Tsuburaya: Master of Monsters.

== Episodes ==
No.	Title	Directed by	Written by	Original release date
1	"Ultra Operation No. 1"; Transliteration: "Urutora Sakusen Dai Ichigō" (Japanese: ウルトラ作戦第一号)	Hajime Tsuburaya	Tetsuo Kinjo & Shinichi Sekizawa	July 17, 1966
2	"Shoot the Invader"; Transliteration: "Shinryakusha o Ute" (Japanese: 侵略者を撃て)	Toshihiro Iijima	Kitao Senzoku	July 24, 1966
3	"Science Patrol, Move Out!"; Transliteration: "Katokutai Shutugeki seyo" (Japanese: 科特隊出撃せよ)	Toshihiro Iijima	Masahiro Yamada	July 31, 1966
4	"Five Seconds Before the Explosion"; Transliteration: "Dai Bakuhatsu Gobyō Mae" (Japanese: 大爆発五秒前)	Samaji Nonagase	Ryu Minamikawa	August 7, 1966
5	"The Secret of the Miroganda"; Transliteration: "Miroganda no Himitsu" (Japanese: ミロガンダの秘密)	Toshihiro Iijima	Keisuke Fujikawa	August 14, 1966
6	"The Coast Guard Command"; Transliteration: "Engan Keibi Meirei" (Japanese: 沿岸警備命令)	Samaji Nonagase	Masahiro Yamada	August 21, 1966
7	"The Blue Stone of Baradhi"; Transliteration: "Barāji no Aoi Ishi" (Japanese: バラージの青い石)	Samaji Nonagase	Tetsuo Kinjo & Ryu Minamikawa	August 28, 1966
8	"The Monster Anarchy Zone"; Transliteration: "Kaijū Muhō Chitai" (Japanese: 怪獣無法地帯)	Hajime Tsuburaya	Tetsuo Kinjo & Shōzō Uehara	September 4, 1966
9	"Lightning Operation"; Transliteration: "Denkōsekka Sakusen" (Japanese: 電光石火作戦)	Samaji Nonagase	Masahiro Yamada	September 11, 1966
10	"The Mysterious Dinosaur Base"; Transliteration: "Nazo no Kyōryū Kichi" (Japanese: 謎の恐竜基地)	Kazuho Mitsuta	Tetsuo Kinjo	September 18, 1966
11	"The Rascal from Outer Space"; Transliteration: "Uchū kara Kita Abarenbō" (Japanese: 宇宙から来た暴れん坊)	Kazuho Mitsuta	Tatsuo Miyata	September 25, 1966
12	"Cry of the Mummy"; Transliteration: "Miira no Sakebi" (Japanese: ミイラの叫び)	Hajime Tsuburaya	Keisuke Fujikawa	October 2, 1966
13	"Oil S.O.S."; Transliteration: "Oiru Esu Ō Esu" (Japanese: オイルSOS)	Hajime Tsuburaya	Tetsuo Kinjo	October 9, 1966
14	"The Pearl Defense Directive"; Transliteration: "Shinjugai Bōei Shirei" (Japanese: 真珠貝防衛指令)	Akio Jissoji	Mamoru Sasaki	October 16, 1966
15	"Terrifying Cosmic Rays"; Transliteration: "Kyōfu no Uchūsen" (Japanese: 恐怖の宇宙線)	Akio Jissoji	Mamoru Sasaki	October 23, 1966
16	"Science Patrol Into Space"; Transliteration: "Katokutai Uchū e" (Japanese: 科特隊宇宙へ)	Toshihiro Iijima	Kitao Senzoku	October 30, 1966
17	"Passport to Infinity"; Transliteration: "Mugen e no Pasupōto" (Japanese: 無限へのパスポート)	Toshihiro Iijima	Keisuke Fujikawa	November 6, 1966
18	"Brother from Another Planet"; Transliteration: "Yūsei kara Kita Kyōdai" (Japanese: 遊星から来た兄弟)	Samaji Nonagase	Ryu Minamikawa & Tetsuo Kinjo	November 13, 1966
19	"Demons Rise Again"; Transliteration: "Akuma wa Futatabi" (Japanese: 悪魔はふたたび)	Samaji Nonagase	Masahiro Yamada & Ryu Minamikawa	November 20, 1966
20	"Terror on Route 87"; Transliteration: "Kyōfu no Rūto Hachijūnana" (Japanese: 恐怖のルート87)	Yuzo Higuchi	Tetsuo Kinjo	November 27, 1966
21	"Breach the Wall of Smoke"; Transliteration: "Fun'en Toppa seyo" (Japanese: 噴煙突破せよ)	Yuzo Higuchi	Taro Kaido	December 4, 1966
22	"Overthrow the Surface"; Transliteration: "Chijō Hakai Kōsaku" (Japanese: 地上破壊工作)	Akio Jissoji	Mamoru Sasaki	December 11, 1966
23	"My Home Is the Earth"; Transliteration: "Kokyō wa Chikyū" (Japanese: 故郷は地球)	Akio Jissoji	Mamoru Sasaki	December 18, 1966
24	"The Undersea Science Center"; Transliteration: "Kaitei Kagaku Kichi" (Japanese: 海底科学基地)	Toshihiro Iijima	Keisuke Fujikawa	December 25, 1966
25	"The Mysterious Comet Tsuifon"; Transliteration: "Kai Susei Tsuifon" (Japanese: 怪彗星ツイフォン)	Toshihiro Iijima	Bunzo Wakatsuki	January 1, 1967
26	"The Monster Highness: Part 1"; Transliteration: "Kaijū Denka Zenpen" (Japanese: 怪獣殿下 前篇)	Hajime Tsuburaya	Tetsuo Kinjo & Bunzo Wakatsuki	January 8, 1967
27	"The Monster Highness: Part 2"; Transliteration: "Kaijū Denka Kōhen" (Japanese: 怪獣殿下 後篇)	Hajime Tsuburaya	Tetsuo Kinjo & Bunzo Wakatsuki	January 15, 1967
28	"Human Specimens 5 & 6"; Transliteration: "Ningen Hyōhon Go Roku" (Japanese: 人間標本5・6)	Samaji Nonagase	Masahiro Yamada	January 22, 1967
29	"Challenge to the Underground"; Transliteration: "Chitei e no Chōsen" (Japanese: 地底への挑戦)	Samaji Nonagase	Tetsuo Kinjo & Ryu Minamikawa	January 29, 1967
30	"Phantom of the Snow Mountains"; Transliteration: "Maboroshi no Yukiyama" (Japanese: まぼろしの雪山)	Yuzo Higuchi	Tetsuo Kinjo	February 5, 1967
31	"Who Goes There?"; Transliteration: "Kita no wa Dare da" (Japanese: 来たのは誰だ)	Yuzo Higuchi	Taro Kaido	February 12, 1967
32	"Endless Counterattack"; Transliteration: "Hateshinaki Gyakushū" (Japanese: 果てしなき逆襲)	Toshitsugu Suzuki	Keisuke Fujikawa	February 19, 1967
33	"The Forbidden Words"; Transliteration: "Kinjirareta Kotoba" (Japanese: 禁じられた言葉)	Toshitsugu Suzuki	Tetsuo Kinjo	February 26, 1967
34	"A Gift from the Sky"; Transliteration: "Sora no Okurimono" (Japanese: 空の贈り物)	Akio Jissoji	Mamoru Sasaki	March 5, 1967
35	"The Monster Graveyard"; Transliteration: "Kaijū Hakaba" (Japanese: 怪獣墓場)	Akio Jissoji	Mamoru Sasaki	March 12, 1967
36	"Don't Shoot! Arashi"; Transliteration: "Utsuna! Arashi" (Japanese: 射つな! アラシ)	Kazuho Mitsuta	Masahiro Yamada	March 19, 1967
37	"A Little Hero"; Transliteration: "Chiisana Eiyū" (Japanese: 小さな英雄)	Kazuho Mitsuta	Tetsuo Kinjo	March 26, 1967
38	"Spaceship Rescue Command"; Transliteration: "Uchūsen Kyūjo Meirei" (Japanese: 宇宙船救助命令)	Hajime Tsuburaya	Shōzō Uehara	April 2, 1967
39	"Farewell, Ultraman"; Transliteration: "Saraba Urutoraman" (Japanese: さらばウルトラマン)	Hajime Tsuburaya	Tetsuo Kinjo	April 9, 1967

- The Birth of Ultraman (ウルトラマン 誕生, Urutoraman Tanjō) a live stage show pre-premiere special intended to introduce audiences to Ultraman prior to the premiere episode. It was also produced to give the filmmakers time to complete the debut episode.
- Ultraman: Monster Movie Feature (長篇怪獣映画 ウルトラマン, Chōhen Kaijū Eiga Urutoraman) a theatrical film directed by Hajime Tsuburaya, consisting of re-edited footage from episodes 1, 8, 26, and 27. It was released by Toho Co., Ltd. on July 22, 1967, as a double feature with King Kong Escapes.
- Revive! Ultraman (甦れ!ウルトラマン, Yomigaere! Urutoraman) a short film directed by Masahiro Tsuburaya, and released in March 1996.

== English version ==
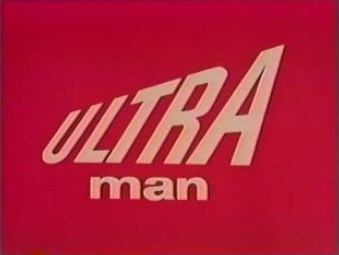
Title card for Ultraman English dub (1966)

United Artists Television picked up the rights for Ultra Q and Ultraman in the fall of 1966, two months after the first episode of Ultraman aired. Ultra Q was dubbed but never broadcast in the United States due to American TV stations preferring color shows over black-and-white shows. Ultraman ran in and out of syndication until the early 1990s. UA-TV also syndicated Ultraman internationally. Peter Fernandez, Corinne Orr, and Earl Hammond provided the voices for the dub. Fernandez also wrote and supervised the dub.

Describing the process, Fernandez said: "I had a Moviola, sometimes a projector, and I’d go back and forth over each line carefully and carefully, building the line to look like English." Fernandez also went on to explain that a grease pencil was used to mark scenes that needed to be dubbed, even if it were only a few lines. A loop of the film would be projected so that the voice actor could memorize his or her lines and see where the scene needed to be dubbed. The voice actors had to wait for a beeping signal before starting, Fernandez explained: "So in the studio you hear “Beep… beep… beep…” then you talk, as if there is a fourth beep. Those beeps are drilled into me. They are two-thirds of a second apart. Later on, the film is reassembled and mixed with the original music and sound effects." The English dub was featured in the BCI Eclipse DVD release of Ultraman, as well as subsequent DVD re-issues from Mill Creek Entertainment.

== Home media ==
=== Japan ===
In April 2013, Tsuburaya held a press conference announcing the new Ultra Series show and character, Ultraman Ginga, where they also announced that the original 1966 show will be given an HD remaster treatment in Japan. In July 2013, Bandai Visual released an HD transfer of Ultraman on Blu-ray titled Ultraman HD Remaster 2.0, to commemorate the 50th anniversary of Tsuburaya Productions. Bandai Visual released the series on three separate box sets, each containing 13 episodes. The first box set was released on July 10, 2013, the second one on October 25, 2013, and the final one on January 29, 2014.

On November 25, 2020, Tsuburaya Productions and Pony Canyon released a 3.0 HD remaster of the series on Blu-ray titled Ultraman 55th Anniversary Ultraman Archives: Ultraman MovieNEX, suitable for large screen televisions. Composite technology EXA Quality Advanced Service (EQAS) was used to process the series to remove excess picture noise while retaining an appropriate level of graininess.

=== North America ===
BCI Eclipse Home Entertainment LLC officially released Ultraman on two separate DVD volumes in 2006 and 2007, licensed from then-rights holder Southern California-based Golden Media Group Inc. (via Tokyo-based UM Corporation). BCI's first DVD release featured the first 20 episodes, while the second release featured the final 19 episodes, all presented uncut, unedited and re-mastered in color with stereo sound. These releases also featured the original Japanese audio and the English dub. When Navarre folded BCI Eclipse in December 2008, the series was shuffled over to Navarre's other home video label, Mill Creek Entertainment. In June 2009, Mill Creek re-released the complete series set on September 29, 2009, in a four-disc set with the same special features from the previous release.

On July 10, 2019, Mill Creek Entertainment announced that it had acquired most of the franchise library from Tsuburaya Productions through Indigo Entertainment, including 1,100 episodes and 20 films. Mill Creek released the series on Blu-ray and digital on October 15, 2019, in standard and steelbook editions. Mill Creek released The Birth of Ultraman Collection on Blu-ray on July 10, 2020. It included the pre-premiere special and seven episodes from the 1966 series, which included the English dub. The Blu-ray featured artwork by Alex Ross (originally created for Marvel's Ultraman comic) and was sold exclusively on DeepDiscount.

In July 2020, Shout! Factory announced that they had struck a multi-year deal with Alliance Entertainment and Mill Creek, with the blessings of Tsuburaya and Indigo, that granted them the exclusive SVOD and AVOD digital rights to the Ultra series and films (1,100 episodes and 20 film) acquired by Mill Creek the previous year. Ultraman, amongst other titles, streamed on Shout! Factory TV and Tokushoutsu in the United States and Canada.

== Post-release ==
=== Proposed sequels ===
Due to the show's success, a feature film titled Ultraman: Operation Giant was planned. Toshihiro Iijima was attached to write the script. The film was to be filmed in CinemaScope and was to introduce new characters, such as a self-sacrificing automaton built by the Science Patrol, the Baltans invading Earth with the help of a human scientist, a new subterranean monster named "Morugo", and Ultraman was to be given a new sword weapon. A sequel series tentatively titled Ultraman Continues (続ウルトラマン, Zoku Urutoraman) was also proposed; however, neither project ever materialized.

=== Adaptations ===
Harvey Comics Entertainment published two short comic book series based on Ultraman in 1993 and 1994. Bandai published the video game Ultraman for Super Famicom in 1990, and PD Ultraman Battle Collection 64 for the Nintendo 64 in 1997. The games were released in Japan only. In 2011, a manga adaptation simply titled Ultraman began serialization in Shogakukan's Monthly Hero's magazine. It serves as a sequel to the television series. It was released on August 18, 2015, in North America by Viz Media, who had received the rights on February 18, 2015. The manga was adapted into a 3DCG anime of the same name and released on Netflix in April 2019. In September 2020, Marvel Comics launched a monthly series titled The Rise of Ultraman.

In May 2022, Toho released a reimagining of the series, titled Shin Ultraman, directed by Shinji Higuchi. Using motion capture technology, Bin Furuya, the original Ultraman suit actor, portrays the titular hero alongside Hideaki Anno.

=== Legacy ===
Since its debut, both the show and character became international pop culture phenomena, inspiring rip-offs, imitators, parodies, tributes, and a multimedia franchise centered around spin-off characters based on Ultraman. The series has been recognized by Guinness World Records for "TV series with most number of spin-offs." Mark Schilling from The Japan Times called the series "a rite of passage for Japanese boys (and a few girls) and their families" since the series' debut and noted "the series is as much a part of the national fabric as furikake (rice topping) and chopsticks." SciFi Japan called the 1966 series "the gold standard of Japanese special effects television series." Ultraman has been parodied, tributed, and referenced in various media such as Ben 10, Ready Player One, The Simpsons, South Park, Kyoei Toshi, and Ant-Man. Chris Kirkpatrick, Will Smith, and Guillermo del Toro have cited the 1966 series as one of the shows they grew up watching as kids. Del Toro named Ultraman and Pigmon as his favorite characters from the show and cited Ultraman as an influence on Pacific Rim.

== See also ==
- The Ultra Series — complete list of official Ultraman-related shows
- Bio Planet Woo
