= Ultraman =

Japanese media franchise

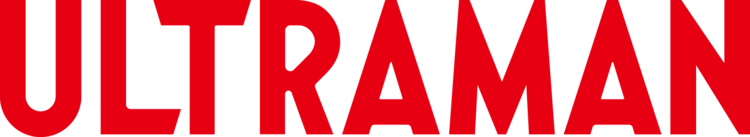
- Official logo
- Created by: Eiji Tsuburaya; Tetsuo Kinjo; Tohl Narita; Kazuho Mitsuta
- Original work: Ultra Q
- Owner: Tsuburaya Productions
- Years: 1966–present

Films and television
- Film: See below
- Television series: See below

Games
- Video game: See below

Audio
- Original music: Voyager

Official website
- m-78.jp

Ultraman, also known as the Ultra Series (ウルトラシリーズ, Urutora Shirīzu), is a Japanese science fiction media franchise owned and produced by Tsuburaya Productions, which began with the television series Ultra Q in 1966. The franchise has expanded into many television shows, films, comic books, and other media publications, becoming one of the most prominent productions in the Japanese tokusatsu and kaiju genres and pioneering the Kyodai Hero subgenre. The Ultraman series is centered on a fictional alien race of superheroes who often combat kaiju or other aliens.

In Japan, the Ultraman brand generated $7.4 billion US dollars in merchandising revenue from 1966 to 1987. This makes it one of the highest-grossing media franchises of all time. Ultraman was the world's third top-selling licensed character in the 1980s, largely due to his popularity in Asia. References to Ultraman are abundant in Japanese popular culture, much like references to Superman in Western culture.

== The Ultras ==
The franchise is centered on the "Ultras" (Japanese: ウルトラ一族, Hepburn: Urutora Ichizoku), a collective term for the fictional extraterrestrial races spread across its multiverse, with multiple origins given for them. The warriors of these continuities gather at a planet within the M78 nebula (M78星雲, Emu-Nanajūhachi seiun), (Note: During the pre-production of the original Ultraman series, the nebula was originally intended to be called the M87 nebula, a direct reference to the origin galaxy of the titular spacecraft in the 1956 film Fearful Attack of the Flying Saucers.) (not to be confused with the real Messier 78)—also called the Land of Light (光の国, Hikari no Kuni). Of the 18 billion populating it, 1 million are part of the Inter Galactic Defence Force (宇宙警備隊, Uchū Keibitai) who maintain peace in the universe from alien invaders and monsters. The Ultras that are sent to other worlds are given Color Timers, or "warning lights", which blink with increasing frequency if an Ultra's energy dwindles. They can thus remain active for only a limited span of minutes before its energy is depleted, although it can be replenished afterwards. The main protagonists of each installment end up on Earth and bond with humans or have a human incarnation, their hosts using devices to summon their Ultra's unique power.

== The Ultraman phenomenon ==
The show Ultraman was followed by many other series. Successors during the Shōwa era are: Ultraseven (1967), Return of Ultraman (1971), Ultraman Ace (1972), Ultraman Taro (1973), Ultraman Leo (1974), The Japanese Animated Television Series, The Ultraman (1979), and Ultraman 80 (1980). A second generation began during the Heisei era in 1996 with Ultraman Tiga, and the franchise continued, on and off, until its current (third) generation. This began with Ultraman Ginga in 2013.

English-language productions include the 1987 animated movie Ultraman: The Adventure Begins (known as Ultraman USA in Japan) which was produced by Hanna-Barbera; 1990 TV series Ultraman: Towards the Future (Ultraman Great in Japan) which was filmed in Australia; 1993 TV series Ultraman: The Ultimate Hero (Ultraman Powered in Japan) which was filmed in the United States; and 2024 animated film Ultraman: Rising which was produced by Netflix.

In 1993, Tsuburaya Productions and Toei Company co-produced Ultraman vs. Kamen Rider, a crossover with the original Ultraman and Toei's Kamen Rider. This direct-to-video feature is co-copyrighted by both Toei (and its subordinates, Toei Video and Ishinomori Productions) and Tsuburaya Productions.

As of 2025, Tsuburaya Productions accepts 51 Ultras as official. In 2013, the Ultra Series was cited in the Guinness Book of World Records as the record-holder for the most spin-off shows. The Ultraman brand generated $7.4 billion in merchandising revenue from 1966 to 1987, equivalent to more than $21 billion adjusted for inflation. Ultraman was the world's third top-selling licensed character in the 1980s, largely due to his popularity in Asia.

The Ultraman manga, which began in 2011, has sold more than 2.8 million copies as of 2018. At the Tokyo Comic Con on 7 December 2017, Tsuburaya Productions revealed that an anime adaptation of the manga was planned for release in 2019. It was released by Netflix.

Ultraman content, products and services have been distributed in more than 100 countries worldwide,as of March 2018. Tsuburaya has officially made their Ultraman and non-Ultraman content widely available on their YouTube channel, even simulcasting several of their series with English subtitles, the channel has reached over 2 million subscribers. In China, an Ultraman television series received 1.8 billion views on over-the-top media services between July 2017 and March 2018.

The manga author Akira Toriyama, creator of Dragon Ball and Dr. Slump, cited Ultraman as a formative influence on his work. Peyton Reed, the director of the Ant-Man films in the Marvel Cinematic Universe, said that Ant-Man's costume design was influenced by Ultraman along with Inframan, another tokusatsu superhero from China. Video game designer Hideki Kamiya (known for games such as Resident Evil 2, Devil May Cry, Viewtiful Joe, Ōkami, Bayonetta and The Wonderful 101) said he loved Godzilla and Ultraman as a child.

It was announced in November 2019 that Marvel Comics has partnered with Tsuburaya Productions to publish Ultraman comic books in 2020. As of March 2021, Bandai Namco has sold 101.87 million Ultraman soft figures (heroes and monsters) since 1983, while Bandai Namco Arts (including Bandai Visual) has sold 8.48 million Ultraman home video units between January 1988 and March 2021.

== Controversies ==
=== Licensing rights dispute ===
Ultraman's licensing rights outside Japan have been the subject of a prolonged legal dispute between Tsuburaya Productions and Chaiyo Productions based in Thailand. Tsuburaya had previously collaborated with Chaiyo on the production of two movies, The 6 Ultra Brothers vs. the Monster Army and Jumborg Ace & Giant—the latter of which featured another Tsuburaya superhero, Jumborg Ace—in 1974. Sompote Saengduenchai, founder/president of Chaiyo Productions, claimed and maintained that, in 1976, Noboru Tsuburaya, the son of the late Eiji Tsuburaya, had given him and his company a contract which had given him rights to everything Ultraman outside Japanese territories.

In spite of the fact that the document failed to state clearly and specifically exactly what had been given to Tsuburaya in exchange for these rights, Japanese and Thai courts accepted this contract as real and binding because of the supposed hanko of the late Noboru Tsuburaya, who had died in 1995, in the document. Tsuburaya Productions insisted and maintained that the contract was a forgery and repeatedly contested the issue.

After an eight-year battle in the courts of both countries, Sompote Saengduenchai was awarded a favorable decision in 2004. Though the Supreme Court of Japan ruled that he owned the international rights to the first six instalments, he would later create three new Ultras: Ultraman Millennium, Dark Ultraman and Ultraman Elite. On 23 August 2006, Tsuburaya Productions filed a new lawsuit against Chaiyo for copyright infringement and plagiarism (concerning the characters), and the court case was taken to China. The Chinese courts in Beijing opened "The Ultraman Copyright Study Group" in response to the lawsuit. In April 2007, the Thailand Intellectual Property Court ruled in favor of Tsuburaya Productions, ordering Chaiyo to cease and desist making commercial profits from them. The defendants were also fined THB 15,000,000 (approx. JPY 50,904,959 or US$428,673.50 c. April 2007) plus interest and attorneys' fees.

On 5 February 2008, Thailand's Supreme Court ruled in favor of Tsuburaya Productions of Japan after they made an appeal to the initial ruling. The ruling ended the long legal battle by finding Sompote Saengduenchai was not a co-creator of Ultraman. The decision ended Sompote's bid to continue his enterprise, and the court gave Sompote 30 days to stop profiteering from Ultraman. The final ruling saw Tsuburaya Productions as the sole copyright owner. Sompote was also required to pay THB 10,700,000 plus interest at the rate of 7.5 percent a year starting from 16 December 1997, when the original lawsuit was filed.

In 2009, the Thai Intellectual Property Court and the Tokyo District Court both ruled in favour of the Thai company. This led to the Tokyo District Court on 30 September 2010, ordering Tsuburaya Productions Co. of Japan to pay damages of 16.36 million yen (Bt5.9 million) to Sompote Saengduenchai of Thailand for violating his overseas copyrights on the Ultraman characters.

After the announcement of the film Dragon Force: So Long, Ultraman in July 2017, the dispute on the ownership of the franchise has escalated. But on 20 November 2017, through a Los Angeles court ruling by Judge Andre Birotte Jr., Tsuburaya won the lawsuit against Chaiyo and affiliate groups on the rights of the series after the jury concluded that the supposed agreement between Noboru Tsuburaya and Chaiyo was "not authentic". Despite UM Corporation and Chaiyo filing a counter-dispute, in April 2018, the legal court came to a definite close where a final judgement states that the dispute and the document was deemed invalid, forbidding UMC to use the Ultra Series and all its related characters and forced them to pay Tsubaraya damages for its infringement of its rights.

With the release of the sequel film Dragon Force: Rise of Ultraman (Chinese: 钢铁飞龙之奥特曼崛起; pinyin: Gāngtiě fēilóng zhī àotèmàn juéqǐ), issues between UMC, Bluearc and Tsubaraya had reignited and the company took legal actions against the two companies again. On 10 December 2019, it was confirmed by Tsuburaya that the court has rejected UMC and Bluearc's appeal for a retrial, stating the court's first verdict of regarding the rights and ownership of Ultraman to Tsuburaya is still legitimate and final, and that any future appeals by UMC and Bluearc will likely be rejected. As UMC and Bluearc failed to file a further appeal by 4 March 2020, they were to pay US$4,000,000 (approx. 400,000,000 Japanese yen) in compensatory damages, as well as other various court fees. The resulting victory has reached Thailand as well and the Thai Supreme Court ordered a ruling in favor Tsuburaya Productions as the legitimate copyright owner of the shows listed in the License Granting Agreement alongside ownership over Hanuman vs. 7 Ultraman (and its remake, Hanuman vs. 11 Ultraman) and Jumborg Ace & Giant. Sompote had made an appeal to the court over the decision, but was dismissed. Sompote believes the decision would affect the former two movies' status as national heritage items, and has appealed to both the Supreme Court and Ministry of Culture on that front.

Sompote Saengduenchai died on 26 August 2021. In May 2026, the Tokyo District Court fully upheld Tsuburaya's judgement.

=== Malaysian book ban ===
On 6 March 2014, the Malaysian Ministry of Home Affairs announced that it had banned the publication of an Ultraman comic book Ultraman: The Ultra Power" due to contents that were detrimental to public order". Social media users later noticed that a page in the book described the character of Ultraman King (from the film Mega Monster Battle: Ultra Galaxy) as a god, which in the Malaysian language is the Arabic word Allah. The Home Ministry later confirmed that the use of Allah was indeed the reason for the ban, claiming that the comparison may "confuse Muslim children and damage their faith". This highlighted the larger ban to prevent non-Muslims in Malaysia from using the word Allah, as well as a suit from the Catholic Church of Malaysia over its usage.

== Television series ==
=== Main series ===
#	Year	Title	No. of episodes	Generation	
#	Year	Title	No. of episodes	Period	Line-Up
1	1966	Ultraman	39	Shōwa	Classical
2	1967	Ultraseven	49	Shōwa	Classical
3	1971	Return of Ultraman (Note: Also known as Ultraman Jack)	51	Shōwa	Classical
4	1972	Ultraman Ace	52	Shōwa	Classical
5	1973	Ultraman Taro	53	Shōwa	Classical
6	1974	Ultraman Leo	51	Shōwa	Classical
7	1980	Ultraman 80	50	Shōwa	Classical
8	1996	Ultraman Tiga	52	Heisei	Revival
9	1997	Ultraman Dyna	51	Heisei	Revival
10	1998	Ultraman Gaia	51	Heisei	Revival
11	2000	Ultraman Neos	12	Heisei	Revival
12	2001	Ultraman Cosmos	65	Heisei	Revival
13	2004	Ultraman Nexus	37	Heisei	Revival
14	2005	Ultraman Max	39	Heisei	Revival
15	2006	Ultraman Mebius	50	Heisei	Revival
16	2007	Ultraseven X	12	Heisei	Revival
17	2013	Ultraman Ginga	11	Heisei	New Generation
18	2014	Ultraman Ginga S	16	Heisei	New Generation
19	2015	Ultraman X	22	Heisei	New Generation
20	2016	Ultraman Orb	25	Heisei	New Generation
21	2016	Ultraman Orb: The Origin Saga	12	Heisei	New Generation
22	2017	Ultraman Geed	25	Heisei	New Generation
23	2018	Ultraman R/B	25	Heisei	New Generation
24	2019	Ultraman Taiga	26	Reiwa	New Generation
25	2020	Ultraman Z	25	Reiwa	New Generation
26	2021	Ultraman Trigger	25	Reiwa	New Generation
27	2022	Ultraman Decker	25	Reiwa	New Generation
28	2023	Ultraman Blazar	25	Reiwa	New Generation
29	2024	Ultraman Arc	25	Reiwa	New Generation
30	2025	Ultraman Omega	25	Reiwa	New Generation
31	2026	Ultraman Teo	TBD	Reiwa	New Generation

English-language series

Year	Title		No. of episodes	Filming location
Year	Japanese	International	No. of episodes	Filming location
1990	Ultraman Great	Ultraman: Towards the Future	13	South Australia, Australia
1993	Ultraman Powered	Ultraman: The Ultimate Hero	13	California, United States

=== Other series ===
Year	Title	No. of episodes	Notes
1966	Ultra Q	28	First entry in the Ultra Q subseries and the first series ever of the Ultra Series.
1979	The Ultraman (Note: Also known as Ultraman Joneus)	50	First Ultraman anime series. Animation services was provided by Nippon Sunrise.
1991	Ultraman Kids: 30 Million Light-Years in Search of Mother	26	Second Ultraman anime series. Animation services was provided by Trans Arts and Studio Sign.
2004	Ultra Q: Dark Fantasy	26	Second entry in the Ultra Q subseries.
2007	Ultra Galaxy Mega Monster Battle	13	First entry in the Ultra Galaxy subseries.
2008	Never Ending Odyssey	13	Second entry in the Ultra Galaxy subseries.
2013	Neo Ultra Q	12	Third entry in the Ultra Q subseries.
2019	Ultraman	31	Third Ultraman anime series. Based on 2011 Ultraman manga by Eiichi Shimizu (story) and Tomohiro Shimoguchi (art). Animation services was provided by Production I.G and Sola Digital Arts.

=== Miniseries ===
- Andro Melos (1983)
- Ultraman Kids Proverb Stories (1986, anime)
- Ultraman Graffiti (1990, anime)
- Ultraman Nice (1999)
- Ultraman Gaia Again (2001)
- Ultra Zero Fight (2012)
- Ultra Fight Victory (2015)
- Ultra Fight Orb (2017)
- Ultra Galaxy Fight: New Generation Heroes (2019)
- Ultra Galaxy Fight: The Absolute Conspiracy (2020)
- Sevenger Fight (2021)
- Ultra Galaxy Fight: The Destined Crossroad (2022)

== Films ==
Year	Title	Runtime	Film format
1967	Ultraman: Monster Movie Feature	79 minutes	Compilation
1974	The 6 Ultra Brothers vs. the Monster Army (Thailand)	103 minutes	Feature
1979	Ultraman	102 minutes	Compilation
1979	Ultraman: Great Monster Decisive Battle	100 minutes	Compilation
1981	The Adventures of Ultraman	103 minutes	Animation
1984	Ultraman Zoffy: Ultra Warriors vs. the Giant Monster Army	85 minutes	Compilation
1984	Ultraman Story	93 minutes	Feature
1987	Ultraman: The Adventure Begins (United States)	75 minutes	Animation
1988	Space Warriors 2000 (United Kingdom)	92 minutes	Feature
1990	Ultra Q: Legend of the Stars	103 minutes	Feature
1996	Ultraman Wonderful World: Revive Ultraman — 23 minutes; Ultraman Company (Note: Animated segment) — 29 minutes; Ultraman Zearth — 51 minutes	103 minutes	Anthology
1997	Ultraman Zearth: Ultra Nyan: The Mysterious Cat Who Fell from the Starry Sky — 30 minutes; Ultraman Zearth 2: Supermen Big Battle – Light and Shadow — 66 minutes	96 minutes	Anthology
1998	Ultramen Tiga & Dyna: Ultra Nyan: The Great Happy Operation — 30 minutes; Ultramen Tiga & Dyna: Warriors of the Star of Light — 68 minutes	98 minutes	Anthology
1999	Ultraman Gaia: The Battle in Hyperspace	74 minutes	Feature
2000	Ultraman Tiga: The Final Odyssey	85 minutes	Feature
2001	Ultraman Cosmos: The First Contact	89 minutes	Feature
2002	Ultraman Cosmos 2: The Blue Planet	76 minutes	Feature
2003	Ultraman Cosmos vs. Justice: The Final Battle	77 minutes	Feature
2004	Ultraman: The Next	97 minutes	Feature
2006	Ultraman Mebius & Ultra Brothers	93 minutes	Feature
2008	Superior 8 Ultra Brothers	97 minutes	Feature
2009	Mega Monster Battle: Ultra Galaxy Legends	96 minutes	Feature
2010	Ultraman Zero: The Revenge of Belial	100 minutes	Feature
2012	Ultraman Saga	90 minutes	Feature
2015	Ultraman Ginga S: The Movie	65 minutes	Feature
2016	Ultraman X: The Movie	73 minutes	Feature
2017	Dragon Force: So Long, Ultraman (China)	88 minutes	Animation
2017	Ultraman Orb: The Movie	72 minutes	Feature
2018	Ultraman Geed: The Movie	72 minutes	Feature
2019	Dragon Force: Rise of Ultraman (China)	90 minutes	Animation
2019	Ultraman R/B: The Movie	72 minutes	Feature
2020	Ultraman Taiga: The Movie	72 minutes	Feature
2022	Ultraman Trigger: Episode Z	74 minutes	Feature
2022	Shin Ultraman	112 minutes	Feature
2023	Ultraman Decker Finale: Journey to Beyond	75 minutes	Feature
2024	Ultraman Blazar the Movie: Tokyo Kaiju Showdown	76 minutes	Feature
2024	Ultraman: Rising (United States)	117 minutes	Animation
2025	Ultraman Arc the Movie: The Clash of Light and Evil	75 minutes	Feature
‡ The flags indicate that the films are foreign (co-)productions. indicates unauthorized/unlicensed productions.

Short films

- 1969: Ultraman & Ultraseven: Great Violent Monster Fight — 15 minutes
- 1971: Return of Ultraman (compilation) — 45 minutes
- 1971: Return of Ultraman: Fear of the Tornado Monsters (compilation) — 45 minutes
- 1984: Ultraman Kids: The Pleasant Friends of Planet M7.8 (anime) — 24 minutes
- 1996: Ultraman Zearth: Parody Chapter — 18 minutes
- 1996: Ultraman: Super Fighter Legend (anime) — 39 minutes
- 2005: Ultraman Nexus: Lost Memories — 45 minutes
- 2013: Ultraman Ginga Theater Special — 45 minutes
- 2014: Ultraman Ginga: Ultra Monster Hero Battle Royal — 45 minutes

== Original Video Tokusatsu (OVT) ==
Title	No. of episodes	Release date
Heisei Ultraseven	16	1994–2002
Special Duology — 2 episodes; 30th Anniversary Specials — 3 episodes; The Final Chapters — 6 episodes; Evolution — 5 episodes
Heisei Ultramen Side Stories	3	2001–2002
Ultraman Tiga: The Giant Resurrected in the Ancient Past; Ultraman Dyna: Return of Hanejiro; Ultraman Gaia: Gaia Again
Ultraman Mebius Side Stories	7	2006–2009
Hikari Saga — 3 episodes; Armored Darkness — 2 episodes; Ghost Reverse — 2 episodes
Ultraman Zero Side Stories	4	2010–2011
Ultraman Zero vs. Darklops Zero (2010) — 2 episodes; Killer the Beatstar (2011) — 2 episodes

== Biography series and variety shows ==
- Ultra Fight (1970)
- Ultra Super Fight (1994)
- Ultraman Boy's Ultra Coliseum (2003)
- Ultra Zone (2011)
- Ultraman Retsuden (2011–2013)
- New Ultraman Retsuden (2013–2016)
- Ultraman Zero: The Chronicle (2017)
- Ultraman: The Prime (2017)
- Ultraman Orb: The Chronicle (2018)
- Ultraman New Generation Chronicle (2019)
- Ultraman Chronicle Zero & Geed (2020)
- Ultraman Chronicle Z: Heroes' Odyssey (2021)
- Ultraman Chronicle D (2022)
- Ultraman New Generation Stars (2023)

== Video games ==
- Ultraman (1984) MSX
- Ultraman: Kaijuu Teikoku no Gyakushuu (1987) Famicom Disk System
- Ultraman 2 (1987) Famicom Disk System
- Ultraman Club: Chikyuu Dakkan Sakusen (1988) Famicom Disk System
- Ultraman Club 2: Kaette Kita Ultraman Club (1990) Famicom
- Ultraman Club: Teki Kaijuu o Hakken Seyo (1990) Game Boy
- SD Battle Ozumo: Heisei Hero Basho (1990) Famicom
- SD Hero Soukessen: Taose! Aku no Gundan (1990) Famicom
- SD the Great Battle (1990) Super Famicom
- Battle Dodge Ball (1991) Super Famicom
- Ultraman Club 3: Mata Mata Shutsugeki!! Ultra Kyōdai (1991) Famicom
- Ultraman (1991) Game Boy
- Ultraman (1991) Super Famicom
- Ultraman (1991) Arcade
- Ultraman: Towards the Future (1991) SNES
- Ultraman Club: Kaijuu Dai Kessen!! (1992) Famicom
- The Great Battle II: Last Fighter Twin (1992) Super Famicom
- Versus Hero: Road to the King Fight (1992) Game Boy
- Battle Dodge Ball Game Boy (1992)
- Hero Senki: Project Olympus (1992) Super Famicom
- Battle Soccer: Field no Hasha (1992) Super Famicom
- Great Battle Cyber (1992) Famicom
- Ultraman Club: Tatakae! Ultraman Kyoudai!! (1992) Arcade
- Battle Baseball (1993) Famicom
- The Great Battle III (1993) Super Famicom
- Battle Dodge Ball II (1993) Super Famicom
- Tekkyu Fight! The Great Battle Gaiden (1993) Game Boy
- Ultra Toukon Densetsu (1993) Arcade
- Cult Master: Ultraman ni Miserarete (1993) Game Boy
- Ultraman (1993) Sega Mega Drive
- Ultraman Club: Supokon Fight! Famicom (1993)
- Ultraseven Super Famicom (1993)
- Ultraman Powered 3DO (1994)
- Ultraman Chou Toushi Gekiden Game Boy (1994)
- The Great Battle Gaiden 2: Matsuri da Wasshoi Super Famicom (1994)
- Gaia Saver Super Famicom (1994)
- Battle Soccer 2 Super Famicom (1994)
- The Great Battle IV Super Famicom (1994)
- Ultraman Powered: Kaijuu Gekimetsu Sakusen Playdia (1994)
- Ultraseven: Chikyu Boei Sakusen Playdia (1994)
- Ultraman Ball Game Boy (1994)
- Ultra League Super Famicom (1995)
- The Great Battle V Super Famicom (1995)
- Battle Crusher Game Boy (1995)
- Battle Pinball Super Famicom (1995)
- Battle Racers Super Famicom (1995)
- Super Pachinko Taisen Super Famicom (1995)
- Super Pachinko Taisen Game Boy (1995)
- Super Tekkyu Fight! Super Famicom (1995)
- Ultra X Weapons/Ultra Keibitai Arcade (1995)
- Ultraman Hiragana Daisakusen Playdia (1995)
- Ultraman Alphabet TV e Yokoso Playdia (1995)
- PD Ultraman Invader PS1 (1995)
- PD Ultraman Link Sega Saturn (1996)
- Ultraman: Ultra Land Suuji de Asobou Playdia (1996)
- Ultraman: Chinou Up Daisakusen Playdia (1996)
- SD Ultra Battle: Ultraman Densetsu Super Famicom (1996)
- Ultraman Zukan Sega Saturn (1996)
- Ultraman Zearth PS1 (1996)
- Ultraman: Hikari no Kyojin Densetsu Sega Saturn (1996)
- Ultraman Zukan 2 Sega Saturn (1997)
- The Great Battle VI PS1 (1997)
- Battle Formation PS1 (1997)
- Ultraman Fighting Evolution (1998)
- Ultraman Zukan 3 Sega Saturn (1998)
- Ultraman Tiga & Ultraman Dyna: New Generations PS1 (1998)
- PD Ultraman Battle Collection 64 Nintendo 64 (1999)
- Super Hero Operations PS1 (1999)
- Great Battle Pocket Game Boy Color (1999)
- Super Hero Operations: Diedal's Ambition PS1 (2000)
- Kids Station: Bokurato Asobou! Ultraman TV PS1 (2000)
- Kids Station: Ultraman Cosmos PS1 (2001)
- Super Tokusatsu Taisen 2001 PS1 (2001)
- Ultraman Fighting Evolution 2 PS2 (2002)
- Charinko Hero Nintendo GameCube (2003)
- Ultraman PS2 (2004)
- Ultraman Fighting Evolution 3 PS2 (2004)
- Ultraman Fighting Evolution Rebirth PS2 (2005)
- Ultraman Nexus PS2 (2005)
- Ultraman Fighting Evolution 0 PSP (2006)
- Jissen Pachi-Slot Hisshouhou! Ultraman Club ST PS2 (2006)
- Pachitte Chonmage Tatsujin 12: Pachinko Ultraman PS2 (2007)
- Daikaiju Battle: Ultra Coliseum Nintendo Wii (2008)
- Kaiju Busters Nintendo DS (2009)
- Ultra Coliseum DX: Ultra Senshi Daishuketsu Nintendo Wii (2010)
- Kaiju Busters POWERED Nintendo DS (2011)
- The Great Battle Full Blast PSP (2012)
- Battle Dodge Ball III PSP (2012)
- Lost Heroes Nintendo 3DS, PSP (2012)
- Heroes' VS PSP (2013)
- Ultraman All-Star Chronicle PSP (2013)
- Super Hero Generation PS3, PS Vita (2014)
- Lost Heroes 2 Nintendo 3DS (2015)
- Ultraman Fusion Fight! Arcade (2016)
- City Shrouded in Shadow PS4, PS Vita (2017)
- Ultraman R/B Nintendo Switch (2018)
- Super Robot Wars 30 Nintendo Switch, PlayStation 4, Steam (2021)
- Godzilla Battle Line Android, iOS, Microsoft Windows (2022)
- Ultra Kaiju Monster Rancher (2022) Nintendo Switch
- GigaBash Microsoft Windows, PS4, PS5, Nintendo Switch, Xbox One, Xbox Series X/S (2023)

== Books ==
=== Comics ===
==== Harvey Comics series ====
Between 1993 and 1994, Harvey Comics published two comic book series based on the 1966 Ultraman television series.

==== Dark Horse Comics series ====
In 2003, Dark Horse Comics published a comic book based on Ultraman Tiga.

==== Marvel Comics series ====
Marvel Comics started publishing an initial Ultraman comic book limited series titled The Rise of Ultraman, written by Kyle Higgins & Matt Groom with art by Francesco Manna. It debuted in September 2020 and concluded in January 2021.

A second series titled The Trials of Ultraman premiered in March 2021, with Higgins, Groom and Manna returning and concluded in August of the same year.

A third series titled The Mystery of Ultraseven, once again written by Higgins and Groom, and drawn by Davide Tinto, David Lopez, and Gurihiru, was released on August 17, 2022.

During Anime Expo 2022, Groom teased a crossover event between the current Ultraman comics with the Marvel Universe for 2023. In May 2024, Marvel and Tsubaraya officially announced the Ultraman x Avengers limited series to debut for release on August 14, 2024.

== Bibliography ==
- Tsuburaya Productions, ed. (1982). 不滅のヒーローウルトラマン白書. ファンタスティック・コレクション・スペシャル (First ed.). Asahi Sonorama. Magazine Code：6789780.
- Ragone, August (2007). Eiji Tsuburaya: Master of Monsters. Chronicle Books. ISBN 9780811860789.
