= Ultra Q =

Japanese television series

- Logo
- Genre: Tokusatsu; Science fiction Fantasy; Kaiju
- Written by: Toshihiro Iijima (head)
- Directed by: Hajime Tsuburaya
- Starring: Kenji Sahara; Yasuhiko Saijou; Hiroko Sakurai
- Country of origin: Japan
- Original language: Japanese
- No. of episodes: 28

Production
- Executive producers: Eiji Tsuburaya; Takashi Kakoi (TBS); Hitoshi Shibusawa (TBS)
- Running time: 24 minutes
- Production companies: Tsuburaya Productions; TBS

Original release
- Network: JNN (TBS)
- Release: January 2 – July 3, 1966

Related
- Ultraman

Ultra Q (ウルトラQ, Urutora Kyū) is a 1966 Japanese tokusatsu kaiju television series created by Eiji Tsuburaya, first broadcast on TBS on January 2, 1966 and having its twenty-eighth and final episode aired on December 14, 1967. This series was the first entry in Tsuburaya Productions long-running Ultraman franchise, whose eponymous character would be introduced in the following and more popular series, Ultraman (1966).

Ultra Q can be described as a half-hour Toho kaiju series. Executive producer Eiji Tsuburaya intended this series to be more like the American television series The Twilight Zone and The Outer Limits, featuring a variety of strange and unusual stories. After a survey, the TBS network convinced Tsuburaya Productions to add more giant monsters, as children were intensely interested in them, since Godzilla and Gamera were sensational characters during the period. Some commentators have described a "Kaiju Boom" which began after Ultra Q's success. Much like The X-Files, the series features continuing characters who investigate strange supernatural phenomena, including giant monsters, aliens, ghosts, and various other threats.

The originally planned title of this project was Unbalance, and was subsequently renamed Ultra Q mostly due to the word "Ultra" gaining popularity due to the Japanese gymnast Gold Medal recipient in the 1964 Summer Olympics using a technique named "Ultra C". The "Q" stands for "Question" and is also tied with another hit TBS series, Obake no Q-tarō, an animated series based on the manga by Fujiko Fujio. The series began production in 1964, with the premiere set for January 1966. At the time, this was the most expensive television series ever produced in Japan.

== Characters ==
- Jun Manjome (万城目 淳, Manjōme Jun; played by Kenji Sahara): Aviator at Hoshikawa Air Service and amateur SF writer.
- Yuriko Edogawa (江戸川 由利子, Edogawa Yuriko; played by Hiroko Sakurai): Reporter for the Daily News.
- Ippei Togawa (戸川 一平, Togawa Ippei; played by Yasuhiko Saijou): Jun's aviation partner at Hoshikawa.
- Professor Ichinotani (一ノ谷博士, Ichinotani-hakase; played by Ureo Egawa): world-renowned scientist, and occasional assistance to Jun, Yuriko and Ippei in times of crisis.
- News Desk Editor, Seki (関デスク, Seki Desuku; played by Yoshifumi Tajima): Yuriko's boss and editor at the Daily News.

== Monsters ==
The monster Gomess from episode 1. The monster was brought to life with a modified Godzilla suit used in the films Mothra vs. Godzilla and Ghidorah, the Three-Headed Monster.

Because of his stature as a filmmaker, and with his close relationship with Toho (they were investors in, and on the Board of Directors at, Tsuburaya Productions), Eiji Tsuburaya was ordered by his crew to take what they needed from the prop warehouse, where the various props from his films were stored, for use on the series. The large Manda prop was used for the dragon Kairyu (while the head was used as the front portion of a Viking ship seen in episode 12), as well as the giant octopus prop from Frankenstein vs. Baragon became Sudar, while the Maguma suit from Gorath was repurposed as Todola. Other suits and props were refurbished to play some of the monsters, such as Godzilla for Gomess, King Kong for Goro, Baragon for Pagos, and a small, mechanical Rodan prop was stripped down and rebuilt as the bird monsters Litra and Largeus, respectively.

== Episodes ==
No.	Title	Original release date
1	"Defeat Gomess!"; Transliteration: "Gomesu o Taose!" (Japanese: ゴメスを倒せ!)	January 2, 1966
2	"Goro and Goro"; Transliteration: "Gorō to Gorō" (Japanese: 五郎とゴロー)	January 9, 1966
3	"The Gift from Space"; Transliteration: "Uchū kara no Okurimono" (Japanese: 宇宙からの贈りもの)	January 16, 1966
4	"Mammoth Flower"; Transliteration: "Manmosu Furawā" (Japanese: マンモスフラワー)	January 23, 1966
5	"Peguila Is Here!"; Transliteration: "Pegira ga Kita!" (Japanese: ペギラが来た!)	January 30, 1966
6	"Grow Up! Little Turtle"; Transliteration: "Sodateyo! Kame" (Japanese: 育てよ! カメ)	February 6, 1966
7	"S.O.S. Mount Fuji"; Transliteration: "Esu Ō Esu Fujisan" (Japanese: SOS富士山)	February 13, 1966
8	"Terror of the Sweet Honey"; Transliteration: "Amai Mitsu no Kyōfu" (Japanese: 甘い蜜の恐怖)	February 20, 1966
9	"Baron Spider"; Transliteration: "Kumo Danshaku" (Japanese: クモ男爵)	February 27, 1966
10	"The Underground Super Express Goes West"; Transliteration: "Chitei Chōtokkyū Nishi e" (Japanese: 地底超特急西へ)	March 6, 1966
11	"Balloonga"; Transliteration: "Barunga" (Japanese: バルンガ)	March 13, 1966
12	"I Saw a Bird"; Transliteration: "Tori o Mita" (Japanese: 鳥を見た)	March 20, 1966
13	"Garadama" (Japanese: ガラダマ)	March 27, 1966
14	"Tokyo Ice Age"; Transliteration: "Tōkyō Hyōgaki" (Japanese: 東京氷河期)	April 3, 1966
15	"Kanegon's Cocoon"; Transliteration: "Kanegon no Mayu" (Japanese: カネゴンの繭)	April 10, 1966
16	"Garamon Strikes Back"; Transliteration: "Garamon no Gyakushū" (Japanese: ガラモンの逆襲)	April 17, 1966
17	"The 1/8 Project"; Transliteration: "Hachibun-no-Ichi Keikaku" (Japanese: 1/8計画)	April 24, 1966
18	"The Rainbow's Egg"; Transliteration: "Niji no Tamago" (Japanese: 虹の卵)	May 1, 1966
19	"Challenge from the Year 2020"; Transliteration: "Nisen-nijū-nen no Chōsen" (Japanese: 2020年の挑戦)	May 8, 1966
20	"The Primordial Amphibian Ragon"; Transliteration: "Kaitei Genjin Ragon" (Japanese: 海底原人ラゴン)	May 15, 1966
21	"Space Directive M774"; Transliteration: "Uchū Shirei Emu Nana Nana Yon" (Japanese: 宇宙指令M774)	May 22, 1966
22	"Metamorphosis"; Transliteration: "Henshin" (Japanese: 変身)	May 29, 1966
23	"Fury of the South Sea"; Transliteration: "Nankai no Ikari" (Japanese: 南海の怒り)	June 5, 1966
24	"The Statue of Goga"; Transliteration: "Gōga no Zō" (Japanese: ゴーガの像)	June 12, 1966
25	"The Devil Child"; Transliteration: "Akumakko" (Japanese: 悪魔ッ子)	June 19, 1966
26	"Blazing Glory"; Transliteration: "Moero Eikō" (Japanese: 燃えろ栄光)	June 26, 1966
27	"The Disappearance of Flight 206"; Transliteration: "Ni Maru Roku Bin Shōmetsu-su" (Japanese: 206便消滅す)	July 3, 1966
28	"Open Up!"; Transliteration: "Aketekure!" (Japanese: あけてくれ!)	December 17, 1967

== English dub ==
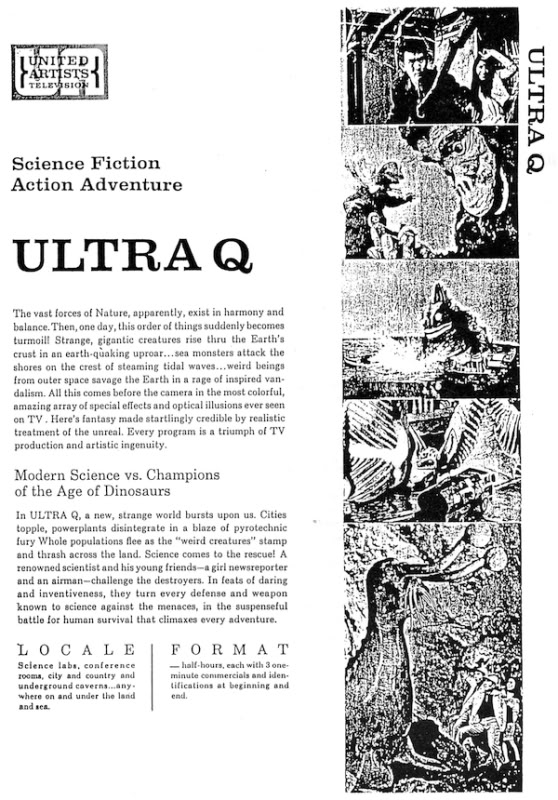
Page from United Artists Television's Press Kit

In 1967, Ultra Q was licensed from Tsuburaya and TBS by CBS Films, producers of The Twilight Zone. For the task of dubbing, CBS hired Film House in Toronto, Canada, what is now DeLuxe Toronto. Tsuburaya provided translated scripts, plus English language opening and closing credits, and a custom, swirling title-card. The series itself was dubbed in its 28-episode entirety. At some point, CBS Films backed out of licensing the series, and it was picked up, along with Ultraman, by United Artists Television, producers of The Outer Limits. Subsequently, United Artists Television hired Titra Studios to dub Ultraman. Ultraman was syndicated, however, Ultra Q was not, due to being in black-and-white at a time when most television was switching to color. After Ultraman finished its run in syndication, audio and film masters, and other materials, for both series went into storage, eventually finding their way into the MGM vaults, after MGM acquired United Artists in 1980.

Initially it was commonly believed, even by Tsuburaya Productions, that only one episode, Episode 3 ("Gift From Outer Space"), was dubbed into English as a pilot. Over the last decade, other episodes have been discovered in the hands of U.S. private collectors on the 16mm film format.

== Radio drama ==
In 2003, a weekly radio drama series was produced called The Ultra Q Club. It featured voice acting from the original Ultra Q cast.

== Legacy ==
In the years following the show's original run, a live action film called Ultra Q The Movie: Legend of the Stars was released in 1990. In 2004, a new series called Ultra Q: Dark Fantasy was produced, while another series called Neo Ultra Q began airing in early 2013.

== Production ==
The original concept of the show (when it was going to be called Unbalance) was ultimately used for a 13-episode horror anthology series entitled Horror Theater Unbalance that was produced by Tsuburaya Productions in 1973.

Various Ultra Q monsters were reused or redressed for various monsters in Ultraman. Kemur and Ragon (both of them now giant-sized) returned, while the Garamon suit was reused and repaired to serve as Pigmon. Other suits were altered to play other monsters, such as Pegulia being altered into Chandlar, Kemur being altered into Alien Zetton, Pagos being altered into Neronga (and later Magular and Gabora), while the head of the Cicada Human was modified to become the head of Alien Baltan. Finally, Peter's suit was modified to become that of Guesra.

== Home media ==
=== Japan ===
In 2013, Tsuburaya Productions and Bandai Visual released the series on Blu-ray, in monochrome and colorized editions. In 2018, Tsuburaya released four episodes in individual Blu-ray and DVD sets with newly produced special features, as part of their Ultraman Archives project. In November 2019, Tsuburaya released a 4K restoration of the series on Ultra HD Blu-ray.

=== North America ===
In August 2013, Shout! Factory released the series on DVD. In July 2019, Mill Creek Entertainment announced that it had acquired most of the Ultra series library from Tsuburaya Productions through Indigo Entertainment, including 1,100 TV episodes and 20 films. Mill Creek released the series on Blu-ray and digital on October 15, 2019, in standard and steelbook sets.

In July 2020, Shout! Factory announced to have struck a multi-year deal with Alliance Entertainment and Mill Creek, with the blessings of Tsuburaya and Indigo, that granted them the exclusive SVOD and AVOD digital rights to the Ultra series and films (1,100 TV episodes and 20 films) acquired by Mill Creek the previous year. Ultra Q, amongst other titles, will stream in the United States and Canada through Shout! Factory TV and Tokushoutsu.

== Bibliography ==
- The Q-Files, Complete Ultra Q Episode Guide by Jim Cirronella & Kevin Grays, Originally published in Kaiju-Fan #4 (November 1996) .
- Great Encyclopedia of Ultra Monsters (orig.: ウルトラ怪獣大全集), Domdom (1995), ISBN 978-4-09-101411-5
- So Crazy Japanese Toys!, by Jimbo Matison, Chronicle Books (2003), ISBN 978-0-8118-3529-9
- The Ultra Bizarre World of Ultra Q (Parts 1–3) by Mike Bianco. Originally published in G-Fan #62-64, May 2003-December 2003.
