= Tsuburaya Productions =

Japanese film, television, and special effects company

Tsuburaya Productions Co., Ltd.
- Logo used since 2024

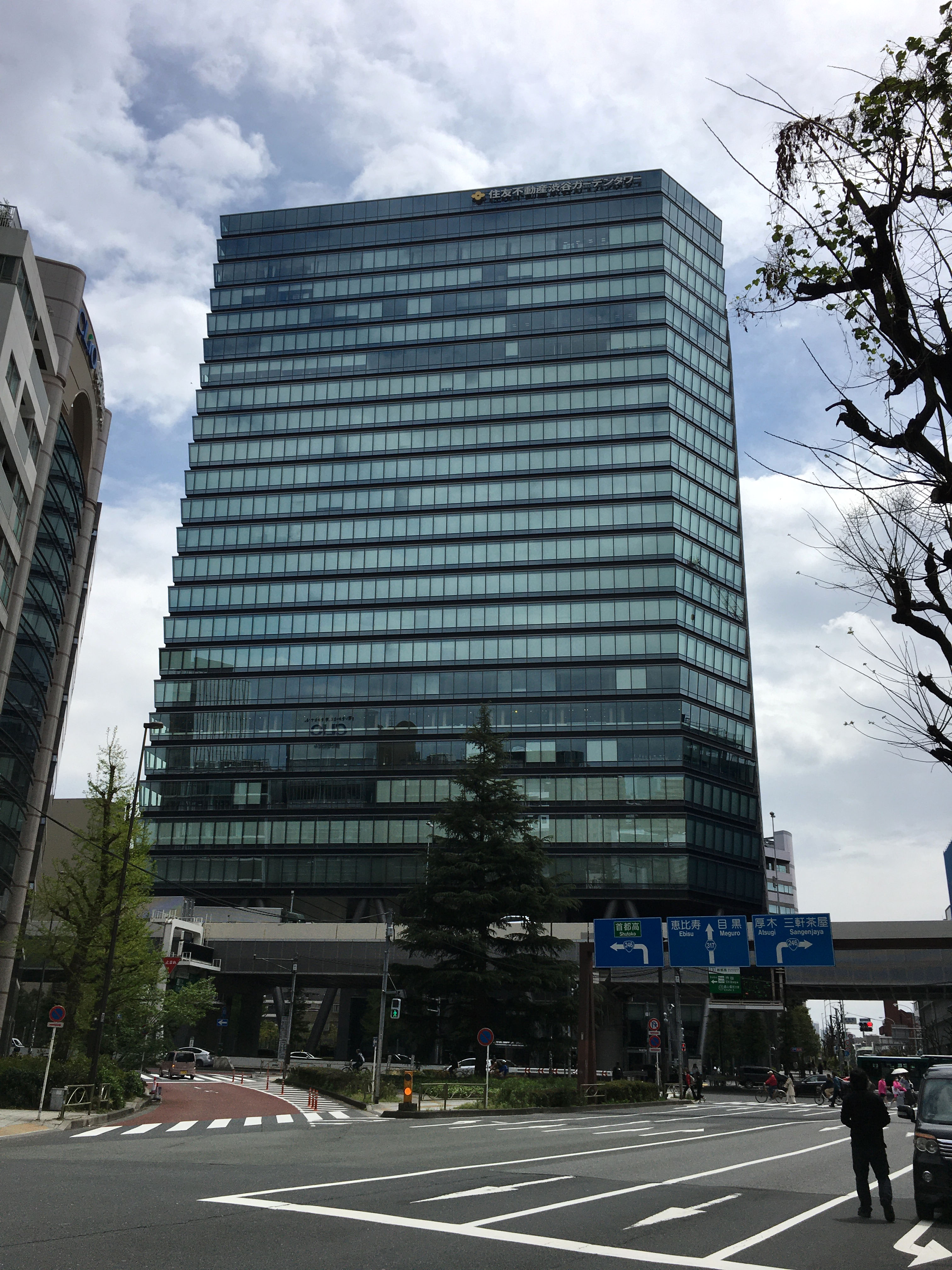
- Headquarters in Setagaya, Tokyo
- Native name: 株式会社円谷プロダクション
- Romanized name: Kabushiki-gaisha Tsuburaya Purodakushon
- Type: Subsidiary
- Industry: Entertainment
- Genre: Tokusatsu
- Predecessor: Tsuburaya Special; Technology Laboratory
- Founded: April 12, 1963
- Founder: Eiji Tsuburaya
- Headquarters: Hachimanyama, Setagaya, Tokyo, Japan
- Key people: Tsuneyuki Morishima, President; Shinichi Ôka, Vice President; Junya Okabe, Vice President
- Products: Television; Movies
- Number of employees: 162
- Parent: Tsuburaya Fields Holdings (51%); Bandai Namco Holdings (49%)
- Website: m-78.jp; tsuburaya-prod.com

Tsuburaya Productions (Japanese: 円谷プロダクション, Hepburn: Tsuburaya Purodakushon), also abbreviated as Tsupro (Japanese: ツプロ, Hepburn: Tsupuro), is a Japanese special effects studio and film and television production company founded in 1963 by special effects director Eiji Tsuburaya and was run by his family, until October 2007, when the family sold the company to advertising agency TYO Inc. The studio is best known for producing the science fiction media franchise Ultraman. Since 2007, the head office has been located in Hachimanyama, Setagaya, Tokyo.

== History ==
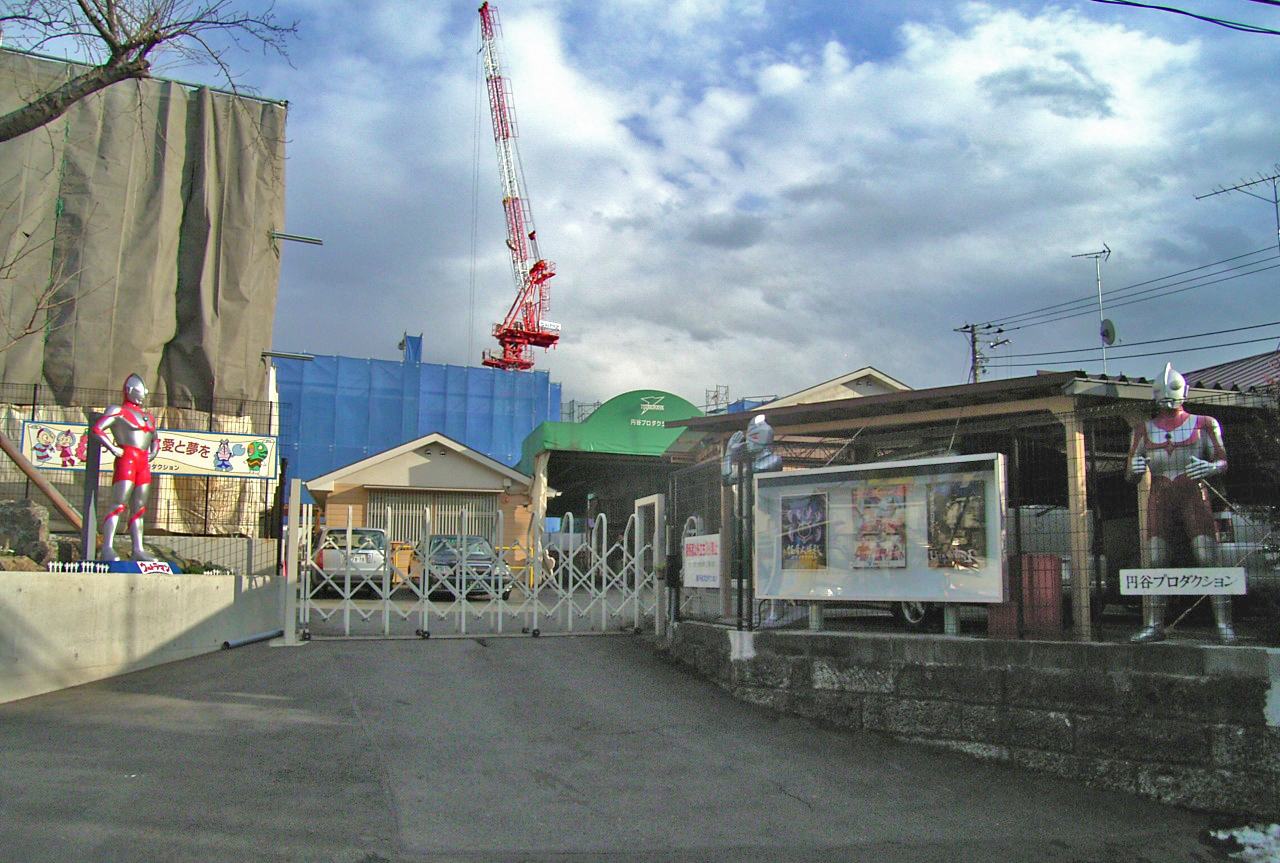
Setagaya, Tokyo – The Kinuta office, which was used by Tsuburaya Productions as the head office from 1964 to 2005. Tsuburaya closed the office on February 6, 2008, and sold it.

First established by Japanese special effects (tokusatsu) pioneer Eiji Tsuburaya in 1963, it was responsible for the creation of such classic shows as Ultraman (and its many sequels), Kaiju Booska and many other spectacular tokusatsu family/children's shows. The company, when first formed in 1963, was called Tsuburaya Special Effects Productions (Japanese: 円谷特技プロダクション, Hepburn: Tsuburaya Tokugi Purodakushon). In 1968, Toho Company Ltd. forced the company to change its name to the simpler "Tsuburaya Productions", not only because its executives thought Eiji was acting as though only he could have done special effects, but also because they felt that his own TV shows were becoming a strong competition to the movies he was doing for them. Although Eiji had strong political power at Toho, he and the company were at odds with each other until his death in 1970.

The company's current logo was originally the arrow-like logo from their 1968 TV series, Mighty Jack, designed by that show's art director, Tohl Narita. Tohl Narita left the company the same year.

Tsuburaya has officially made their Ultraman and non-Ultraman content widely available on their YouTube channel, even simulcasting several of their series with English subtitles, the channel has reached over 2 million subscribers.

Tsuburaya's more recent work includes the "Ultra N-Project" (Ultraman the Next and Ultraman Nexus) based loosely on an unused concept which was planned before the production of Ultra Q, but never actually filmed.

== Corporate buyout ==
In October 2007, due to rising production costs, the Tsuburaya family sold the company to Japanese advertising agency TYO Inc., which then held an 80% stake in the company. Bandai, the main licensor of merchandise for the Ultra Series, acquired a 33.4% stake in 2007 with TYO transferring another 15.6% to Namco Bandai Holdings in 2009 giving Namco Bandai a total of 49.9%. As a result, the old Kinuta office used by Tsuburaya as its head office was razed, and the company moved to newer facilities. Kazuo Tsuburaya, Eiji's grandson, stayed with the company on its board of directors.

In 2010, pachinko maker Fields Corporation bought out TYO's 51% stake in Tsuburaya Productions, with Bandai retaining the remaining 49%.

== Filmography ==
=== Tokusatsu ===
==== Primary ====
Year	Title	Country	Production	Broadcast	First release	Latest release	Upcoming release
1966–present	Ultraman franchise	Japan	TV Tokyo; Dentsu	Saturday; 9:00 (JST)	Ultra Q (1966)	Ultraman Teo (2026)	Untitled Ultraman entry (TBA)

==== Secondary (Other Tokusatsu) ====
- Shin Japan Heroes Universe (2022-present)
- Mighty Jack
- Mirrorman
- Redman
- Fireman
- Jumborg Ace
- Dinosaur War Izenborg
- Dinosaur Corps Koseidon
- Gridman the Hyper Agent
  - Superhuman Samurai Syber-Squad
- Gridman Universe
  - SSSS.Gridman
  - SSSS.Dynazenon
- WoO
- Daicon Film's Return of Ultraman
- The Flying Monster
- Animetal Marathon III
