= 2020 in Japanese television =

Events in 2020 in Japanese television.

Until end of May, most anime series and television dramas had their production suspended due to the pandemic's massive impact on Japanese television since COVID-19 interrupted the production of television series for several weeks to ensure safety of various people who have been involved the previous process of filming.

== Events ==
Date	Event	Source
January 20	Anime creator Shoji Kawamori is named chief creative officer of the Small Worlds theme park.	
February 14	Voice actress and singer Yui Ogura announced that the 'Valentine's Day Party' event had its visitor policy changed due to the spread of the coronavirus.	
August 4	Animation studio Arms Co., Ltd., formerly Dandelion, Triple X (when working on various hentai titles) and Garyū Studio, closes after being filed for bankruptcy in July 22.	

== Ongoing ==
Show	Type	Channel	First aired/Japanese period		Source
NHK
NHK Amateur Song Contest	Talent show	NHK-G, NHK World Premium	March 15, 1953 (TV)	Showa	
With Mother	Kids	E-TV, NHK World Premium	October 5, 1959	Showa	
Nintama Rantarō	Anime	NHK	April 10, 1993	Heisei	
Ojarumaru	Anime	NHK	October 5, 1998	Heisei	
Utacon	Music	NHK-G, NHK World Premium	April 12, 2016	Heisei	
Nippon Television
Soreike! Anpanman	Anime	Nippon Television	October 3, 1988	Showa	
Downtown no Gaki no Tsukai ya Arahende!!	Game show	Nippon Television	October 3, 1989	Heisei	
Detective Conan	Anime	NNS	January 8, 1996	Heisei	
Fuji Television
Music Fair	Music	Fuji Television	August 31, 1964	Showa	
Sazae-san	Anime	Fuji Television	October 5, 1969	Showa	
FNS Music Festival	Music	Fuji Television	July 2, 1974	Showa	
Chibi Maruko-chan	Anime	Fuji Television	January 8, 1995	Heisei	
One Piece	Anime	Fuji Television	October 20, 1999	Heisei	
TV Tokyo
Black Clover	Anime	TV Tokyo	October 3, 2017	Heisei	
Boruto: Naruto Next Generations	Anime	TV Tokyo	April 5, 2017	Heisei	
Kiratto Pri Chan	Anime	TV Tokyo	April 8, 2018	Heisei	
Pokémon (2019 series)	Anime	TV Tokyo	November 17, 2019	Reiwa	
Yo-kai Watch Jam: Yo-kai Academy Y: Encounter with N	Anime	TV Tokyo	December 27, 2019	Reiwa	
TV Asahi
Super Hero Time	Tokusatsu	TV Asahi	September 28, 2003	Heisei	
Panel Quiz Attack 25	Game show	TV Asahi	April 6, 1975	Showa	
Crayon Shin-chan	Anime	TV Asahi	April 13, 1992	Heisei	
Doraemon	Anime	TV Asahi	April 15, 2005	Heisei	
Music Station	Music	TV Asahi	October 24, 1986	Showa	
Tokyo Broadcasting System
SASUKE	Sports	Tokyo Broadcasting System	September 26, 1997	Heisei	
Count Down TV	Music	Tokyo Broadcasting System	April 7, 1993	Heisei	

== New series and returning shows ==
Show	Network	Premiere	Finale	Status	Source
Asteroid in Love	Tokyo MX	January 3, 2020	March 27, 2020	Series Ended	
Darwin's Game	Tokyo MX	January 3, 2020	March 20, 2020	Series Ended	
Magia Record	Tokyo MX	January 4, 2020	March 28, 2020	Series Ended	
ID - Invaded	Tokyo MX	January 5, 2020	March 22, 2020	Series Ended	
Marumaru Manul	Tokyo MX	January 5, 2020	December 15, 2020	Series Ended	
Room Camp	AT-X	January 6, 2020	March 23, 2020	Series Ended	
Pet	Tokyo MX	January 6, 2020	March 30, 2020	Series Ended	
Seton Academy: Join the Pack!	Tokyo MX	January 7, 2020	March 24, 2020	Series Ended	
Sorcerous Stabber Orphen	Tokyo MX	January 7, 2020	March 31, 2020	Season Ended	
BOFURI: I Don't Want to Get Hurt, so I'll Max Out My Defense.	Tokyo MX	January 8, 2020	March 25, 2020	Series Ended	
Hulaing Babies☆Petit	TV Tokyo	January 8, 2020	March 25, 2020	Series Ended	
Drifting Dragons	Fuji TV	January 8, 2020	March 26, 2020	Series Ended	
Plunderer	Tokyo MX	January 8, 2020	June 24, 2020	Series Ended	
Show by Rock!! Mashumairesh!!	Tokyo MX	January 9, 2020	March 26, 2020	Series Ended	
If My Favorite Pop Idol Made It to the Budokan, I Would Die	TBS	January 9, 2020	March 27, 2020	Series Ended	
Uchitama?! Have you seen my Tama?	Fuji TV	January 9, 2020	March 19, 2020	Series Ended	
Hatena Illusion	BS NTV	January 9, 2020	June 3, 2020	Series Ended	
Nekopara	Tokyo MX	January 9, 2020	March 26, 2020	Series Ended	
Somali and the Forest Spirit	Tokyo MX	January 9, 2020	March 26, 2020	Series Ended	
Toilet-Bound Hanako-kun	TBS	January 9, 2020	March 26, 2020	Season Ended	
Infinite Dendrogram	Tokyo MX	January 9, 2020	April 16, 2020	Series Ended	
The Case Files of Jeweler Richard	Tokyo MX	January 9, 2020	March 26, 2020	Series Ended	
Oda Cinnamon Nobunaga	TV Tokyo	January 10, 2020	March 27, 2020	Series Ended	
A Certain Scientific Railgun T	Tokyo MX	January 10, 2020	September 25, 2020	Series Ended	
Laid-Back Camp (live action)	TV Tokyo, TV Osaka, TV Aichi	January 10, 2020	March 27, 2020	Season Ended	
Smile Down the Runway	TBS	January 10, 2020	March 27, 2020	Series Ended	
Science Fell in Love, So I Tried to Prove It	Tokyo MX	January 10, 2020	March 13, 2020	Series Ended	
22/7	Tokyo MX	January 11, 2020	March 28, 2020	Series Ended	
In/Spectre	TV Asahi	January 11, 2020	March 28, 2020	Season Ended	
Ultraman Chronicle Zero & Geed	TV Tokyo	January 11, 2020	June 13, 2020	Series Ended	
Interspecies Reviewers	Tokyo MX	January 11, 2020	March 28, 2020	Series Ended	
A Destructive God Sits Next to Me	Tokyo MX	January 11, 2020	March 28, 2020	Series Ended	
Dorohedoro	Tokyo MX	January 12, 2020	March 29, 2020	Series Ended	
Kirin ga Kuru	NHK	January 19, 2020	February 7, 2021	Ending 2021	
Wasteful Days of High School Girls	TV Asahi	January 24, 2020	March 6, 2020	Series Ended	
Healin' Good PreCure	TV Asahi	February 2, 2020	February 21, 2021	Ending 2021	
Followers	Netflix	February 27, 2020	Currently airing	Continues 2021	
Mashin Sentai Kiramager	TV Asahi	March 8, 2020	February 28, 2021	Ending 2021	
Tamayomi	Tokyo MX	April 1, 2020	June 17, 2020	Series Ended	
Kakushigoto	Tokyo MX	April 2, 2020	June 18, 2020	Series Ended	
Norimono Man Mobile Land no Car-kun	NHK	April 2, 2020	Currently airing	Continues 2021	
Wave, Listen to Me!	TBS	April 3, 2020	June 19, 2020	Series Ended	
Listeners	TBS	April 3, 2020	June 19, 2020	Series Ended	
Sakura Wars: The Animation	Tokyo MX	April 3, 2020	June 19, 2020	Series Ended	
Shachō, Battle no Jikan Desu!	Tokyo MX	April 5, 2020	June 28, 2020	Series Ended	
Gal to Kyōryū	Tokyo MX	April 4, 2020	Currently airing	Continues 2021	
Arte	Tokyo MX	April 4, 2020	June 20, 2020	Series Ended	
Sing "Yesterday" for Me	TV Asahi	April 4, 2020	June 20, 2020	Series Ended	
Yu-Gi-Oh! Sevens	TV Tokyo	April 4, 2020	Currently airing	Continues 2021	
Tsugu Tsugumomo	Tokyo MX	April 4, 2020	June 21, 2020	Season Ended	
Motto! Majime ni Fumajime Kaiketsu Zorori	NHK	April 5, 2020	Currently airing	Continues 2021	
Mewkledreamy	TV Tokyo	April 5, 2020	April 4, 2021	Ending 2021	
Tomica Kizuna Mode Combine Earth Granner	TV Osaka	April 5, 2020	March 28, 2021	Ending 2021	
White Cat Project	Tokyo MX	April 6, 2020	June 22, 2020	Series Ended	
Princess Connect! Re:Dive	Tokyo MX	April 6, 2020	June 29, 2020	Series Ended	
Shadowverse	TV Tokyo	April 7, 2020	March 23, 2021	Ending 2021	
BNA: Brand New Animal	Fuji TV	April 8, 2020	June 24, 2020	Series Ended	
Komatta Jii-san	Nippon TV	April 8, 2020	July 1, 2020	Series Ended	
My Teen Romantic Comedy SNAFU Fin	TBS	April 9, 2020	September 24, 2020	Series Ended	
Fugō Keiji Balance: Unlimited	Fuji TV	April 9, 2020	September 24, 2020	Series Ended	
Argonavis from BanG Dream!	TBS	April 10, 2020	July 3, 2020	Series Ended	
Appare-Ranman!	Tokyo MX	April 10, 2020	September 25, 2020	Series Ended	
Hakushon Daimaō 2020	Nippon TV	April 11, 2020	September 26, 2020	Series Ended	
Woodpecker Detective's Office	Tokyo MX	April 13, 2020	June 29, 2020	Series Ended	
Olympia Kyklos	Tokyo MX	April 20, 2020	November 2, 2020	Series Ended	
Digimon Adventure:	Fuji TV	June 7, 2020 (Note: Originally started on April 5, 2020)	September 26, 2021	Ending 2021	
Ultraman Z	TV Tokyo	June 20, 2020	December 26, 2020	Series Ended	
Fire Force (2nd season)	TBS	July 4, 2020	December 12, 2020	Season Ended	
Lapis Re:Lights	Tokyo MX	July 4, 2020	September 19, 2020	Series Ended	
The God of High School	Tokyo MX	July 6, 2020	September 28, 2020	Series Ended	
Re:Zero − Starting Life in Another World (2nd season)	AT-X	July 8, 2020	March 24, 2021	Ending 2021	
Great Pretender	Fuji TV	July 8, 2020	December 16, 2020	Series Ended	
Uzaki-chan Wants to Hang Out!	Tokyo MX	July 10, 2020	Currently airing	Continues 2021	
Peter Grill and the Philosopher's Time	Tokyo MX	July 11, 2020	September 26, 2020	Series Ended	
Gibiate	Tokyo MX	July 15, 2020	September 30, 2020	Series Ended	
Police × Heroine Lovepatrina!	TV Tokyo	July 26, 2020	June 27, 2021	Ending 2021	
Kamen Rider Saber	TV Asahi	September 6, 2020	August 29, 2021	Ending 2021	
Dragon Quest: The Adventure of Dai	TV Tokyo	October 3, 2020	October 22, 2022	Ending 2022	
The Irregular at Magic High School (2nd season)	Tokyo MX	October 4, 2020	December 27, 2020	Season Ended	
Saikyō Kamizmode	Tokyo MX	October 9, 2020	April 9, 2021	Ending 2021	
24 Japan	TV Asahi	October 9, 2020	March 26, 2021	Ending 2021	
Mr. Osomatsu (Season 3)	TV Tokyo	October 13, 2020	March 30, 2021	Ending 2021	
Attack on Titan (Final season, Part 1)	TBS, NHK	December 7, 2020	March 29, 2021	Season Ended; Renewed for Final Season (Part 2)	
Alice in Borderland	Netflix	December 10, 2020	Currently airing	Continues 2021	

== Ending ==
End date	Show	Channel	First aired	Replaced by	Source
January 26	Star Twinkle PreCure	TV Asahi	February 3, 2019	Healin' Good PreCure	
March 1	Kishiryu Sentai Ryusoulger	TV Asahi	March 17, 2019	Mashin Sentai Kiramager	
March 28	Aikatsu on Parade!	TV Tokyo	October 5, 2019	JAPAN COUNTDOWN	
March 28	Scarlet	NHK	September 30, 2019	Yell (TV series)	
March 29	GeGeGe no Kitaro	Fuji TV	April 1, 2018	Digimon Adventure:	
March 31	Ace of Diamond Act II	TV Tokyo	April 2, 2019	Shadowverse	
June 28	Secret × Heroine Phantomirage!	TV Tokyo	April 7, 2019	Police × Heroine Lovepatrina!	
August 30	Kamen Rider Zero-One	TV Asahi	September 1, 2019	Kamen Rider Saber	
November 27	Yell	NHK	March 30, 2020	Ochoyan	
December 26	Ultraman Z	TV Tokyo	June 20, 2020	Ultraman Chronicle Z: Heroes' Odyssey	

== Special events and milestone episodes ==
Airdate	Show	Episode	Network	Source
January 19	Chibi Maruko-chan	30th anniversary 1-hour special:"The Adventure of Maruko and Tama-chan"/"Tarō on a Particular Day"	Fuji TV	
December 31	71st NHK Kōhaku Uta Gassen		NHK	
December 31	Johnny's Countdown 2020-2021		Fuji Television	

== Deaths ==
Date	Name	Age	Notable Works	Source
January 2	Shōzō Uehara	82	Screenwriter (Super Sentai, Ultraman)	
January 9	Yūji Yamaguchi		Anime director (AM Driver, Smile PreCure!)	
January 11	Takeo Tabata	81	Actor	
January 19	Chisako Hara	84	Actress	
January 20	Izumi Tanaka|ja|	88	Television company president (TBS)	
January 31	Katsumasa Uchida	75	Actor	
February 6	Kitamura Saburo	82	Run! K100	
February 13	Ai Kidosaki	94	Chef on the Kyō no Ryōri cooking programme.	
February 13	Yoshisada Sakaguchi	80	Actor, voice actor (Alexander Senki)	
March 29	Ken Shimura	70	Comedian, television personality	
April 23	Keiji Fujiwara	55	Voice actor (Magi: The Labyrinth of Magic, One Piece), dubbing actor (TUGS, Beast Wars: Transformers)	
April 23	Kumiko Okae	63	Actress, voice actress, television presenter	
May 23	Hana Kimura	22	Former Japanese wrestler, acted on Netflix original series Terrace House: Tokyo 2019–2020.	
July 18	Haruma Miura	30	Actor	
August 29	Maria Hamasaki	23	Model	
September 14	Sei Ashina	36	Actress	
September 21	Takashi Fujiki	80	Actor	
September 27	Yuko Takeuchi	40	Actress	
September 27	Kōsei Tomita	84	Voice actor (Doraemon)	

== See also ==
- 2020 in British television (Brexit)
- 2020 in television
