= 2021 in Japanese television =

Below is a list of events affecting Japanese television in 2021.

== Events ==
Date	Event	Source
February 1	Japan's Disney XD channel closes.	
March 15	The 73rd episode of Attack on Titan is postponed to March 21, when it airs along with its 74th episode, due to an earthquake in Yuasua, Wakayama, Japan.	
March 16	Singer and voice actress Nana Mizuki gives birth to her first child.	
April 7	Ahead of its premiere on April 10, anime series The World Ends with You the Animation has its opening song replaced due to the ALI drummer's arrest.	
June 18	Anime studio Toei Animation dissolves coyote anime studio.	
June 25	The 24th and final episode of So I'm a Spider, So What? was postponed indefinitely due to production issues.	
July 14	As warned by the NHK staff, broadcasting delays of several anime shows have been occurred due to both the Olympics and the Paralympics.	
July 23 – August 8	The 2020 Summer Olympics was held in Tokyo, Japan.	
August 9	The Idolm@ster voice actress Asami Shimoda announces the birth of her baby boy.	
August 24 - September 5	The 2020 Summer Paralympics was held in Tokyo, Japan.	
September 7	TV Tokyo announces a new anime programming block, Anime Zone, which will air from Mondays through Wednesdays, starting in October.	

== Ongoing ==
Show	Type	Channel	First aired/Japanese period		Source
NHK
NHK Amateur Song Contest	Talent show	NHK-G, NHK World Premium	March 15, 1953 (TV)	Showa	
With Mother	Kids	E-TV, NHK World Premium	October 5, 1959	Showa	
Nintama Rantarō	Anime	NHK	April 10, 1993	Heisei	
Ojarumaru	Anime	NHK	October 5, 1998	Heisei	
Utacon	Music	NHK-G, NHK World Premium	April 12, 2016	Heisei	
Norimono Man Mobile Land no Car-kun	Anime	NHK-E	April 2, 2020	Reiwa	
Nippon Television Network System
Shōten	Comedy	Nippon Television	May 15, 1966	Showa	
Soreike! Anpanman	Anime	Nippon Television	October 3, 1988	Showa	
Downtown no Gaki no Tsukai ya Arahende!!	Game show	Nippon Television	October 3, 1989	Heisei	
Detective Conan	Anime	NNS	January 8, 1996	Heisei	
Fuji Network System
Music Fair	Music	Fuji TV	August 31, 1964	Showa	
Sazae-san	Anime	Fuji TV	October 5, 1969	Showa	
FNS Music Festival	Music	FNS	July 2, 1974	Showa	
Chibi Maruko-chan	Anime	Fuji TV	January 8, 1995	Heisei	
One Piece	Anime	Fuji TV	October 20, 1999	Heisei	
TV Tokyo
Boruto: Naruto Next Generations	Anime	TV Tokyo	April 5, 2017	Heisei	
Pokémon	Anime	TV Tokyo	November 17, 2019	Reiwa	
TV Asahi
Super Hero Time	Tokusatsu	TV Asahi	September 28, 2003	Heisei	
Crayon Shin-chan	Anime	TV Asahi	April 13, 1992	Heisei	
Doraemon	Anime	TV Asahi	April 15, 2005	Heisei	
Music Station	Music	TV Asahi	October 24, 1986	Showa	
Tokyo Broadcasting System
SASUKE	Sports	Tokyo Broadcasting System	September 26, 1997	Heisei	
Count Down TV	Music	Tokyo Broadcasting System	April 7, 1993	Heisei	

== New series and returning shows ==
Show	Network	Premiere	Finale	Status	Source
Suppose a Kid from the Last Dungeon Boonies Moved to a Starter Town	Tokyo MX	January 4, 2021	March 22, 2021	Series Ended	
LBX Girls	Tokyo MX	January 7, 2021	March 25, 2021	Series Ended	
The Quintessential Quintuplets (season 2)	TBS	January 8, 2021	March 26, 2021	Season Ended; Renewed for 3rd Season	
So I'm a Spider, So What?	Tokyo MX	January 8, 2021	July 3, 2021	Series Ended	
WIXOSS Diva(A)Live	Tokyo MX	January 9, 2021	March 27, 2021	Series Ended	
Ultraman Chronicle Z: Heroes' Odyssey	TV Tokyo	January 9, 2021	June 26, 2021	Series Ended	
World Trigger (season 2)	TV Asahi	January 10, 2021	April 4, 2021	Season Ended; Renewed for 3rd season	
Aikatsu Planet!	TV Tokyo	January 10, 2021	June 27, 2021	Series Ended	
SK8 the Infinity	TV Asahi	January 10, 2021	April 4, 2021	Series Ended	
Idoly Pride	Tokyo MX	January 10, 2021	March 28, 2021	Series Ended	
Cells at Work! Code Black	Tokyo MX	January 10, 2021	March 21, 2021	Series Ended	
Horimiya	Tokyo MX	January 10, 2021	April 4, 2021	Series Ended	
Ex-Arm	Tokyo MX	January 11, 2021	March 29, 2021	Series Ended	
That Time I Got Reincarnated as a Slime (season 2)	Tokyo MX	January 12, 2021	September 21, 2021	Season Ended; Renewed for 3rd Season	
Azur Lane: Slow Ahead!	Tokyo MX	January 12, 2021	March 30, 2021	Season Ended	
Log Horizon: Destruction of the Round Table	NHK	January 13, 2021	March 31, 2021	Season Ended	
The Seven Deadly Sins: Dragon's Judgement	TV Tokyo	January 13, 2021	June 23, 2021	Season Ended	
Dr. Stone: Stone Wars	Tokyo MX	January 14, 2021	March 25, 2021	Season Ended; Renewed for 3rd season	
Sorcerous Stabber Orphen: Battle of Kimluck	Tokyo MX	January 20, 2021	March 31, 2021	Season Ended	
Seiten wo Tsuke	NHK	February 14, 2021	December 26, 2021	Series Ended	
Hori-san to Miyamura-kun (Live-action series)	TBS	February 17, 2021	March 31, 2021	Series Ended	
Kiyo in Kyoto: From the Maiko House (NHK World airing)	NHK World	February 25, 2021	January 27, 2022	Ending 2022	
Tropical-Rouge! Pretty Cure	TV Asahi	February 28, 2021	January 30, 2022	Ending 2022	
Kikai Sentai Zenkaiger	TV Asahi	March 7, 2021	February 27, 2022	Ending 2022	
Zettai BL ni Naru Sekai VS Zettai BL ni Naritakunai Otoko	TV Asahi	March 27, 2021	March 20, 2022	Series Ended	
Shaman King (2021 series)	TV Tokyo	April 1, 2021	April 21, 2022	Ending 2022	
Colorful Love: Genderless Danshi ni Aisareteimasu	NTV	April 1, 2021	June 4, 2021	Series Ended	
Beyblade Burst Dynamite Battle	YouTube	April 2, 2021	March 18, 2022	Ending 2022	
Bakugan: Geogan Rising	YouTube	April 2, 2021	March 18, 2022	Season Ended	
Let's Make a Mug Too	CBC	April 3, 2021	June 21, 2021	Season Ended	
Mazica Party	TV Osaka	April 4, 2021	March 27, 2022	Ending 2022	
Odd Taxi	TV Tokyo	April 5, 2021	June 29, 2021	Season Ended	
Fruits Basket: The Final	TV Tokyo	April 5, 2021	June 29, 2021	Series Ended	
The Slime Diaries: That Time I Got Reincarnated as a Slime	Tokyo MX	April 6, 2021	June 22, 2021	Series Ended	
Joran: The Princess of Snow and Blood	NTV	April 6, 2021	June 23, 2021	Series Ended	
Mars Red	Nippon TV, Tokyo MX	April 6, 2021	June 29, 2021	Series Ended	
Iii Icecrin	TV Tokyo	April 6, 2021	December 21, 2021	Season Ended; Renewed for 2nd season	
Fairy Ranmaru	Tokyo MX	April 8, 2021	June 24, 2021	Series Ended	
Zombie Land Saga Revenge	Tokyo MX	April 8, 2021	June 24, 2021	Season Ended	
Shinkansen Henkei Robo Shinkalion Z	TV Tokyo	April 9, 2021	March 18, 2022	Ending 2022	
Yo-Kai Watch (2021 series) (Note: Officially known as Yo-kai Watch♪)	TV Tokyo	April 9, 2021	Currently Airing	Continues 2022	
Don't Toy With Me, Miss Nagatoro	Tokyo MX	April 10, 2021	June 27, 2021	Season Ended	
I've Been Killing Slimes for 300 Years and Maxed Out My Level	Tokyo MX	April 10, 2021	June 26, 2021	Season Ended; Renewed for 2nd season	
The World Ends with You the Animation	TBS	April 10, 2021	June 26, 2021	Series Ended	
Pretty Boy Detective Club	TV Asahi	April 11, 2021	June 27, 2021	Series Ended	
Mewkledreamy Mix!	TV Tokyo	April 11, 2021	March 27, 2022	Ending 2022	
Tokyo Revengers	TV Tokyo	April 11, 2021	September 19, 2021	Season Ended	
To Your Eternity	NHK	April 12, 2021	August 30, 2021	Season Ended	
Gloomy The Naughty Grizzly	Tokyo MX	April 12, 2021	June 28, 2021	Series Ended	
The Family (2021 series)	Wowow	April 18, 2021	July 11, 2021	Series Ended	
Ano Toki Kisu Shite Okeba	TV Asahi	April 30, 2021	Currently Airing	Continues 2022	
Okaeri Mone	NHK	May 17, 2021	October 29, 2021	Series Ended	
Pretty All Friends Selection	TV Tokyo	June 6, 2021	September 19, 2021	Series Ended	
Girlfriend, Girlfriend	TBS	July 2, 2021	September 18, 2021	Season Ended	
My Next Life as a Villainess: All Routes Lead to Doom! (season 2)	Tokyo MX	July 2, 2021	September 18, 2021	Season Ended	
The Honor Student at Magic High School	Tokyo MX	July 3, 2021	September 25, 2021	Series Ended	
Drugstore in Another World	Tokyo MX	July 7, 2021	September 22, 2021	Series Ended	
Police in a Pod (Live-action series)	Nippon TV	July 7, 2021	September 15, 2021	Series Ended	
Ultraman Trigger	TV Tokyo	July 10, 2021	January 22, 2022	Ending 2022	
Bittomo × Heroine Kirameki Powers!	TV Tokyo	July 11, 2021	June 26, 2022	Ending 2022	
Love Live! Superstar!!	NHK-E	July 11, 2021	October 17, 2021	Season Ended; Renewed for Season 2	
The Idaten Deities Know Only Peace	Fuji TV	July 23, 2021	October 1, 2021	Series Ended	
The Masked Singer Japan	Amazon Prime Video	September 3, 2021	October 15, 2021	Season Ended	
Kamen Rider Revice	TV Asahi	September 5, 2021	August 28, 2022	Ending 2022	
Komi Can't Communicate (Live-action series)	NHK	September 6, 2021	November 1, 2021	Series Ended	
Pokémon Evolutions	YouTube	September 9, 2021	December 23, 2021	Series Ended	
Megaton Musashi	Tokyo MX	October 1, 2021	December 24, 2021	Season Ended; Renewed for 2nd Season	
Kimi to Fit Boxing	Tokyo MX	October 1, 2021	December 17, 2021	Series Ended	
Restaurant to Another World (Season 2)	TV Tokyo	October 1, 2021	December 18, 2021	Series Ended	
Yuki Yuna is a Hero: The Great Mankai Chapter	TBS	October 1, 2021	December 18, 2021	Season Ended	
Record of Ragnarok	Tokyo MX	October 1, 2021	December 17, 2021	Season Ended; Renewed for 2nd Season	
Let's Make a Mug Too: Second Kiln	CBC	October 1, 2021	December 18, 2021	Series Ended	
Selection Project	Tokyo MX	October 1, 2021	December 24, 2021	Series Ended	
Yashahime: Princess Half-Demon (season 2)	Nippon TV	October 2, 2021	March 26, 2022	Ending 2022	
Muteking the Dancing Hero	TV Osaka	October 2, 2021	December 19, 2021	Series Ended	
Kiyo in Kyoto: From the Maiko House (NHK E airing)	NHK E	October 2, 2021	June 11, 2022	Series Ended	
Gunma-chan	Tokyo MX	October 3, 2021	December 26, 2021	Series Ended	
Waccha PriMagi!	TV Tokyo	October 3, 2021	October 9, 2022	Ending 2022	
Record of Ragnarok (Mini-anime series)	Cartoon Network Japan	October 3, 2021	December 19, 2021	Series Ended	
Digimon Ghost Game	Fuji TV	October 3, 2021	Currently Airing	Continues 2022	
The Vampire Dies in No Time	Tokyo MX	October 4, 2021	December 20, 2021	Season Ended; Renewed for 2nd Season	
Who Is Princess?	NTV	October 5, 2021	January 23, 2022	Ending 2022	
Komi Can't Communicate (Anime series)	TV Tokyo	October 6, 2021	December 23, 2021	Season Ended; Renewed for 2nd Season	
Muv-Luv Alternative	Fuji TV	October 6, 2021	December 23, 2021	Season Ended; Renewed for 2nd Season	
PuraOre! Pride of Orange	Tokyo MX	October 6, 2021	December 22, 2021	Series Ended	
Banished From The Heroes' Party	Tokyo MX	October 6, 2021	December 29, 2021	Season Ended	
The World's Finest Assassin Gets Reincarnated in a Different World as an Aristocrat	Tokyo MX	October 6, 2021	December 22, 2021	Series Ended	
Visual Prison	Tokyo MX	October 8, 2021	December 25, 2021	Series Ended	
Platinum End	TBS	October 8, 2021	March 25, 2022	Ending 2022	
World Trigger (Season 3)	TV Asahi	October 9, 2021	January 15, 2022	Series Ended	
The Faraway Paladin	Tokyo MX	October 9, 2021	January 3, 2022	Season Ended; Renewed for 2nd Season	
My Senpai Is Annoying	Tokyo MX	October 10, 2021	December 26, 2021	Series Ended	
Demon Slayer: Kimetsu no Yaiba (2nd season)	Fuji TV	October 10, 2021	February 13, 2022	Ending 2022	
Kaginado	Tokyo MX	October 12, 2021	December 29, 2021	Season Ended; Renewed for 2nd Season	
Ranking of Kings	Fuji TV	October 15, 2021	March 25, 2022	Ending 2022	
Come Come Everybody	NHK	November 1, 2021	April 8, 2022	Ending 2022	

== Ending ==
End date	Show	Channel	First aired	Replaced by	Source
February 7	Kirin ga Kuru	NHK	January 19, 2020	Seiten wo Tsuke	
February 21	Healin' Good PreCure	TV Asahi	February 2, 2020	Tropical-Rouge! Pretty Cure	
February 28	Mashin Sentai Kiramager	TV Asahi	March 8, 2020	Kikai Sentai Zenkaiger	
March 23	Shadowverse	TV Tokyo	April 7, 2020	TBA	
March 26	24 Japan	TV Asahi	October 9, 2020	Ano Toki Kisu Shite Okeba	
March 26	Tokudane!	Fuji TV	April 1, 1999	Mezamashi 8	
March 28	Tomica Kizuna Mode Combine Earth Granner	TV Osaka	April 5, 2020	Mazica Party	
March 30	Black Clover	TV Tokyo	October 3, 2017	Kayō Enta	
April 2	Yo-kai Watch Jam: Yo-kai Academy Y: Encounter with N	TV Tokyo	December 27, 2019	Yo-Kai Watch (2021 series)	
April 4	Mewkledreamy	TV Tokyo	April 5, 2020	Mewkledreamy Mix!	
April 9	Saikyō Kamizmode	Tokyo MX	October 9, 2020	TBA	
May 15	Ochoyan	NHK	November 30, 2020	Okaeri Mone	
May 30	Kiratto Pri Chan	TV Tokyo	April 8, 2018	Pretty All Friends Selection	
June 26	Ultraman Chronicle Z: Heroes' Odyssey	TV Tokyo	January 9, 2021	Ultraman Trigger	
June 27	Police × Heroine Lovepatrina!	TV Tokyo	July 26, 2020	Bittomo × Heroine Kirameki Powers!	
August 30	Kamen Rider Saber	TV Asahi	September 6, 2020	Kamen Rider Revice	
September 14	Shiawase! Bonbi Girl	NHK	April 20, 2011	TBA	
September 19	Pretty All Friends Selection	TV Tokyo	June 6, 2021	Waccha PriMagi	
September 26	Digimon Adventure:	Fuji TV	April 5, 2020 (Note: Restarted broadcast on June 7, 2020)	Digimon Ghost Game	
September 26	Panel Quiz Attack 25	TV Asahi	April 6, 1975	Anata no Kawarini Mite Kimasu! Riatsuki WEST	
October 1	The Idaten Deities Know Only Peace	Fuji TV	July 23, 2021	Ranking of Kings	
October 29	Okaeri Mone	NHK	May 17, 2021	Come Come Everybody	
December 18	Yuki Yuna is a Hero: The Great Mankai Chapter	TBS	October 2, 2021	Cue!	
December 26	Seiten wo Tsuke	NHK	February 14, 2021	The 13 Lords of the Shogun	

== Sports ==
Airdate	Sports	Network	Source
July 23 - August 8	Tokyo 2020 Olympics	NHK	
August 24 - September 5	Tokyo 2020 Paralympics	NHK	

== Special events and milestone episodes ==
Airdate	Show	Episode	Network	Source
June 12	My Hero Academia	#100: The New Power and All For One	Nippon Television	
July 18	Kamen Rider Saber	Movie Cross-Over SP: The World Pirate Comes, and the Worlds Mix.	TV Asahi	
July 18	Kikai Sentai Zenkaiger	#20: Swordsman and World Pirate, a Brother's Promise. (Movie Crossover Special)	TV Asahi	
September 4	Doraemon	Birthday special episode	TV Asahi	
November 21	One Piece	#1000: "Overwhelming Strength! The Straw Hats Come Together!"	Fuji Television	
December 3 - December 10	Pokémon	Diamond & Pearl special	TV Tokyo	
December 31	The Irregular at Magic High School	The Magic at Irregular High School	Tokyo MX	
December 31	72nd NHK Kōhaku Uta Gassen		NHK	
December 31	Johnny's Countdown 2021-2022		Fuji Television	

== Deaths ==
Date	Name	Age	Notable Works	Source
January 1	Seizō Fukumoto	77	Actor (Juuken Sentai Gekiranger)	
February 8	Shūichirō Moriyama	86	Voice actor (Tiger Mask, Digimon Tamers), dubbing actor	
February 17	Tetsurō Sagawa	84	Actor (Ultraman Ace)	
February 25	Masako Sugaya	83	Voice actress (Perman, Astro Boy, Superbook, Ranma ½)	
March 14	Minako Shiba	50	Animator, character designer, animation director, illustrator (Black Butler, Detective Conan, Dr. Stone)	
March 15	Yasuo Otsuka	89	Anime creator (The Wonderful World of Puss 'n Boots)	
March 15	Masahiro Anzai	66	Voice actor (Sailor Moon, Anpanman, Magical Angel Creamy Mami)	
April 3	Masakazu Tamura	77	Actor (Naruto Hitcho, Nemuri Kyoshirō The Final, Furuhata Ninzaburō)	
April 16	Osamu Kobayashi	57	Director (Paradise Kiss, BECK: Mongolian Chop Squad)	
April 16	Fumio Hisamatsu	77	Original creator (Bōken Gabotenjima), animator (Shōnen Ninja Kaze no Fujimaru, Mirai Kara Shōnen Super Jetter)	
April 24	Shunsuke Kikuchi	89	Composer (Dragon Ball, Dr. Slump, Tiger Mask, Doraemon)	
April 25	Toshiro Kandagawa	81	Chef contestant (Iron Chef)	
May 6	Kentarou Miura	54	Original creator (Berserk)	
May 10	Sugako Hashida	95	Scriptwriter (Oshin)	
May 15	Akira Itou	80	Theme song composer (Urusei Yatsura)	
May 18	Genzo Wakayama	88	Voice actor (Treasure Island)	
May 30	Haruka Nagashima	33	Voice actress (Shiki, Sparrow's Hotel)	
May 30	Asei Kobayashi	88	Composer (Sally the Witch, Gatchaman), voice actor	
July 31	Sanpei Satō	91	Original creator (Dotanba no Manners)	
August 1	Masami Suda	77	Animator (Gatchaman, Fist of the North Star)	
August 14	Mary Fujishima	93	Chairperson of Johnny & Associates	
August 14	Jerry Fujio	81	Actor (The Hit Parade), voice actor (The Stingiest Man in Town)	
August 19	Sonny Chiba	82	Actor (Fūrin Kazan)	
August 21	Masanari Nihei	80	Actor (Ultraman), voice actor (The Ultraman)	
September 3	Shinichiro Sawai	83	Series director (Shogun no Onmitsu! Kage Juhachi, Juukou B-Fighter)	
September 7	Eiichi Yamamoto	80	Animator, episode director (Astro Boy), director (Kimba the White Lion, Wansa-kun)	
September 9	Yūshi Suzuki		Director (Edens Zero)	
September 24	Takao Saito	84	Original creator (Golgo 13)	
September 30	Koichi Sugiyama	90	Composer (Cyborg 009, Magic Knight Rayearth, Dragon Quest: The Adventure of Dai)	
October 8	Sanpei Shirato	89	Original creator (Ninpu Kamui Gaiden)	
October 12	Daisei Fujii		Character designer (SD Gundam Force, Super Robot Wars OG: Divine Wars)	
October 17	Toshihiro Iijima	89	Director (Ultraman, Ultra Q, Ultraman Max)	
October 21	Saori Sugimoto	58	Voice actress (Nintama Rantaro, Mobile Suit Gundam Wing)	
October 29	Yoshiko Oota	89	Voice actress (Kimba the White Lion, Doraemon (1979 TV series))	
November 5	Kinji Yoshimoto	55	Director (Queen's Blade: The Exiled Virgin, Unbreakable Machine-Doll), animator	
December 1	Keiko Nobumoto	57	Screenwriter (Cowboy Bebop, Macross Plus)	
December 3	Jouji Yanami	90	Voice actor (Dragon Ball, Dragon Ball Z)	
December 8	Mitsutoshi Furuya	85	Original creator (Gūtara Mama, Dame Oyaji)	
December 18	Sayaka Kanda	35	Voice actress and singer	

== See also ==
- 2021 in British television (Brexit)
- 2021 in television
