= List of Ultraman Geed characters =

This is a character list of the 2017 Ultra Series Ultraman Geed.

== Nebula House ==
The Neo Britannia (ネオブリタニア号, Neo Buritania-gō) is a Sturm spaceship that originally belonged to Kei and buried 500 meters beneath the astronomical observatory, serving as a home and base to Riku who becomes its current owner and named it the Nebula House (星雲荘, Seiun-sō) after his former residential area.

=== Riku Asakura/Ultraman Geed ===
Riku Asakura (朝倉 リク, Asakura Riku) (Note: His given name is written in kanji as "陸".) is the 19-year-old protagonist of the series. A teenager with no knowledge of his past, he was found nearby the astronomical observatory as a baby and lived a normal life until his home and workplace were destroyed by Skull Gomora. Riku stumbles into the Nebula House while considering spending the night at the observatory where he learns of his true nature as an Ultraman. Riku designates himself as Ultraman Geed (ウルトラマンジード, Urutoraman Jīdo) from his daily principle "Sitting around doing nothing won't get me anywhere!" (ジーッとしててもドーにもならねえ！, Jītto shite temo dō nimo naranē!), later explaining that the name also comes from the first two letters of Gene (ジーン, Jīn) and the first two letters of Destiny (デスティニー, Desutinī) in reversed order. Although terrified of his background as the "son of Belial" (ベリアルの息子, Beriaru no Musuko), a clone of Belial created by Kei to orchestrate the villain's return, Riku refuses to accept his fate while living up to his childhood inspiration as a hero. In the series finale, he finally face against his father in a battle that puts the fate of the universe at stake. The assistance from Ultraman King allows him to bring forth copies of his Fusion Rise forms as reinforcements. Once both are in their original forms, Geed and Belial fought to a standstill before trying to understand the pain and suffering that his father endured ever since being banished from the Land of Light. Unfortunately as Belial was beyond all help, Geed puts him to rest with his finisher. In the aftermath of the battle, Geed is finally recognized as the public hero as Riku resumed his normal life.

Being an Ultra Warrior in disguise, Riku possesses the Belial Factor that allows him to perform multiple inhuman feats. As Ultraman Geed, he transforms via the Riser (ライザー, Raizā) (which he renames the Geed Riser (ジードライザー, Jīdo Raizā)) and Loading Knuckle (装填ナックル, Sōten Nakkuru), the latter device serves as a communicator to RE.M. His operation time is 3 minutes and can only transform after 20 hours. After his renewed confidence, Geed gains a weapon called the Geed Claw (ジードクロー, Jīdo Kurō).

His original form is in fact an exact copy of his father's Early Style, save for its Color Timer. This forms is usually glimpsed during his Fusion Rise and is also shown at the series finale. By scanning a pair of Ultra Capsules (ウルトラカプセル, Urutora Kapuseru), it allows Geed to Fusion Rise (フュージョンライズ, Fyūjon Raizu) into preferred forms:

- Primitive (プリミティブ, Purimitibu): Geed's default form based on Ultraman and Ultraman Belial. Despite being balanced in terms of performances, he is capable of exerting the full potential of his inner strength should he consumed by his own rage and is able to fight on par with Belial. Although presented as a berserker-type fighter like his father, Geed retains the original Ultraman's heart of justice. His finisher in this form is the Wrecking Burst (レッキングバースト, Rekkingu Bāsuto).
- Solid Burning (ソリッドバーニング, Soriddo Bāningu): Geed's strength form based on Ultraseven and Ultraman Leo. In this form, Geed wields the Geed Slugger (ジードスラッガー, Jīdo Suraggā) on his head and his finisher is the Strike Boost (ストライクブースト, Sutoraiku Būsuto).
- Acro Smasher (アクロスマッシャー, Akuro Sumasshā): Geed's speed form based on Ultraman Hikari and Ultraman Cosmos. In this form, Geed is capable of drawing the Smash Beam Blade (スマッシュビームブレード, Sumasshu Bīmu Burēdo) from his right hand as well as releasing an anesthetic wave called the Smash Moon Healing (スマッシュムーンヒーリング, Sumasshu Mūn Hīringu).
- Magnificent (マグニフィセント, Magunifisento): Geed's super form based on Ultraman Zero and Father of Ultra. His finisher in this form is the Big Burst Away (ビッグバスタウェイ, Biggu Basutawei).
- Royal Megamaster (ロイヤルメガマスター, Roiyaru Megamasutā): Geed's ultimate Fusion Rise form based on Ultraman King and Ultraman Belial. Unlike other Fusion Rises, Riku transforms into this form using the King Sword (キングソード, Kingu Sōdo) which is summoned after scanning both Capsules. While his primary finishing attack is the Royal End (ロイヤルエンド, Roiyaru Endo), Geed Royal Megamaster uses the Ultraman Capsules with the King Sword for additional attacks.

In Ultraman Geed the Movie, Geed obtains a new ultimate form called Ultimate Final (ウルティメイトファイナル, Urutimeito Fainaru) that he assumes by using the Evolution Capsule and a pole-arm known as Giga Finalizer (ギガファイナライザー, Giga Fainaraizā), a weapon that was created on Planet Kushia whose residents called it "Red Steel" (赤き鋼, Akaki Hagane). His strongest finisher in this form is Crescent Final Geed (クレセントファイナルジード, Kuresento Fainaru Jīdo).

In addition, the Data Carddass game Ultraman Fusion Fight! also introduced game-exclusive Fusion Rise. By inserting two Ultra Capsules into the arcade machine, players can utilize the Fusion exclusively in a finisher.

- Shining Mystic (シャイニングミスティック, Shainingu Misutikku): Based on Ultraman and Shining Ultraman Zero. His finisher in this form is the Spacium Star Drive (スペシウムスタードライブ, Supeshiumu Sutā Doraibu).
- Tri-Slugger (トライスラッガー, Torai Suraggā): Based on Ultraman Belial and Ultraman Orb Emerium Slugger. His finisher in this form is the Reflect Slugger (リフレクトスラッガー, Rifurekuto Suraggā).
- Mugen Crosser (ムゲンクロッサー, Mugen Kurossā; Phantom Crosser): Based on Ultraman Tiga and Ultraman Zero Luna-Miracle Zero. Geed is armed with the Zero Twin-Sword Neo (ゼロツインソード・ネオ, Zero Tsuin Sōdo Neo) and his finisher is the Magical Trident Slash (マジカルトライデントスラッシュ, Majikaru Toraidento Surasshu).
- Brave Challenger (ブレイブチャレンジャー, Bureibu Charenjā): Based on Ultraman Mebius and Ultraman Orb Specium Zeperion. His finisher in this form is the Mebium Giga Light Ring (メビュームギガ光輪, Mebyūmu Giga Kōrin).
- Fire Leader (ファイヤーリーダー, Faiyā Rīdā): Based on Zoffy and Ultraman Mebius. His finisher in this form is the Burning Frost (バーニングフロスト, Bāningu Furosuto).
- Le-Over Fist (リーオーバーフィスト, Rīōbā Fisuto): Based on Ultraman Leo and Astra. His finisher in this form is the Burning Over Kick (バーニングオーバーキック, Bāningu Ōbā Kikku).
- Mighty Trekker (マイティトレッカー, Maiti Torekkā): Based on Ultraman Dyna and Ultraman Cosmos. His finisher in this form is the Flame Compression Wave (フレイムコンプレッションウェーブ, Fureimu Konpuresshon Wēbu).
- Photon Knight (フォトンナイト, Foton Naito): Based on Ultraman Gaia (V2) and Ultraman Hikari. His finisher in this form is the Knight Stream (ナイトストリーム, Naito Sutorīmu).
- Dandit Truth (ダンディットトゥルース, Danditto Turūsu): Based on Father of Ultra and Ultraman Belial. His finisher in this form is the Blazer Banishing (ブレイザーバニシング, Bureizā Banishingu).
- Noactive Succeed (ノアクティブサクシード, Noakutibu Sakushīdo): Based on Ultraman Nexus Junis and Ultimate Zero. His finisher in this form is the Sword Ray Overdrive (ソードレイ・オーバードライヴ, Sōdo Rei Ōbādoraivu).

Riku Asakura is portrayed by Tatsuomi Hamada (濱田 龍臣, Hamada Tatsuomi), previously portraying Nao in Ultraman Zero: The Revenge of Belial. As a child, Riku is portrayed by Tōya Shimizu (志水 透哉, Shimizu Tōya). Meanwhile, the Geed Riser is voiced by Nobuyuki Hiyama (檜山 修之, Hiyama Nobuyuki).

According to Koichi Sakamoto, Geed's status as a hero who inherited the blood of a villain is comparable to the titular character of Devilman. Riku Asakura's name is based on the late science fiction writer Arthur C. Clarke.

=== Pega ===
Alien Pegassa "Pega" (ぺガッサ星人 ぺガ, Pegassa Seijin Pega) is a child of the Alien Pegassa race that debuted in episode 6 of Ultraseven. Six years prior to the series, Pega was ordered by his parents to wander across the universe and return to their home planet once he grow. One day, his transportation capsule broke and was left stranded on Earth until a young Riku offered a shelter to him, thus marking the start of his friendship. Despite his cowardly appearance, Pega always wishes to help Geed in any way he can and sells handmade paper flowers to keep Riku afloat.

When wandering outside, Pega uses his kind's Dark Zone (ダーク・ゾーン, Dāku Zōn) ability to hide within Riku's shadow. He is also a talented genius and is proficient in Spanish.

Pega is voiced by Megumi Han (潘 めぐみ, Han Megumi), previously voicing young Shinjiro Hayata, Seiji Hokuto and Yuko Minami in ULTRAMAN and Eleking in Kaiju Girls. He is named after Alien Pega from episode 36 of Ultraseven.

=== Laiha Toba ===
Laiha Toba (鳥羽 ライハ, Toba Raiha) (Note: Her given name is written in kanji as "來葉".) is a 19-year-old girl with a mastery of swordsmanship who has never missed a single day of training, revealed to originally hosted a Little Star since birth when Ultraman King answered her parents' prayers to be born without complications. While the Little Star manifested when Laiha was 13 years old, it became dormant in the aftermath of her parents' death on Mt. Mitsuse by Kei Fukuide as Skull Gomora. Laiha vowed to find her parents' murderer and avenge them. In the present day, she met Riku while rescuing Eri from a Dada, witnessing his transformation into Geed and given board in the Nebula House in return for her intel about the Little Stars. Sometime prior to the arrival of Ultraman Belial, Laiha's Little Star powers resurface, allowing her to hear King's voice when he pleaded her not to kill Kei and later warning her of Belial's arrival. Upon learning of her powers, and her feelings for Riku, Laiha saved him while transferring her Little Star into Riku in the form of King Capsule.

Laiha Toba is portrayed by Chihiro Yamamoto (山本 千尋, Yamamoto Chihiro).

=== RE.M. ===
RE.M. (レム, Remu; short for "REport Management") is the Nebula House's Report Management System (報告管理システム, Hōkoku Kanri Shisutemu), revealed to be an operation system created by Kei and named after the Sturm word for "servitude." By the time RE.M. was found by Riku, her memory of Kei deleted, she designated the youth the new owner as he coincidentally named her after a heroine from Donshine. While RE.M provides Riku with his arsenal, she reveals that much of her access like sensitive data like that on the Little Stars is blocked. Overtime, RE.M. gradually becomes more human-like prior to Kei forcefully taking back the Nebula House and deleting her when she sent Riku to safety. Though RE.M. survives by transferring herself to an android body, Kei capitalizes by restoring her original programing to force her to fight Geed when piloting Mecha Gomora. But RE.M. manages to purge herself of her base programming, retaking the Nebula House from Kei while gaining full access to all the data he previously locked.

RE.M. primarily interacts with others through spherical devices called U-Toms (ユートム, Yūtomu), which can track and fire laser beams.

RE.M. is voiced by Suzuko Mimori (三森 すずこ, Mimori Suzuko), who also portrayed her android body. The U-Toms are a tribute to the similarly named robot from episode 17 of Ultraseven.

== AIB ==
The Alien Investigation Bureau, abbreviated as AIB, is a secret investigation team that deals with evil aliens. The foundation of this group is a result of the Crisis Impact, formed by aliens of multiple races in hopes of restoring the order Belial destroyed. The appearance of Ultraman Geed had caused mixed receptions among their members, with several few believed him as a threat. To disguise their modus operandi, they pose as salespersons of Nico Nico Life Insurance (ニコニコ生命保険, Niko Niko Seimei Hoken). In aftermath of Belial's death, the AIB begin a secondary mission to gather the scattered Monster Capsules and prevent them from falling into wrong hands.

=== Moa Aizaki ===
Moa Aizaki (愛崎 モア, Aizaki Moa) (Note: Her given name is written in kanji as "萌亜".) is Riku's childhood friend, also liked watching Donshine as a child. Aged 25 years old in the series, her family was the one who found Riku at the observatory and took care of him ever since then before he is able to live on his own. Her membership in AIB begins when she was tendering an exhausted alien of the Zelan race, causing Zenna to take interest from her bravery and took Moa under his wing as his partner. Though she tends to mess up, Zenna considers Moa a vital member in the AIB.

Moa Aizaki is portrayed by Mayu Hasegawa (長谷川 眞優, Hasegawa Mayu). As a child, Moa is portrayed by Usa Makino (牧野 羽咲, Makino Usa).

=== Zenna ===
Zenna (ゼナ, Zena) is Moa's senior agent and a member of the warlike alien race known as the Alien Shadow (シャドー星人, Shadō Seijin), his kind having first appeared in episode 23 of Ultraseven. Zenna was originally an instructor to young Shadow operatives, called Gabra Cano (ガブラ・カーノ, Gabura Kāno) or Children of War (戦いの子, Tatakai no Ko). (Note: The term Gabra Cano is a reference to Deadly Poisonous Monster Gabura (猛毒怪獣 ガブラ, Mōdoku Kaijū Gabura) from episode 23 of Ultraseven.) After Belial's actions destroyed Planet Shadow, Zenna joined the AIB under the pretense to rebuild his planet's former glory before deciding to coexist with other species while working on Earth under the human identity of Hideki Sena (瀬名 日出樹, Sena Hideki). As his people are unable to emote, Zenna's mouth does not move while in disguise. Although he hid Zegun in hopes of using the monster to counter Belial if he returns, preferring to destroy the control device and leave the monster stranded in another dimension, the infiltration by his student Kuruto made use of Zegun impossible. With his student beyond reasoning, Zenna was forced to beg Geed and Zero to end Kuruto's life.

Zenna is portrayed by suit actor Hideyoshi Iwata (岩田 栄慶, Iwata Hideyoshi) in his human form and voiced by Shintarō Asanuma (浅沼 晋太郎, Asanuma Shintarō).

==== Zegun ====
Dimensional Demolition Lord Zegun (時空破壊神 ゼガン, Jikū Hakai-shin Zegan; 14, 15, 25): A monster created as the Shadow race's living weapon, its Zegant Beam (ゼガントビーム, Zeganto Bīmu) capable of sending its targets to different places. Although not fatal to the monster, using Zegun when its controller in an exhausted state would cost them their own life. When Zenna joined the AIB, he kept Zegun's bracelet, initially wanting to dispose before keeping it in case of Belial's return. After Kuruto infiltrate the group and stole it, he decided to use Zegun to invade Earth and restore the glory of Planet Shadow. In its second fight with Geed and Zero, Kuruto had Zegun destroy itself after it was sealed in a containment barrier made by the two Ultras. Zenna later restored Zegun to aid Geed in the final battle against Belial. While Zegun helped Geed create a portal to the void to trap Belial, the monster is destroyed by the evil Ultraman.

=== Other members ===
- Transforming Phantom Alien Pitt "Tree-Tip" (変身怪人 ピット星人 トリィ＝ティプ, Henshin Kaijin Pitto Seijin Toryi Tipu; 4, 16): An alien scientist of the all-female Pitt race who hosted the Little Star of Ultraman Hikari, granting her the ability to create an energy sword. Tri was originally part of a Pitt invasion force but defected and by hiding an Eleking they were to use on Earth before making a new life on the planet. When the Little Star in her body awakened Eleking, Tri desperately used herself as bait to lure the monster out from the city, breaking the speed limit and steals Riku's bike along the way while attracting the AIB's attention. Tri manages to convince the AIB that she is not like her kin, later being recruited by the organization and working on Earth under the human identity of Tomiko Torii (鳥居 富子, Torii Tomiko) after her Little Star was harvested by Geed. While stationed to investigate and protect Little Star hosts, she was attacked by Godo Wynn, who attempted to kidnap the hosts before Laiha's intervention. She is portrayed by Rina Sakuragi (桜木 梨奈, Sakuragi Rina) and her race first appeared in episode 3 of Ultraseven.
- Alien Zobetai "Nabia" (ゾべタイ星人 ナビア, Zobetai Seijin Nabia; 10): A teenage humanoid alien whose race possesses the power to read the minds of others, skills used by the AIB to deal with monsters to find out their intent. While on Earth to help with a Zandrias, assuming the alias Satoko (サトコ), Nabia expresses initial disappointment in humans being dishonest (something that her race lacked due to being mind readers) before eventually understanding it a bit after achieving her mission with the Ultra Warriors' and Moa's help. She is portrayed by Rei Ishigami (石神 澪, Ishigami Rei).
- Artifice Alien Alien Pedan (策略宇宙人 ペダン星人, Sakuryaku Uchūjin Pedan Seijin; 11): One of the aliens in command center who spies on Kei Fukuide. First appeared in episode 13 of Ultraseven.
- Possession Alien Alien Serpent (憑依宇宙人 サーペント星人, Hyōi Uchūjin Sāpento Seijin; 11, 22): One of the aliens in command center who spies on Kei Fukuide. First appeared in episode 39 of Ultraman Mebius.
- Alien Groza (グローザ星系人, Gurōza Seikeijin; 11, 22): One of the aliens in command center who spies on Kei Fukuide. He is a tribute to Grozam from episodes 43-46 of Ultraman Mebius.
- Space Phantom Alien Zelan (宇宙怪人 ゼラン星人, Uchū Kaijin Zeran Seijin; 11): One of the aliens who spies on Kei before succumbing to his surprise attack. First appeared in episode 31 of Return of Ultraman.
- Alien Doble (ドーブル星人, Dōburu Seijin; 11): One of the aliens who spies on Kei before succumbing to his surprise attack.
- Friendly Alien Alien Neril (友好異星人 ネリル星人, Yūkō Iseijin Neriru Seijin; 11, 22): A female alien who was among the operatives that spied Kei. During his surprise attack, she try to get his editor to safety before being attacked by his cane. First appeared in episode 25 of Ultraman Max.
- Space Phantom Cicada Woman (宇宙怪人 セミ女, Uchū Kaijin Semi Onna; 16): A female alien who operates the command center with Zenna. She is voiced by Miki Ōtani (大谷 美紀, Ōtani Miki) and first appeared in episode 16 of Ultra Q: Dark Fantasy.
- Alien Pegassa "Bega" (ベガ): An adult Alien Pegassa who appeared in the second and third episode of Ultraman Chronicle Zero & Geed. He is an AIB agent sent to monitor Riku and Pega in the Beyond School and was mistaken as the latter by the young Ultra in disguise. Although prefers conversing in the Pegassa's native language, he understands Japanese words. He was originally mentioned in episode 24 of Ultraman New Generation Chronicle when Booska mistook an AIB enrollment letter meant for Pega. He is voiced by Megumi Han, who is also Pega's voice actress.

== Igaguri Family ==
=== Rumina Igaguri ===
Rumina Igaguri (伊賀栗 ルミナ, Igaguri Rumina) is Leito's 28-year-old wife. She later knows her hushand's identity as Ultraman Zero on episode 24 due to his bad at lying whenever he has something else to do.

Rumina Igaguri is portrayed by Hitomi Hasebe (長谷部 瞳, Hasabe Hitomi), previously portraying Mizuki Koishikawa in Ultraman Max.

=== Mayu Igaguri ===
Mayu Igaguri (伊賀栗 マユ, Igaguri Mayu) is Leito's 5-year-old daughter who is later revealed to be the host of Zero's Little Star, enabling her to teleport. Her power was transferred to Geed in the form of Zero Capsule when pleading him to save Laiha.

Mayu Igaguri is portrayed by Mirei Shimizu (清水 美怜, Shimizu Mirei).

== Other Ultra Warriors ==
As a result of Belial and Kei's actions in the Childhood Radiation, the powers of Ultra Warriors were scattered around the Earth and inhabited their hosts as Little Stars.

=== Ultraman King ===
Ultraman King (ウルトラマンキング, Urutoraman Kingu; 3, 16, 17, 25) is a legendary figure in the Land of Light who previously debuted in episode 26 of Ultraman Leo.

King appears in the midst of Crisis Impact, restoring the universe after Belial destroyed it by merging his entire being into it. As a result, King's essence is too scattered for him to be reached by the others. Laiha was his Little Star host, who develop this symptom when he saved her during her birth and as a result developing Little Star symptoms earlier before Kei instigated the Childhood Radiation. Aside from guiding Laiha, King as well provide her his help to reach Riku and save him from Chimeraberus. His power becomes the King Capsule (キングカプセル, Kingu Kapuseru) and provide Geed the means to become Royal Megamaster. After claiming the Sturm Organ from Kei, Belial absorbed King's essence to further strengthen himself and simultaneously endangering both the universe and King's own life until Zero delivers a specialized enzyme to Belial's timer, therefore reversing the process. King aids Geed in the final battle by materializing his other forms. Using the King Capsule again, Riku restored King's original body as he thanked the boy and departed from Earth.

Ultraman King is voiced by Nobuyuki Hiyama, who also voices the Risers.

=== Inter-Galactic Defense Force ===
The Inter-Galactic Defense Force (宇宙警備隊, Uchū Keibitai) is an organization in the Land of Light. Several members were shown fighting against Belial before he commences Crisis Impact (クライシス・インパクト, Kuraishisu Inpakuto). Six years after that, the Ultra Warriors were regarded as a myth to the humanity with memories of Crisis Impact were assumed to be meteorite showers.

- Father of Ultra (ウルトラの父, Urutora no Chichi; 24, 25, Movie): The Executive Leader of Inter-Galactic Defense Force, originally known as Ultraman Ken and a former comrade of Belial prior to his descent into evil. A fragment of his power inhabited the body of Sui Asakura which is harvested as Father of Ultra Capsule (ウルトラの父カプセル, Urutora no Chichi Kapuseru) from Asakura's will for Riku to live on. Father later appears to aid Geed and the others against Belial in the final battle by preserving the latter in a containment barrier long enough for Geed to escape before the former recuperated and rejoined the battle. He is voiced by Tokuma Nishioka (西岡 徳馬, Nishioka Tokuma).
- Mother of Ultra (ウルトラの母, Urutora no Haha; 24, Movie): The Silver Cross Aid Commander, originally known as Ultrawoman Marie. She is voiced by Masako Ikeda (池田 昌子, Ikeda Masako).
- Ultra Brothers (ウルトラ兄弟, Urutora Kyōdai): A division of 11 Ultras. Alongside untold numbers of Inter-Galactic Defense Force members, they fought against Ultraman Belial and were caught in the Crisis Impact explosion. The six core members had a single Ultra Capsule in the form of Ultra 6 Brothers Capsule (ウルトラ6兄弟カプセル, Urutora Roku Kyōdai Kapuseru).
  - Ultraman (ウルトラマン, Urutoraman; 1, 25, Movie): See here.
  - Zoffy (ゾフィー, Zofī; 1, Movie): His power inhabited a Gubila, allowing the monster to emit paralyzing sparks from its Die Hard Drill. It was harvested by Geed into Zoffy Capsule (ゾフィーカプセル, Zofī Kapuseru) out of Gubila's gratitude towards the Ultra. He is voiced by Hideyuki Tanaka (田中 秀幸, Tanaka Hideyuki).
  - Ultraseven (ウルトラセブン, Urutorasebun; 1, 25, Movie): Zero's father and a fellow participant in the fight against Belial prior to Crisis Impact. The resulting machination by Crisis Impact forced him to refrain an injured Zero from advancing further until Ultraman King arrived to reverse the destruction. His power inhabited Toru Honda and was harvested by Geed into the Seven Capsule (セブンカプセル, Sebun Kapuseru). His voice role is reprised by Kohji Moritsugu (森次晃嗣, Moritsugu Kōji).
  - Ultraman Jack (ウルトラマンジャック, Urutoraman Jakku; 1): See here.
  - Ultraman Ace (ウルトラマンエース, Urutoraman Ēsu; 1): His power inhabited Fujio Manga, allowing him to use the Ultra's Vertical Guillotine. Alongside Jack and Taro, the Ace Capsule (エースカプセル, Ēsu Kapuseru) was harvested by Geed upon his host's gratitude for the Ultra.
  - Ultraman Taro (ウルトラマンタロウ, Urutoraman Tarō; 1, Movie): See here
  - Ultraman Leo (ウルトラマンレオ, Urutoraman Reo; 1, Finale): An Ultraman from Nebula L77 in the Leo constellation. Following the Crisis Impact, Leo's power became a Little Star that inhabited Eri Hara before it transferred into Geed. This event allowed the creation of Leo Capsule (レオカプセル, Reo Kapuseru) in Riku's arsenal.
  - Astra (アストラ, Asutora; 1): Leo's brother.
  - Ultraman 80 (ウルトラマン80, Urutoraman Eiti; 1)
  - Ultraman Mebius (ウルトラマンメビウス, Urutoraman Mebiusu; 1): See here.
  - Ultraman Hikari (ウルトラマンヒカリ, Urutoraman Hikari; 1, 8, 25): A scientist who was previously a member of the Space Science Technology Bureau. Prior to the Crisis Impact, Hikari created the Risers and Ultra Capsules for the fight against Ultraman Belial before they were stolen sometime after the universe was restored. Following the Crisis Impact, Hikari's power became a Little Star that inhabited Tree-Tip before it transferred into Geed and created Hikari Capsule (ヒカリカプセル, Hikari Kapuseru). When Zero was fighting a Galactron, Hikari sent him a Riser and a set of New Generation Capsules. He is voiced by Keiichi Nanba (難波 圭一, Nanba Keiichi).

=== Heisei Ultras ===
- Ultraman Cosmos (ウルトラマンコスモス, Urutoraman Kosumosu; Finale): Though never appeared, his Little Star hosted within Moko and was salvaged by Geed while fighting against Arstron, allowing him to obtain Cosmos Capsule (コスモスカプセル, Kosumosu Kapuseru) as part of his new form Acro Smasher.
- New Generation Heroes (ニュージェネレーションヒーローズ, Nyū Jenerēshon Hīrōzu): In the height of Galactron's attack, Hikari presented Leito/Zero with the third Riser and Capsules of succeeding Ultra Warriors. This allows the Ultra to assume Ultraman Zero Beyond and turn the tides of the battle.
  - New Generation Capsule Alpha (ニュージェネレーションカプセルα, Nyū Jenerēshon Kapuseru Arufa)
    - Ultraman Ginga (ウルトラマンギンガ, Urutoraman Ginga): His power inhabited the Ginga Capsule (ギンガカプセル, Ginga Kapuseru).
    - Gai Kurenai/Ultraman Orb (クレナイ・ガイ/ウルトラマンオーブ, Kurenai Gai/Urutoraman Ōbu; Movie): His power inhabited the Ultraman Orb: Orb Origin Capsule (ウルトラマンオーブ オーブオリジンカプセル, Urutoraman Ōbu Ōbu Orijin Kapuseru). In the event of Gillvalis' assault on Earth, Gai approached Riku and providing advice to the young boy as an Ultra Warrior. He is reprised by Hideo Ishiguro (石黒 英雄, Ishiguro Hideo).
  - New Generation Capsule Beta (ニュージェネレーションカプセルβ, Nyū Jenerēshon Kapuseru Bēta)
    - Ultraman Victory (ウルトラマンビクトリー, Urutoraman Bikutorī): His power inhabited the Victory Capsule (ビクトリーカプセル, Bikutorī Kapuseru).
    - Ultraman X (ウルトラマンエックス, Urutoraman Ekkusu): His power inhabited the X Capsule (エックスカプセル, Ekkusu Kapuseru).

== Supporting heroes ==
- Ultimate Force Zero (ウルティメイトフォースゼロ, Urutimeito Fōsu Zero; 7, Movie): The team of giant heroes founded by Ultraman Zero in aftermath of the destruction of Belial Galactic Empire. Alongside Zero, their characters were portrayed as villains in Kei's Cosmo Chronicle.

== Antagonists ==
=== Ultraman Belial ===
Ultraman Belial (ウルトラマンベリアル, Urutoraman Beriaru) is a recurring evil Ultra Warrior in the Ultraman series and the major antagonist of Ultraman Geed. Having recuperated his strength from his defeat in Ultra Zero Fight and killing Reibatos to reclaim the Giga Battle Nizer, Belial led his army into another war against the Ultras, centering at the World of Side Space wherein he concluded the fight by detonating the Super Dimensional Eradication Bomb (超時空消滅爆弾, Chō Jikū Shōmetsu Bakudan) and triggering the Crisis Impact (クライシス・インパクト, Kuraishisu Inpakuto). But through Ultraman King's intervention, the universe was restored with Belial reduced to an incorporeal state as he takes refuge in a dimensional tear while entrusting Kei Fukuide to steal the Ultra Capsules and Risers orchestrate his restoration. To that end, Kei created the Nebula House and used a sample of Belial Factor (ベリアル因子, Beriaru Inshi) to create Riku Asakura as the Sturm's pawn.

19 years later, their plan were put into motion as they orchestrate Riku's transformation into Ultraman Geed (destroying his house and leaving behind a set of Ultra Capsules (among them being the Belial Capsule (ベリアルカプセル, Beriaru Kapuseru) - his own power) and a Riser) and had him collect the Ultra Capsules in hopes of restoring Belial's corporeal form. Although Zero managed to seal the entrance to Belial's dimension, he easily escaped sometime later as he raced towards Earth and absorbed Geed as Chimeraberus. Belial's attempt to completely absorb his son while winning him over with illusions failed due to Zero, Laiha and King's intervention, allowing Geed to escape, obtain King's Ultra Capsule and destroy Chimeraberus with his new Royal Mega Master form. Despite his apparent death, Belial lived on, having chosen a young woman named Arie Ishikari as his host to keep tabs on Kei until his Sturm Organ was ready for him to take as his own. Abandoning his host and Kei, having incorporated the Sturm Organ into his body to siphon King's essence to use a power source, Belial assumes Atrocious to overwhelm his opposition before Geed manages to drag his father into a dimensional void and, making a final attempt to reason with his father after seeing his memories. Unfortunately as Belial was too focused on his grudges, Geed was forced to kill in a beam struggle. His death sealed his fate to remain spiritually trapped in the dimensional void whereas Geed escaped not long after.

Having restored to his former strength, Belial retains his use of Giga Battle Nizer and Deathcium Beam. As he is also in possession of a Riser and Monster Capsules, he can additional forms to augment his strength:

- Chimeraberus (キメラべロス, Kimeraberosu): (Note: Although it was spelled Chimeraberus in the card release of Ultraman Fusion Fight! Capsule Yugo, the Crunchyroll translation stated that it was Chimeraberos.) A Fusion Rise of Ultraman Belial, which accessed through the use of Five King and Zog (Second Form)'s Monster Capsules. Aside from gaining a pair of wings, Belial can exert a portion of Gan-Q's power to absorb his son, Ultraman Geed. His finishers are Berus Inferno (ベロスインフェルノ, Berosu Inferuno) and Deathcium Burst (デスシウムバースト, Desushiumu Bāsuto).
- Ultraman Belial Atrocious (ウルトラマンベリアル アトロシアス, Urutoraman Beriaru Atoroshiasu): Belial's Demonic Fusion (デモニックフュージョン, Demonikku Fyūjon) form, using the Dark Lugiel and Alien Empera Monster Capsules in conjunction with the Sturm Organ he assimilated into his body. He uses the Sturm Organ to spread out the Carellen Element to draw Ultraman King's scattered essence and convert it into energy to increase his power. Aside from retaining the use of the Giga Battle Nizer, he is also capable of utilizing Atros Hell Claws (アトロスヘルクロー, Atorosu Heru Kurō) and his finisher is Atros Burst (アトロスバースト, Atorosu Bāsuto).

Yūki Ono (小野 友樹, Ono Yūki) reprises his voice role as Ultraman Belial from Ultra Zero Fight.

==== Arie Ishikari ====
Arie Ishikari (石刈 アリエ, Ishikari Arie) (Note: Her first name in Kanji is written as "亜璃依". Additionally, the romanization of her family name is left ambiguous, as it was either "Isikari" (flyer) or "Ishikari" (business card).) is a 28 year old aspiring nonfiction writer who approaches things from a non-biased point of view. She had been researching Kei's background ever since his rise to popularity as a famous writer.

She provided Kei refuge in exchange of her writing the man's biography, remained adamant of that even after witnessing Kei fighting the Ultramen and his attempt to kill her in his weakened state, becoming his willing accomplice as a result. Despite Arie's undying loyalty and love towards him, she was quickly killed by Kei once she served his purpose in retrieving the Alien Empera and Dark Lugiel Capsules. After Kei's final battle with Geed, Arie revealed that she had survived her attempted assassination, and also that she was Belial's host, having assumed this role after the Dark Ultra was defeated as Chimeraberus. Tearing out the Sturm Organ from Kei's body, Belial used it to revive himself before abandoning Arie's body. Once Belial was free of Arie, the young author collapsed and her fate was left unknown.

Arie Ishikari is portrayed by Ryoko Kobayashi (小林 涼子, Kobayashi Ryōko).

=== Kei Fukuide ===
Kei Fukuide (伏井出 ケイ, Fukuide Kei) is the supporting antagonist of the series, an alien of the war-torn race known as the Alien Sturm (ストルム星人, Sutorumu Sejin) who found purpose when recruited by Ultraman Belial during the end days of Planet Sturm. Having become fanatically devoted to Belial, Kei acted his master's wishes by creating Riku and using Riser technology he stole from Planet Ultra to develop the Monster Capsules. On Earth following the Crisis Impact, Kei sets himself up in the public as a famous sci-fi writer, his novels Cosmo Chronicle (コズモクロニクル, Kozumo Kuronikuru), Galactic Battleship El-Shade (銀河戦艦エルシェード, Ginga Senkan Erushēdo), and The Ambient Starry Sky (星空のアンビエント, Hoshizora no Anbiento) being inverse versions of Belial's encounters with Zero. When the AIB caught on to his true nature, vexed in Geed not making it easy, Kei is forced to steal the Ultra Capsules in Riku's possession. But Kei loses the Zero Capsule, forced by Belial to absorb the other six Ultra Capsules' energy which causes him to briefly lose his mind in a berserker rampage before being defeated by Geed Magnificent. After Belial's death, bent on making Riku suffer for his actions while using the Nebula House's resources to heal his Sturm Organ, Kei resolved to inherit the former's legacy and used nonfiction writer Arie Ishikari to acquire the Alien Empera and Dark Lugiel Capsules for his ideal final chapter. But following his final battle with Geed in Okinawa, learning that Belial survived and observed him through Arie, Kei loses his Sturm Organ and forsaken despite his expression of being an integral part in his master's plan and resolves to continue aiding Belial until he drew his last breath during the final battle.

While posing as a polite gentleman, Kei unveils a cruel and ruthless side when engaging in a battle. As a Sturm, Kei possesses his race's Sturm Organ (ストルム器官, Sutorumu Kikan), which polarizes energies absorbed into his body, allowing him to create negation barriers and fire shockwave projectiles from his hand. Because of said organ, Kei had been storing energies from his battle with Geed and Zero under the purpose to strengthen himself but lost it when Belial tear the organ from his body to revive himself, leaving Kei with several days to live. Through the Fusion Rise, with Belial's power coursing through him, he can Fusion Rise into hybrid monsters known as Belial Fusion Monster (ベリアル融合獣, Beriaru Yūgō-jū), that also have Belial's Color Timer (カラータイマー, Karā Taimā) on their chest via a Riser and a pair of Monster Capsules. By loading a single Monster Capsule to the Riser, he can summon a single monster based on it. The Belial Fusion Monster will forcefully disappear should their Monster Capsules overheated, forcing Kei to use another set or wait for the original to cool down.

- Skull Gomora (スカルゴモラ, Sukaru Gomora; 1, 2, 9): Accessed with the use of Gomora and Red King Capsules, its finisher being the Skull Oscillatory Wave (スカル振動波, Sukaru Shindō-ha). This monster first appeared targeting a young Laiha by killing her parents in Mt. Mitsuse and harvest her Little Star. Six years later, it rampaged on Hoshiyama, targeting Eri's Little Star before being subjected to Geed's Wrecking Burst, allowing Riku to claim Leo Capsule based on Kei's anticipation.
- Thunder Killer (サンダーキラー, Sandā Kirā; 5, 6, 18): Accessed with the use of Eleking and Ace-Killer Capsules, its finisher being Thunder Discharge (サンダーデスチャージ, Sandā Desuchāji). In its initial appearance, Kei used Thunder Killer as an attempt to strengthen Geed, allowing the latter to obtain Geed Claw. He used it again and fought alongside a summoned Zaigorg until he was defeated by Geed Royal Megamaster.
- Pedanium Zetton (ペダニウムゼットン, Pedaniumu Zetton; 11, 12, 21): Accessed with the use of Zetton and King Joe Capsules, its finisher being Pedanium Meteor (ペダニウム・メテオ, Pedaniumu Meteo). It was first used to fight against Ultraman Geed to claim all his Capsules after putting their battle into a stalemate. When Belial forced him to absorb its power, Kei plunged it to his chest and rampaged across the city as Pedanium Zetton under the state of insanity before being defeated by Geed. Sometime later, Pedanium Zetton was utilized to hunt Gubila (a Little Star host) across the city and used his knowledge of Geed's Royal Megamaster to overpower said Ultra before Gubila paralyzed him long enough for Geed to counterattack.
  - Pedanium Zetton Evolved (ペダニウムゼットン・エボルド, Pedaniumu Zetton Eborudo; 23): Having empowering his Sturm Organ with the light of Planet Sturm, Kei transforms into a variation of Pedanium Zetton, signified by the greenish energy emission from his Sturm Organ. This was further enhanced when he shoved the Monster Capsules of Alien Empera and Dark Lugiel, growing into a towering monster before Geed defeated him for good. While growing gigantic, Pedanium Zetton Evolved can charge his fist with Sturm energy to perform Pedanium Volcanon (ペダニウム・ボルカノン, Pedaniumu Borukanon).
- King Galactron (キングギャラクトロン, Kingu Gyarakutoron; 22): Accessed with the use of King Joe and Galactron Capsules, its finisher being the Pedanium Hard Launcher (ペダニウムハードランチャー, Pedaniumu Hādo Ranchā). Although an original character in Ultraman Fusion Fight! Capsule Yugo, this fusion made its appearance in the Ultraman Festival 2017 and assumed by Ultraman Belial. King Galactron's appearance in the series was used by Kei Fukuide in against Geed and Zero while Arie tried to claim the capsules of Alien Empera and Dark Lugiel.

In addition, the Data Carddass game Ultraman Fusion Fight! also introduced game-exclusive Fusion Rise. By inserting two Monster Capsules into the arcade machine, players can utilize the Fusion exclusively in a finisher.

- Maga Maga-Arch Belial (禍々アークベリアル, Maga Maga Āku Beriaru): Accessed with the use of Arch Belial and Maga-Orochi Capsules, its finisher being the Maga Maga-Arch Deathcium (マガマガアークデスシウム, Maga Maga Āku Desushiumu).
- Strong Gomorant (ストロング・ゴモラント, Sutorongu Gomoranto): Accessed with the use of Gomora and Tyrant Capsules, its finisher being the Gravitro Pressure (グラビトロプレッシャー, Gurabitoro Puresshā).
- Bemzeed (ベムゼード, Bemuzēdo): Accessed with the use of Zetton and Bemstar Capsules, its finisher being the Trillion Inferno (トリリオンインフェルノ, Toririon Inferuno).
- Burning Bemstra (バーニング・ベムストラ, Bāningu Bemusutora): Accessed with the use of Bemular and Arstron Capsules, its finisher being the Pale Cyclone (ペイルサイクロン, Peiru Saikuron).

Kei Fukuide is portrayed by Kunito Watanabe (渡辺 邦斗, Watanabe Kunito). Meanwhile, his Riser is voiced by Kenta Matsumoto (松本 健太, Matsumoto Kenta), who was also the one that came up with the names and finishers of Belial Fusion Monsters.

=== Monster Capsules ===
Monster Capsules (怪獣カプセル, Kaijū Kapuseru) are items created by Kei through infusing Hikari's Ultra Capsules and the essence of Ultra Monsters. These capsules allow them to utilize its power as a Belial Fusion Monsters or summon respective monsters into the battle. Even when not in use, a single capsule can still harm the surrounding environment with its presence. Belial's collection of capsules scattered across the city upon Chimeraberus' destruction, forcing AIB to collect them as possible before they could be used by other evil factions.

Summoned Capsules

- Darklops Zero (ダークロプスゼロ, Dākuropusu Zero; 3): A robotic doppelgänger of Ultraman Zero that first appeared Ultra Galaxy Legend Side Story: Ultraman Zero vs. Darklops Zero as a drone in the Belial Galactic Empire, armed with a pair of Darklops Zero Sluggers (ダークロプスゼロスラッガー, Dākuropsu Zero Suraggā). One single model was first shown fighting against Geed before it escaped from Zero's intervention. Three Darklops Zero were summoned by Kei through the use of three Darklops Zero Capsules (ダークロプスゼロカプセル, Dākuropusu Zero Kapuseru) before they were destroyed by Geed Solid Burning.
- Civil Judgementer Galactron (シビルジャッジメンター ギャラクトロン, Shibiru Jajjimentā Gyarakutoron; 7, 8, Movie): A giant war robot of unknown origin that first appeared in episode 14 of Ultraman Orb, having attack numerous dimension. Kei possesses two Galactron Capsules (ギャラクトロンカプセル, Gyarakutoron Kapuseru), using one in his plan to hold his audience hostage to force Zero to take the blow from its heat ray, successfully killing him before shutting down to give Geed a reprieve. It reactivated in the next day under Kei's orders to resume it fight with Geed as he summoned a second Galactron to fight against a revived Zero before both units were destroyed by Geed Acro Smasher and Zero Beyond. Galactron's main weapons are Galactron Shaft (ギャラクトロンシャフト, Gyarakutoron Shafuto) capture claw and Galactron Blade (ギャラクトロンブレード, Gyarakutoron Burēdo) sword. Its strongest attack is Galactron Spark (ギャラクトロンスパーク, Gyarakutoron Supāku).
- Inferno Demon Monster Zaigorg (閻魔獣 ザイゴーグ, Enma-jū Zaigōgu; 18): A monster summoned by Kei through the use of Zaigorg Capsule (ザイゴーグカプセル, Zaigōgu Kapuseru) and first appeared in Ultraman X The Movie. Its main weapon is a huge kanabō on its right arm and launches Hell's Relieve (ヘルズレリーブ, Heruzu Rerību) from its chest. Kei used it to fend himself against the Dada-piloted Legionoid before joining Thunder Killer in against Ultraman Geed, defeated by Royal Megamaster's Lance Spark.
- Robot Monster Mecha Gomora (ロボット怪獣 メカゴモラ, Robotto Kaijū Meka Gomora; 19): Summoned by Kei via the Mecha Gomora Capsule (メカゴモラカプセル, Meka Gomora Kapuseru), a brainwashed RE.M. was forced to pilot the robot, using both her analysis of Geed and Mecha Gomora's strength in against the Ultra before she managed to regain her senses. After exiting Mecha Gomora and banishing Kei out from the Nebula House, RE.M. exposed the robot's main weakness on its neck, allowing Geed Royal Megamaster to destroy it via Spacium Flasher. First appeared in Ultra Galaxy Legend Side Story: Ultraman Zero vs. Darklops Zero.
- Regenerating Monster Star Bem Gyeron (再生怪獣 ギエロン星獣, Saisei Kaijū Gieron Seijū; 20): A monster with the ability to regenerate, Star Bem Gyeron was a monster who first appeared in episode 26 of Ultraseven. Kei summoned it from the Star Bem Gyeron Capsule (ギエロン星獣カプセル, Gieron Seijū Kapuseru) to have it amass data on Geed's Royal Megamaster form, its regenerative powers allowing the monster to revive itself every day at 10:00 am. By the sixth day of its appearance, once the group formulating a plan to negate its regeneration, Geed destroys Star Bem Gyeron while Zero creates a barrier to lessen the distance of the remains. The remains are then gathered and frozen by the Hoshiyama residents as AIB scattered the frozen fragments across the universe.

Other Capsules

- Gomora Capsule (ゴモラカプセル, Gomora Kapuseru): Contains the essence of Ancient Monster Gomora (古代怪獣 ゴモラ, Kodai Kaijū Gomora) from episodes 26 and 27 of Ultraman. It was used alongside Red King Capsule to form Skull Gomora.
- Red King Capsule (レッドキングカプセル, Reddo Kingu Kapuseru): Based on Skull Monster Red King (どくろ怪獣 レッドキング, Dokuro Kaijū Reddo Kingu) from episode 8 of Ultraman. It was used in unison with Gomora Capsule to form Skull Gomora.
- Ace-Killer Capsule (エースキラーカプセル, Ēsu Kirā Kapuseru): Contains the essence of Extradimensional Terrible-Being Ace-Killer (異次元超人 エースキラー, Ijigen Chōjin Ēsu Kirā) from episode 14 of Ultraman Ace. It was used in unison with Eleking Capsule to form Thunder Killer
- King Joe Capsule (キングジョーカプセル, Kingu Jō Kapuseru): Contains the essence of Space Robot King Joe (宇宙ロボット キングジョー, Uchū Robotto Kingu Jō) from episodes 14 and 15 of Ultraseven. It was used in unison with Zetton Capsule to form Pedanium Zetton or Galactron Capsule to form King Galactron.
- Zetton Capsule (ゼットンカプセル, Zetton Kapuseru): Contains the essence of Space Dinosaur Zetton (宇宙恐竜 ゼットン, Uchū Kyōryū Zetton) from episode 39 of Ultraman. It was used in unison with King Joe Capsule to form Pedanium Zetton.
- Alien Empera Capsule (エンペラ星人カプセル, Enpera Seijin Kapuseru): Contains the essence of Dark Space Great Emperor Alien Empera (暗黒宇宙大皇帝 エンペラ星人, Ankoku Uchū Dai Kōtei Enpera Seijin), the ruler of the Empera Army who first appeared in the final four episodes of Ultraman Mebius. It was retrieved by the AIB in the aftermath of Belial's demise and secured in their vault until Kei took it for his endgame. Kei used both of them to enlarge Pedanium Zetton before Belial did the same as Atrocious.
- Dark Lugiel Capsule (ダークルギエルカプセル, Dāku Rugieru Kapuseru): Contains the essence of Darkness Demon Dark Lugiel (暗黒の魔神 ダークルギエル, Ankoku no Majin Dāku Rugieru), Ultraman Ginga's dark counterpart. The Dark Lugiel Capsule was retrieved by AIB in the aftermath of Belial's demise, stored away in their vault for safe keeping until Kei took it for his endgame. Kei briefly used them to enlarge Pedanium Zetton before Belial did the same as Atrocious.

=== Gillvalis ===
Giant Artificial Brain Gillvalis (巨大人工頭脳 ギルバリス, Kyodai Jinkō Zunō Girubarisu) is the main antagonist of Ultraman Geed The Movie, originally a sentient artificial intelligence called Terahakis (テラハーキス, Terahākisu) (Note: Terahakis means "bring peace to us" in the Kushia language.) created by Kushia scientists for universal peace. But Gillvalis' programing causes him to reach the conclusion that all other forms of intelligent life in the universe must be exterminated. Gillvalis mass-produced a legion of Galactrons called the Galactron Army (ギャラクトロン軍団, Gyarakutoron Gundan) and sends them to Earth to acquire the Giga Finalizer on Okinawa.

Aside from the ability to reflect all attacks from Ultra Warriors, Gillvalis is also capable of digitizing an entire planet. Gillvalis is later installed into a Galactron-type body called Last Judgementer Gillvalis (Perfect Form) (ラストジャッジメンター ギルバリス (完全態), Rasuto Jajjimentā Girubarisu (Kanzen-tai)) is armed with the built-in Valis Torretta (バリストレッタ, Barisu Toretta) cannons. Gillvalis' main attacks are the Valis Distruz (バリスデストルツ, Barisu Desutorutsu) ray, the Valis Zione (バリスチオーネ, Barisu Chiōne) energy bullet, the Valis Luce (バリスルーチェ, Barisu Rūche) barrier, and Valis Corona (バリスコルノーラ, Barisu Korunōra) headbutt. His strongest attack is the Valis D'artifi (バリスダルティフィー, Barisu Darutifī) volley from all the cannons including the Valis Braccia (バリスブラチア, Barisu Burachia) cannon arms.

Gillvalis is voiced by Katsuyuki Konishi (小西 克幸, Konishi Katsuyuki).

=== Galactron MK2 ===
Civil Judgementer Galactron MK2 (シビルジャッジメンター ギャラクトロンMK2, Shibiru Jajjimentā Gyarakutoron Māku Tsū) is an enhanced version of Galactron in Ultraman Geed the Movie. It was sent to Earth per Gillvalis' own orders to capture the Red Steel and faced against Geed before retreating. When both Nebula House and AIB went to Okinawa, Galactron MK2 made itself known and faced oppositions in the form of Geed, Orb, Zero and Gukuru Shisa. The robot vanguard easily resisted all of their attacks and digitized Geed into a cyberspace before being rescued by Orb. As a result of Zero and Orb's "sacrifice" to shield Geed from incoming attack, the young Ultra quickly destroyed Galactron MK2 after falling into a berserk rage.

Galactron MK2's main weapons are the Galactron Beil (ギャラクトロンベイル, Gyarakutoron Beiru) battle axe, Galactron Gavert (ギャラクトロンゲベール, Gyarakutoron Gebēru) machine guns, Galactron Strahl (ギャラクトロンシュトラール, Gyarakutoron Shutorāru) beam guns, and Galactron Klinger (ギャラクトロンクリンガー, Gyarakutoron Kuringā) blades. It is also capable of creating the Galactron Barriere (ギャラクトロンバリエアー, Gyarakutoron Barieā) barriers from the Valistel Generatore (バリステルギュネレイター, Barisuteru Gyunereitā) generators and firing the Galactron Fang (ギャラクトロンファング, Gyarakutoron Fangu) capture beams.

=== Valis Raiders ===
The Android Troop Valis Raiders (アンドロイド兵 バリスレイダー, Andoroido Hei Barisu Reidā) are human-sized robot soldiers that are sent by Gillvalis to wipe out all remaining survivors after the Galactron Army attacked the world. They are armed with Raiding Swords (レイディングソード, Reidingu Sōdo).

== Little Star ==
Little Star (リトルスター, Ritoru Sutā) is an energy substance formed after the Childhood Radiation (幼年期放射, Yōnen-ki Hōsha) released by Ultraman King glued to the body of life forms through Kei's Carellen Element (カレラン分子, Kareran Bunshi). His purpose of doing so is to activate the powers of Ultra Capsules and resurrect Belial to his physical form. Since Little Stars can attract monsters, Geed's part as a savior would be crucial to obtain its power. The AIB as well took intervention into this case by developing an enzyme that would dissolve the Carellen Element as alternatives to cure the Little Star symptoms.

Upon activation of a Little Star, the host would develop symptoms of hand fever and radiation lights emerged from their body, followed by the development of an Ultra Warrior's power. The only way to separate them is for their hosts to pray upon the Ultra Warriors.

- Eri Hara (原 エリ, Hara Eri; 1, 2): Yoshiko's daughter and Haruo's niece. She hosted the Little Star of Ultraman Leo, granting her pyrokinesis. After being targeted by both Dada and Skull Gomora, Eri's prayer for Ultraman Geed separated the Little Star for Riku to claim it as Leo Capsule. She is portrayed by Mirai Uchida (内田 未来, Uchida Mirai).
- Toru Honda (本田 トオル, Honda Tōru; 3): A host of the Little Star of Ultraseven, granting him the armor of light for offense and defense. When Toru cheered Geed on, the Little Star separated from the boy for Riku to claim it as Seven Capsule. He is portrayed by Rintaro Mitani (三谷 麟太郎, Mitani Rintarō).
- Alien Pitt "Tree-Tip" (see above)
- Little Peculiar Creature Lunah (小珍獣 ルナー, Shō Chinjū Runā; 5): A small space monster that was adopted by street comedian named Takashi Arai, who gave it the name Moko (モコ). Moko is also a host of the Little Star of Ultraman Cosmos, granting it the ability to heal others which Takashi exploited for money. After being saved by its owner when Moa attempted to confiscate it, Moko's Little Star was salvaged by Geed as Cosmos Capsule and Moko was allowed to remain with Takashi after it proved too difficult for the AIB to contain.
- Mayu Igaguri: (see above)
- Laiha Toba: (see above)
- Sui Asakura (朝倉 錘, Asakura Sui; 12): A retired local administrator who named Riku when he was discovered as a baby. He had hoped to adopt the boy until his wife's death in an accident, forcing him to surrender Riku to the Aizaki family. Three months prior, Sui developed the symptoms of Father of Ultra's Little Star, allowing him to perceive Riku and the current events surrounding him. With months left to live due to an incurable disease, he invited Riku to his house where he told the boy of their history. When Pedanium Zetton try to attack him, his prayer for Riku to live on allowed the boy to gain Father of Ultra's capsule and use it with Zero Capsule into Ultraman Geed Magnificent. In aftermath, Riku decided to visit him again until his illness cured. He is portrayed by Minori Terada (寺田 農, Terada Minori).
- Fujiko Sakura (佐倉 藤子, Sakura Fujiko; 16, 17): A host of the Little Star of Ultraman Jack, allowing her to perform the Ultra's Ultra Spark (ウルトラスパーク, Urutora Supāku). As a result of her gratitude for Geed, Jack's Ultra Capsule is harvested by the Ultra. She is portrayed by Hinano Ishigami (石上 ひなの, Ishigami Hinano).
- Fujio Manga (満賀 富士夫, Manga Fujio; 16, 17): A host of the Little Star of Ultraman Ace, allowing him to perform the Ultra's Vertical Guillotine (バーチカルギロチン, Bāchikaru Girochin). As a result of his gratitude for Geed, Ace's Ultra Capsule is harvested by the Ultra. He is portrayed by Catcher Nakazawa (キャッチャー中澤, Kyatchā Nakazawa).
- Tetsuro Matsumoto (松本 鉄朗, Matsumoto Tetsurō; 16, 17): A host of the Little Star of Ultraman Taro, providing him with pyrokinesis. As a result of his gratitude for Geed, Taro's Ultra Capsule is harvested by the Ultra. He is portrayed by Yukinosuke Takatsuki (髙月 雪乃介, Takatsuki Yukinosuke).
- Deep Sea Monster Gubila (深海怪獣 グビラ, Shinkai Kaijū Gubira; 21): A fish-like monster that hosted the Little Star of Zoffy, which possesses the ability to emit paralyzing sparks from its Die Hard Drill (ダイハード・ドリル, Dai Hādo Doriru) nose. Due to its nature, Gubila was targeted by Kei/Pedanium Zetton before Geed interfered, giving the Ultra an opening to defeat said monster. After the battle, Gubila relinquished the Little Star to Geed (turned into Zoffy Capsule) in gratitude for his rescue. First appeared in episode 24 of Ultraman.

== Other characters ==
Major

- Haruo Kume (久米 ハルヲ, Kume Haruo): (Note: His given name is written in kanji as "晴雄".) Riku's 40-year-old employer and the manager of Ginga Market (銀河マーケット, Ginga Māketto). After both his shop and Riku's home were destroyed by Skull Gomora, Haruo decided to stay at Yoshiko's house for a while and restarted his business under a minivan. He is portrayed by Tadashi Mizuno (水野 直, Mizuno Tadashi).
- Jōji Ōsumi (大隅 丈治, Ōsumi Jōji; 3, 4, 7, 11): Kei's 33-year-old editor in his novels, he was revealed to be cooperating with the AIB to uncover his secret. After Kei foiled their attempts, Jōji was killed sometime later prior to Pedanium Zetton's appearance. The discovery of his corpse led to the downfall of Kei's popularity on Earth as he is on the run from authorities. He is portrayed by Kenji Masaki (柾 賢志, Masaki Kenji).

Minor

- Donshine (ドンシャイン, Donshain; 1, 16, 17): The eponymous protagonist of show within a show tokusatsu series Blasting Chronicler Donshine (爆裂戦記ドンシャイン, Bakuretsu Senki Donshain). His catchphrase "Here We Go!" is used by Riku during his Fusion Rise and is one of his inspiration to become a hero. He is voiced by former Voyager member Tomohiro Yamaguchi (山口 智広, Yamaguchi Tomohiro).
- Satanzorg (サタンゾーグ, Satanzōgu; 1, 16): The main antagonist of Blasting Chronicler Donshine. He is voiced by Hajime Iijima (飯島 肇, Iijima Hajime).
- Yoshiko Hara (原 良子, Hara Yoshiko; 1, 2): Haruo's younger sister. She is portrayed by Hitomi Miwa (三輪 ひとみ, Miwa Hitomi).
- Takashi Arai (新井 タカシ, Arai Takashi; 5): A struggling comedian who has been multiple times ditched by his partners. After finding Moco, Takashi adopted and took advantage of the animal's Little Star but shows genuine friendship while saving Moco from Arstron. Although it lost the Little Star to Geed, Takashi restarted his comedian career with Moco as his partner. He is portrayed by Ryosuke Kato (加藤 良輔, Katō Ryōsuke).
- Danji Toba (鳥羽 ダンジ, Toba Danji; 9) and Suzumi (スズミ; 9): (Note: Their given names are written in kanji as "弾次" and "涼美".) Laiha's parents who were killed by Skull Gomora six years ago. They are portrayed by Megumi Uemura (植村 恵, Uemura Megumi) and Kokoro Hiho (妃鳳 こころ, Hihō Kokoro) respectively.

== Other monsters and aliens ==
=== Good ===
- Spoiled Child Monster Zandrias (だだっ子怪獣 ザンドリアス, Dadakko Kaijū Zandoriasu; 10): A Pterasaur-like monster whose kind is first seen in episode 4 of Ultraman 80. A young Zandrias male came to Earth out of depression from his own mate, unable to physically leave the planet while throwing temper tantrums. Once Nabia found out the Zandrias' personal problem, Moa encouraged the monster not to give up on love while Zero knocks him back into space to be reunited with his mate.
- Kushia (クシア人, Kushia-jin): An ancient race that was wiped out by Gillvalis. In the past, they were revealed to be the true creator of Giga Battlenizer, the same weapon that Belial used in his conquest for power.
  - Airu Higa (比嘉 愛琉, Higa Airu; Movie): The 33,000-year-old last surviving member of the Kushia named Airu Saderuna (アイル・サデルーナ, Airu Saderūna) who posed as a tour guide of Okinawa Prefecture. She enlisted the help of Ultraman Geed to overcome a new threat. She is portrayed by Yuika Motokariya (本仮屋 ユイカ, Motokariya Yuika).
  - Buran Saderuna (ブラン・サデルーナ, Buran Saderūna; Movie): Airu's late father and a scientist who created the Giga Finalizer. When driven into a corner by a number of Galactrons, he sacrificed himself to save his daughter and creation. He is portrayed by Kai Shishido (宍戸 開, Shishido Kai), previously portraying Captain Shigeru Hijikata in Ultraman Max.
- Phantom Demon Jugglus Juggler (無幻魔人 ジャグラスジャグラー, Mugen Majin Jagurasu Jagurā; Movie): The former antagonist from Ultraman Orb, who had since reformed. He provided Riku with the guidance of "red steel" in Okinawa. He is reprised by Takaya Aoyagi (青柳 尊哉, Aoyagi Takaya).
- Lion Sacred Beast Gukuru Shisa (獅子聖獣 グクルシーサー, Shishi Sejū Gukuru Shīsā; Movie): A shisa-like ancient guardian monster of Okinawa. Gukuru Shisa protects the "red steel" in the form of a stone statue. Its strongest attacks are the Shisa Scratching (シーサースクラッチング, Shīsā Sukuratchingu), using its Gukuru Chimi (グクルチミー, Gukuru Chimī) claws, and the Tail Whipper (テールホイッパー, Tēru Hoippā), using its Gukuru Tail (グクルテール, Gukuru Tēru).

=== Evil ===
- Three-faced Phantom Dada (三面怪人 ダダ, Sanmen Kaijin Dada): Dadaism-themed aliens from the Planet Dada who identify themselves with digit numbers, the race having first appeared in episode 28 of Ultraman. The Dada race are among the victims of Belial's evil regiment that was once reigned the universe.
  - 820 (2): A Dada, armed with a Micronizer Gun (ミクロ化器銃, Mikuro-ka Kijū), attempts to kidnap Eri for her Little Star after knocking her family unconscious, only for Riku and Laiha to intervene. While hiding after his failure, Dada was killed for his interference by Kei. He is voiced by Kōichi Toshima (外島 孝一, Toshima Kōichi).
  - 116 (18): A Dada arrives to Earth after Belial's demise, planning to take over the universe in his place and going after an amnesiac Kei to avenge his comrades in a hijacked Legionoid. Though Zero intercepted him on the first attempt, the Dada finds Kei and ends up being killed when he caused Kei to regain his memories and summoned Zaigorg to destroy the Legionoid. He is voiced by Shouma Yamamoto (山本 匠馬, Yamamoto Shōma).
  - Imperial Machine Soldier Legionoid Dada Customize (帝国機兵 レギオノイド ダダ・カスタマイズ, Teikoku Kihei Regionoido Dada Kasutamaizu; 18): Originally a Legionoid that served under Kaiser Belial, this model was hijacked and remodeled by the Dada race for its use, having normal hands that can switch to Double Arm Drill (ダブルアームドリル, Daburu Āmu Doriru) of Legionoid Alpha or Legionoid Gun Beam (レギオノイドガンビーム, Regionoido Gan Bīmu) of Legionoid Beta. Dada 116 brought the Legionoid to Earth to hunt down an amnesiac Kei, only for its second attempt to accidentally restore Kei's memories as he summons Zaigorg to destroy the robot alongside its pilot.
- Collective Alien Alien Huk (集団宇宙人 フック星人, Shūdan Uchūjin Fukku Seijin; 4): An alien from the Planet Huk whose kind first appeared in episode 47 of Ultraseven. Huk gets arrested by Moa and Zenna when they confirmed that he smuggled an illegal plant called the Lugus (ルグス, Rugusu) to Earth, resulting in his deportation from the planet. Moa would use the Lugus later on to sedate Eleking long enough for Geed to counterattack. He is voiced by You Murakami (村上 ヨウ, Murakami Yō).
- Space Emperor Alien Bado (宇宙帝王 バド星人, Uchū Teiō Bado Seijin; 11): A sniper belong to a race of superior-minded genocidal maniacs whose kind first terrorized Earth in episode 19 of Ultraseven. Armed with a Space Rifle (宇宙ライフル, Uchū Raifuru), Bado was hired by Kei to keep Laiha from interfering in his meeting with Riku while given orders to snipe civilians should she elude him. Pega manages to distract the Bado long enough for Laiha to reach his location and fight him, the Bado attempting to snipe Geed before being crushed by incoming debris during his fight against Pedanium Zetton. He is voiced by Holly Kaneko (金子 はりい, Kaneko Harii).
- Insect Alien Alien Ckalutch (昆虫宇宙人 クカラッチ星人, Konchū Uchūjin Kukaratchi Seijin; 14): An alien who illegally stayed on Earth, not wanting to get out before being apprehended by both Moa and Kuruto. He is voiced by Yūki Hirashita (平下 侑樹, Hirashita Yūki) and first appeared in Ultraman Orb The Movie.
- Space Guerrilla Alien Shadow (宇宙ゲリラ シャドー星人, Uchū Gerira Shadō Seijin): A race of notorious invaders whose infamous for the use of guerrilla tactic. Their invasion on other planets stem from the need for their race to survive. As a result of their conflict with Belial, their original planet became inhabitable and the rest of their kin scattered across the space. First appeared in episode 23 of Ultraseven.
  - Kuruto (クルト; 14, 15): The last surviving Gabra Cano and Zenna's final student. He trained himself to emote and speak with his mouth while subduing Zenna as he posed as an AIB agent who assumes the human identity of Kuruto Kageyama (影山 来人, Kageyama Kuruto). After retrieving Zegun, Kuruto tries to invade Earth in hopes of restoring Planet Shadow's glory, despising his former teacher for joining AIB instead. Although Zenna offered his life as an exchange while others try to reason with him, Kuruto saw himself beyond redemption and orchestrate his death by allowing Zegun to be contained by the Ultramen and had Zegun continue its attack before he is consumed in the resulting explosion. He is portrayed by Hiroki Suzuki (鈴木 裕樹, Suzuki Hiroki).
- Anti-Gravity Alien Alien Godola (反重力宇宙人 ゴドラ星人, Han Jūryoku Uchūjin Godora Seijin; 16, 17): A race of aliens whose naturally armed with the Godora Gun (ゴドラガン, Godora Gan) on their pincers. Their main goal is to exploit the powers of Little Stars as part of their military strength and to restore the glory of their planet. While Godo deals with the Little Stars, another operative tried to sneak attack on Zenna before the latter turn the tables. He was deported away by Zenna after Chimeraberus' departure. He is voiced by Tetsuo Kishi (岸 哲生, Kishi Tetsuo) and first appeared in episode 4 of Ultraseven.
  - Godo Wynn (ゴドー＝ウィン, Godō Win; 16): A Godola who slipped into AIB, posing as a fellow scientist that assisted Tree-Tip in studying the Little Stars. Upon showing his true color, Godo try to take an injured Tri and other Little Stars (including Laiha) with him before he was overwhelmed by Laiha. While growing large and fighting against Geed, Godo was killed by the newly arrived Belial. He is portrayed by Shinji Ozeki (尾関 伸嗣, Ozeki Shinji).
- Electric Wave Phantom Lecuum (電波怪人 レキューム人, Denpa Kaijin Rekyūmu-jin; 20): An information broker who relays the news of Alien Empera and Dark Lugiel Capsules to Kei Fukuide. He is voiced by Kenta Matsumoto and first appeared in episode 26 of Ultra Q: Dark Fantasy.
- Alien Reiblood (レイブラッド星人, Reiburaddo Seijin; 25): An alien whose responsible for transforming Belial into his current state. He was mentioned in a flashback during Geed and Belial's final battle as Riku tapped into Belial's previous memories.
- Darkness Five (ダークネスファイブ, Dākunesu Faibu; 25): A group of five aliens assembled by Belial during his conquest. Within Belial's flashback, they were only shown alongside Kei as Belial prepared for his fight against the Ultra Warriors.
- Ghost Sorcerer Reibatos (亡霊魔道士 レイバトス, Bōrei Madō-shi Reibatosu; 0, 25): The main antagonist of Ultra Fight Orb. Although the original story featured his death by Geed, Riku's discovery of Belial's memory retcons the event with his father as Reibatos' true murderer.
- Aliens in the Side Space Ninth District (サイドスペース第9地区, Saido Supēsu Dai-kyū Chiku) (Movie): The aliens who illegally stay on Earth and live in their secret alien town in Okinawa.
  - Alien Jaki "Arlong" (ジャキ星人 アーロン, Jaki Seijin Āron): An information broker who is based in the bar MJ Galilei (MJガリレー, Emu Jei Garirē) (Note: "MJ" is based on the initials of a Space Thief Alien Marjar (宇宙盗賊 マージャー星人, Uchū Tōzoku Mājā Seijin), the boss of the Side Space Ninth District who is not shown in the film.) located in the town. He is portrayed by Jackie-chan (ジャッキーちゃん, Jakkī-chan).
  - Galmess (ガルメス人, Garumesu-jin): First appeared in Ultraman Orb The Movie.
  - Iron Bull Alien Bruck (鉄牛星人 ブルック, Tetsugyū Seijin Burukku)
  - Space Yeti Rawaan (宇宙野人 ラワーン人, Uchū Yajin Rawān-jin)
  - Assassin Alien Alien Nackle (暗殺宇宙人 ナックル星人, Ansatsu Uchūjin Nakkuru Seijin): First appeared in episode 37 of Return of Ultraman.
  - Slaughter Alien Hypnas (殺戮宇宙人 ヒュプナス, Satsuriku Uchūjin Hyupunasu): First appeared in episode 8 of Ultraseven X.
  - Darkness Alien Alien Shaplay
  - Alien Doble
  - Strong Phantom Idalarda (剛力怪人 イダラーダ, Gōriki Kaijin Idarāda)
  - Plant Alien Ruffle (植物宇宙人 ルフル, Shokubutsu Uchūjin Rufuru)
  - Space Ogre Alien Gemaha (宇宙鬼 ゲマハ星人, Uchū Oni Gemaha Seijin)
  - Demon World Man Magdom (魔界人 マグドム, Makai-jin Magudomu)
  - Space Emperor Alien Bado
  - Abduction Phantom Kemur (誘拐怪人 ケムール人, Yūkai Kaijin Kemūru-jin): First appeared in episode 19 of Ultra Q.
  - Electric Wave Phantom Lecuum
  - Invading Alien Alien Norvar (侵略宇宙人 ノルヴァー星雲人, Shinryaku Uchūjin Noruvā Seiunjin)
  - Insect Alien Alien Ckalutch

=== Neutral ===
- Underground Monster Telesdon (地底怪獣 テレスドン, Chitei Kaijū Teresudon; 0): A monster that was shown in the Pre-Premier special as a demonstration for Geed's Acro Smasher form. First appeared in episode 22 of Ultraman.
- Space Monster Eleking (宇宙怪獣 エレキング, Uchū Kaijū Erekingu; 4): An electric-eel-like reptilian native to Planet Pitt that is used as a biological weapon by the Pitt race, having first appeared in episode 3 of Ultraseven. Like many of its species, Eleking was intended by a Pitt invasion force to attack Earth. But Tree-Tip, having grown to love Earth, spirited the infant Eleking to the planet and hid it away. But the fully matured Eleking is later revived by the Little Star in Tree-Tip's body, instinctively pursuing her for the energy. Though Geed assumes his Solid Burning form to destroy Eleking, Kei harvested Eleking's remains to create the Eleking Capsule (エレキングカプセル, Erekingu Kapuseru).
- Marine Animal Samekujira (海獣 サメクジラ, Kaijū Samekujira; 5): A species of aquatic monster native to Planet Valky, originally kept as pets due to their adorable appearance until they were abandoned out of fear being monster weapons. Zenna and Moa managed to find an abandoned baby Samekujira before it ended up in the wrong hands. First appeared in episode 53 of Ultraman Taro.
- Berserk Monster Arstron (凶暴怪獣 アーストロン, Kyōbō Kaijū Āsutoron; 5): A monster on that appeared in wake of Moco's Little Star to track its source, Geed using his powers in Acro Smasher form to pacify Arstron and convince it to leave peacefully. First appeared in episode 1 of Return of Ultraman.
- Dark Alien Alien Shaplay (暗黒星人 シャプレー星人, Ankoku Seijin Shapurē Seijin; 6): Mentioned only by RE.M., the race's disguise badge Shaplay Metal (シャプレーメタル, Shapurē Metaru) was replicated by her for Riku to use while disguising as Leito, which also allows Pega to conceal his appearance without the need of Dark Zone. First appeared in episode 20 of Ultraseven.
- Despot Monster Tyrant (暴君怪獣 タイラント, Bōkun Kaijū Tairanto; 9): A monster that attempted to dig the Nebula House for Mayu's Little Star. It was quickly defeated by Ultraman Zero Beyond's Wide Beyond Shot. First appeared in episode 40 of Ultraman Taro.
- Space Phantom Alien Zelan (15): Another Zelan (different from the AIB operative) was shown in Moa's past, who was tended by her after being exhausted.
