= Ultraman Chronicle D =

TV show

- The poster for Ultraman Chronicle D with most of the Ultra Warriors in it, with Ultraman Trigger and Dyna as the main focus.
- Created by: Tsuburaya Productions
- Starring: M・A・O; Risae Matsuda
- Country of origin: Japan
- No. of episodes: 22

Production
- Running time: 30 minutes

Original release
- Network: TV Tokyo
- Release: January 29 – June 25, 2022

Related
- Ultraman Chronicle Z: Heroes' Odyssey; Ultraman New Generation Stars

Ultraman Chronicle D (ウルトラマン クロニクルD, Urutoraman Kuronikuru Dī) is a biography series produced by Tsuburaya Productions created to commemorate the 25th anniversary of Ultraman Dyna. It features the main casts, Alien Metron "Marluru" of Ultraman Trigger: New Generation Tiga and Deban from Ultraman Tiga as navigators in an old house welcoming guests as they describe the past exploits of Ultraman Dyna and Ultraman Trigger in their respective shows.

The show premiered on TV Tokyo on January 29, 2022, effectively a week after the end of Ultraman Trigger: New Generation Tiga.

== Episodes ==
1. It's Your Turn, Ultraman! (出番だ！ウルトラマン, Deban da! Urutoraman)
2. Type Changing Heroes (タイプチェンジヒーロー, Taipu Chenji Hīrō)
3. The Return of Hanejiro! (帰ってきた！ハネジロー, Kaettekita! Hanejirō)
4. Dearest Friends (親愛なる仲間たち, Shin'ainaru Nakama-tachi)
5. Ultraman of Evil? (悪？のウルトラマン, Aku? no Urutoraman)
6. Ultras Who Fight Together (共に立ち向かうウルトラマン, Tomo ni Tachimukau Urutoraman)
7. Individual Feelings (それぞれの想い, Sorezore no Omoi)
8. Saviors Rush to the Rescue (駆けつける救世主, Kaketsukeru Kyūseishu)
9. Beyond Light and Darkness (光と闇のその先へ, Hikari to Yami no Sono Saki e)
10. Order from the Inter Galactic Defense Force (宇宙警備隊からの指令, Uchū Keibitai kara no Shirei)
11. New Generation Heroes (ニュージェネレーションヒーローズ, Nyū Jenerēshon Hīrōzu)
12. A New Challenge (新たなる試練, Aratanaru Shiren)
13. The Absolute Conspiracy (大いなる陰謀, Ōinaru Inbō)
14. Ultras Led by Fate (運命に導かれたウルトラマン, Unmei ni Michibikareta Urutoraman)
15. The Bond of Ultra Warriors (ウルトラ戦士の絆, Urutora Senshi no Kizuna)
16. Let's Heat Up Together! (燃え上れ！仲間と共に, Moeagare! Nakama to Tomo ni)
17. Special Airborne Armor Analysis! (解説！特空機, Kaisetsu! Tokkūki)
18. A Look at Mechanical Monsters! (教えて！メカ怪獣, Oshiete! Meka Kaijū)
19. Who Is Ultraman? (ウルトラマンの正体は？, Urutoraman no Shōtai wa?)
20. You Alone I Want to Protect (君だけを守りたい, Kimi dake o Mamoritai)
21. The Inherited Light (受け継がれる光, Uketsugareru Hikari)
22. The Hero of Light Arises (立ち上がる光の勇者, Tachiagaru Hikari no Yūsha)

== Cast ==
- Alien Metron "Marluru" (メトロン星人 マルゥル, Metoron Seijin Marwuru; Voice): M・A・O
- Deban (デバン; Voice): Risae Matsuda (松田 利冴, Matsuda Risae)
- Kengo Manaka (マナカ ケンゴ, Manaka Kengo; 8, 9, 21, 22): Raiga Terasaka (寺坂 頼我, Terasaka Raiga)
- Alien Pegassa "Pega" (ペガッサ星人 ペガ, Pegassa Seijin Pega; Voice; 10-16): Megumi Han (潘 めぐみ, Han Megumi)
- Riku Asakura (朝倉 リク, Asakura Riku; 14-16): Tatsuomi Hamada (濱田 龍臣, Hamada Tatsuomi)
- Haruki Natsukawa (ナツカワ ハルキ, Natsukawa Haruki; 17, 18): Kohshu Hirano (平野 宏周, Hirano Kōshū)

== Theme song ==
- "Kimi dake o Mamoritai" (君だけを守りたい; "You Alone I Want to Protect")
  - Lyrics & Composition: Toshihiko Takamizawa (高見沢 俊彦, Takamizawa Toshihiko)
  - Arrangement: Takao Konishi (小西 貴雄, Konishi Takao)
  - Artist: Voyager (ボイジャー, Boijā)
