= Ultraman New Generation Chronicle =

- Series poster
- Created by: Tsuburaya Productions
- Starring: Miina Tominaga; Megumi Han
- Country of origin: Japan
- No. of episodes: 26

Production
- Running time: 24–25 min. (per episode)

Original release
- Network: TV Tokyo
- Release: January 5 – June 29, 2019

Related
- Ultraman Orb: The Chronicle; Ultraman Chronicle Zero & Geed

Ultraman New Generation Chronicle (ウルトラマン ニュージェネレーションクロニクル, Urutoraman Nyū Jenerēshon Kuronikuru) is a biography series produced by Tsuburaya Productions. Featuring Booska and Alien Pegassa Pega, they navigate the viewers to New Generation Hero (ニュージェネレーションヒーロー, Nyū Jenerēshon Hīrō) media of Ultra Series, ranging from Ultraman Ginga up to Ultraman R/B.

== Episodes ==
1. Opening! New Generation Chronicle!! (開演！ニュージェネレーションクロニクル！！, Kaien! Nyū Jenerēshon Kuronikuru!!)
2. Unite! A Voice from the Starry Sky!! (ユナイト！星空の声！！, Yunaito! Hoshizora no Koe!!)
3. Prepare to Decide! Welcome to the Secret Base!! (覚悟を決めろ！秘密基地へようこそ！！, Kakugo o Kimero! Himitsu Kichi e Yōkoso!!)
4. The Strange Creature and the Boy! Gan-Q's Tears!! (奇獣と少年！ガンQの涙！！, Ki-jū to Shōnen! Gan Kyū no Namida!!)
5. Tremble! Forgotten Past!! (戦慄！忘れ去られた過去！！, Senritsu! Wasuresarareta Kako!!)
6. Activate! Magnewave Operation!! (発動！マグネウェーブ作戦！！, Hatsudō! Magunewēbu Sakusen!!)
7. Showdown! Desperate Battle for Sunrise!! (決戦！朝焼けの死闘！！, Kessen! Asayake no Shitō!!)
8. Ultraman Geed: Connect the Wishes! ~1~ (ウルトラマンジード つなぐぜ！願い！！ ~1~, Urutoraman Jīdo Tsunagu ze! Negai!! ~1~)
9. Ultraman Geed: Connect the Wishes! ~2~ (ウルトラマンジード つなぐぜ！願い！！ ~2~, Urutoraman Jīdo Tsunagu ze! Negai!! ~2~)
10. Ultraman Geed: Connect the Wishes! ~3~ (ウルトラマンジード つなぐぜ！願い！！ ~3~, Urutoraman Jīdo Tsunagu ze! Negai!! ~3~)
11. Ultraman R/B Summary: Color Me With Your Powers!! Part 1 (ウルトラマンR/B 総集編 オレ色に！染め上げろ！！ 前編, Urutoraman Rūbu Shōshūsen Ore-iro ni! Someagero!! Zenpen)
12. Ultraman R/B Summary: Color Me With Your Powers!! Part 2 (ウルトラマンR/B 総集編 オレ色に！染め上げろ！！ 後編, Urutoraman Rūbu Shōshūsen Ore-iro ni! Someagero!! Kōhen)
13. Evil! Another Chronicle!! (邪悪！もうひとつのクロニクル！！, Jāku! Mō hitotsu no Kuronikuru!!)
14. Invasion! A Beautiful End!! (襲来！美しき終焉！！, Shūrai! Utsukushiki Shuen!!)
15. Breath! The Rainbow Land!! (息吹け！虹の大地！！, Ibuke! Niji no Daichi!!)
16. Ultraman X: Here He Comes! Our Ultraman!! ~1~ (ウルトラマンX きたぞ！我らのウルトラマン！！ ①, Urutoraman Ekkusu Kita zo! Warera no Urutoraman!! 1)
17. Ultraman X: Here He Comes! Our Ultraman!! ~2~ (ウルトラマンX きたぞ！我らのウルトラマン！！ ②, Urutoraman Ekkusu Kita zo! Warera no Urutoraman!! 2)
18. Ultraman X: Here He Comes! Our Ultraman!! ~3~ (ウルトラマンX きたぞ！我らのウルトラマン！！ ③, Urutoraman Ekkusu Kita zo! Warera no Urutoraman!! 3)
19. Ruthless! Justice Out of Control!! (無情！暴走する正義！！, Mujō! Bōsō Suru Seigi!!)
20. Violent Emotion! Never Say Never!! (激情！ネバー・セイ・ネバー！！, Gekijō! Nebā Sei Nebā!!)
21. The Plan! Sacrifice!! (計略！サクリファイス！！, Keiryaku! Sakurifaisu!!)
22. Flash! Going Beyond Fate!! (閃烈！運命を越えて行け！！, Senretsu! Unmei o Koeteike!!)
23. Union! The Fragments of Hope!! (結束！キボウノカケラ！！, Kessoku! Kibō no Kakera!!))
24. Shine! The Symbol of Geed!! (照らすぜ！GEEDの証！！, Terasu ze! Jīdo no Akashi!!)
25. Ultraman Taro Big Introduction: Genealogy! Burning History!! (ウルトラマンタロウ大紹介 系譜！バーニング列伝！！, Urutoraman Tarō Dai Shōkai Keifu! Bāningu Retsuden!!)
26. Ultraman Taiga Pre-Premiere Special: Inheritance! Entrust to the New History!! (ウルトラマンタイガ直前SP 相伝！未来に託せ新列伝！！, Urutoraman Taiga Chokuzen Supesharu Sōden! Mirai ni Takuse Shin Retsuden!!)

== Cast ==
- Riku Asakura (朝倉 リク, Asakura Riku; 1, 26): Tatsuomi Hamada (濱田 龍臣, Hamada Tatsuomi)
- Marukyū manager (丸九店長, Marukyū Tenchō; 3, 4): Seira (星羅)
- Mana (マナ; 5-7): Moga Mogami (最上 もが, Mogami Moga)
- Katsumi Minato (湊 カツミ, Minato Katsumi; 11, 12, 26): Yuya Hirata (平田 雄也, Hirata Yūya)
- Isami Minato (湊 イサミ, Minato Isami; 11, 12, 26): Ryosuke Koike (小池 亮介, Koike Ryōsuke)
- Asahi Minato (湊 アサヒ, Minato Asahi; 12): Arisa Sonohara (其原 有沙, Sonohara Arisa)
- Daichi Ozora (大空 大地, Ōzora Daichi; 14, 15, 26): Kensuke Takahashi (高橋 健介, Takahashi Kensuke)
- Makoto Aizen (愛染 マコト, Aizen Makoto; 19, 20): Motoki Fukami (深水 元基, Fukami Motoki)
- Leito Igaguri (伊賀栗 レイト, Igaguri Reito; 21, 22): Yuta Ozawa (小澤 雄太, Ozawa Yūta)
- Hikaru Raido (礼堂 ヒカル, Raidō Hikaru; 26): Takuya Negishi (根岸 拓哉, Negishi Takuya)
- Sho (ショウ, Shō; 26): Kiyotaka Uji (宇治 清高, Uji Kiyotaka)
- Gai Kurenai (クレナイ・ガイ, Kurenai Gai; 26): Hideo Ishiguro (石黒 英雄, Ishiguro Hideo)

=== Voice actors ===
- Booska (ブースカ, Būsuka): Miina Tominaga (冨永 みーな, Tominaga Mīna)
- Alien Pegassa "Pega" (ペガッサ星人 ペガ, Pegassa Seijin Pega): Megumi Han (潘 めぐみ, Han Megumi)
- Ultraman Tregear (ウルトラマントレギア, Urutoraman Toregia; 13): Yuma Uchida (内田 雄馬, Uchida Yūma)
- Narration: Kōichi Toshima (外島 孝一, Toshima Kōichi)

== Theme song ==
- "Hope the youth"
  - Lyrics & Composition: Tatsuya Ozeki (小関 竜矢, Ozeki Tatsuya)
  - Arrangement: Bentham, PRIMAGIC
  - Artist: Bentham
  - Episodes: 1-13 (Verse 1); 14-26 (Verse 2)
