= Ai Kidosaki =

Japanese author (1925–2020)

Ai Kidosaki (城戸崎 愛, Kidosaki Ai; 1 July 1925 – 13 February 2020) was a Japanese author and chef best known for her career on the Kyō no Ryōri cooking programme.

== Biography ==
Ai Kidosaki was born on 1 July 1925 in Kobe and was educated at the Tokyo Kasei-Gakuin University cooking school and Le Cordon Bleu in Paris, the latter where her husband was appointed.

She was diagnosed with uterine cancer and received treatment to cure the disease while she was thirty years old. After her discharge from the hospital, she taught cooking to hospital employees, leading her to start a career as a chef. In 1971, she made her first appearance in Kyō no Ryōri, a cooking show that airs on NHK. During her career, Kidosaki, who later received the nickname Love-obasan (ラブおばさん), was a prominent contributor to culinary culture with her recipes, and as a culinary researcher, wrote several books stressing the importance of home cooking. She also introduced people to home cooking and sweets in several magazines published by Shueisha, including Non-no and "MORE". She won the 2007 NHK Culture Award.

In a 2004 interview with the s-woman.net website conducted after the publication of her essay Senka to Donuts to Ai, which she co-authored with Ryōko Yui, she stated that she wanted to encourage the youth to value their own lives instead of going to war.

Kidosaki was ill during the last years of her life and was hospitalized several times, but she was able to publish her book Shoku wa ikiruchikara 91-sai, gen'eki ryōri-ka no inochi no reshipi (食は生きる力91歳、現役料理家の命のレシピ) while she was in her nineties. She died at the age of 94 of acute heart failure in a Tokyo Metropolis hospital on 13 February 2020.

== Works ==
- Tsutaetai aji (伝えたい味)
- Senka to Donuts to Ai (戦火とドーナツと愛)
- Shoku wa ikiruchikara 91-sai, gen'eki ryōri-ka no inochi no reshipi (食は生きる力91歳、現役料理家の命のレシピ)
