= Ultraman Chronicle Zero & Geed =

- The series' poster, featuring Ultraman Zero (left) and Ultraman Geed (right).
- Created by: Tsuburaya Productions
- Starring: Tatsuomi Hamada
- Country of origin: Japan
- No. of episodes: 23

Production
- Running time: 24–25 min. (per episode)

Original release
- Network: TV Tokyo
- Release: January 11 – June 13, 2020

Related
- Ultraman New Generation Chronicle; Ultraman Chronicle Z: Heroes' Odyssey

Ultraman Chronicle Zero & Geed (ウルトラマン クロニクル ZERO(ゼロ)&GEED(ジード), Urutoraman Kuronikuru Zero Ando Jīdo) is a biography series produced by Tsuburaya Productions created to commemorate the 10th anniversary of Ultraman Zero. Featuring Riku Asakura, he navigates the viewers to compilation clips featuring Zero's appearance throughout past media, in addition to his exploits in Ultraman Geed. The show premiered on January 11, 2020, on the Japanese television network TV Tokyo at the time of 9:00 am.

== Episodes ==
1. Learn the History!! (学ぶぜ! 歴史!!, Manabu ze! Rekishi!!)
2. Spot the Imposter!! (見切るぜ! 偽物!!, Mikiru ze! Nisemono!!)
3. Conquer the Battle!! (制すぜ! 決闘!!, Seisu ze! Kettō!!)
4. Want for the Earth!! (望むぜ! 地球!!, Nozomu ze! Chikyū!!)
5. Live for Humanity!! (生きるぜ! 人類!!, Ikiru ze! Jinrui!!)
6. Protect Tomorrow!! (守るぜ! 明日!!, Mamoru ze! Ashita!!)
7. Overcome the Adversity!! (気張るぜ! 逆境!!, Kibaru ze! Gyakkyō!!)
8. Continue for the Future!! (続くぜ! 未来!!, Tsuzuku ze! Mirai!!)
9. Overflow for the Trial!! (滾るぜ! 試練!!, Tagiru ze! Shiren!!)
10. Circulate the Shine!! (巡るぜ! 輝き!!, Meguru ze! Kagayaki!!)
11. The Rule of the Machine Is Approaching! (機械の支配が迫りくるぜ!, Kikai no Shihai ga Semarikuru ze!)
12. The Connected Wish Blows! (つないだ願いが吹きすさぶぜ!, Tsunaida Negai ga Fukisusabu ze!)
13. Inherit the Spirit!! (受け継げ! 精神!!, Uketsuge! Seishin!!)
14. Ultraman Geed! Belial's Son!! (ウルトラマンジード! ベリアルの息子だ!!, Urutoraman Jīdo! Beriaru no Musuko da!!)
15. Understand and Become Friends! (理解しあって仲間になるぜ!, Rikai Shiatte Nakama ni Naru ze!)
16. Prepare to Become Zero (ゼロになる覚悟, Zero ni Naru Kakugo)
17. Your Name Is Riku Asakura (君の名は朝倉リク, Kimi no Na wa Asakura Riku)
18. Finish the Mission (使命をフィニッシュ, Shimei o Finisshu)
19. Change Fate! (運命を変えていけ!, Unmei o Kaeteike!)
20. Don't Let Him Put the End Mark! (エンドマークを打たせるな!, Endo Māku o Utaseru na!)
21. This Is the Symbol of Geed! (これがGEEDの証だ!, Kore ga Jīdo no Akashi da!)
22. Color You With Your Powers!! (キミ色に! 染め上げろ!!, Kimi-iro ni! Someagero!!)
23. Ultraman Z Pre-Premiere SP: The Young Warrior's Hot Blood History (ウルトラマン Z直前SP ~若き戦士の熱血列伝~, Urutoraman Zetto Chokuzen Supesharu Wakaki Senshi no Nekketsu Retsuden)

== Cast ==
- Riku Asakura (朝倉 リク, Asakura Riku): Tatsuomi Hamada (濱田 龍臣, Hamada Tatsuomi)
- Leito Igaguri (伊賀栗 レイト, Igaguri Reito; 14, 16): Yuta Ozawa (小澤 雄太, Ozawa Yūta)
- Jugglus Juggler (ジャグラスジャグラー, Jagurasu Jagurā; 18): Takaya Aoyagi (青柳 尊哉, Aoyagi Takaya)

=== Voice actors ===
- Alien Pegassa "Pega" (ペガッサ星人 ペガ, Pegassa Seijin Pega), Alien Pegassa (2, 3, 5, 6): Megumi Han (潘 めぐみ, Han Megumi)
- Glenfire (グレンファイヤー, Gurenfaiyā; 1, 4, 7): Tomokazu Seki (関 智一, Seki Tomokazu)
- Mirror Knight (ミラーナイト, Mirā Naito; 2, 3): Hikaru Midorikawa (緑川 光, Midorikawa Hikaru)
- Jean-Bot (ジャンボット, Jan Botto; 5, 6): Hiroshi Kamiya (神谷 浩史, Kamiya Hiroshi)
- Alien Groza (グローザ星系人, Gurōza Seikeijin; 5, 6, 9-12, 14, 15, 17): Nao Nakanishi (中西 南央, Nakanishi Nao)
- Cicadaman "Semika" (セミ人間 セミカ, Semi Ningen Semika; 5, 6, 9-12, 14, 15, 17): Sachi Kokuryu (國立 幸, Kokuryū Sachi)
- Cicadaman "Semiya" (セミ人間 セミヤ, Semi Ningen Semiya; 5, 6, 9-12, 14, 15, 17): Daisuke Fujita (藤田 大助, Fujita Daisuke)
- Alien Mefilas (メフィラス星人, Mefirasu Seijin; 5, 6): Tetsuo Kishi (岸 哲生, Kishi Tetsuo)
- Ultraman Zero (ウルトラマンゼロ, Urutoraman Zero; 8-23): Mamoru Miyano (宮野 真守, Miyano Mamoru)

== Theme song ==
- "Heroes"
  - Lyrics: Ryota Fujimaki, Ren Shidō (紫藤 廉, Shidō Ren)
  - Composition, Arrangement, & Artist: Ryota Fujimaki (藤巻 亮太, Fujimaki Ryōta)
  - Episodes: 1–12, 23 (Verse 1); 13-23 (Verse 2)
