= Ultraman Chronicle Z: Heroes' Odyssey =

TV show

- The poster for Ultraman Chronicle Z: Heroes' Odyssey, featuring Ultraman Zero, Ultraman Z and Ultraman Tiga in their varying forms.
- Created by: Tsuburaya Productions
- Starring: Mamoru Miyano
- Country of origin: Japan
- No. of episodes: 25

Production
- Running time: 30 minutes

Original release
- Network: TV Tokyo
- Release: January 9 – June 26, 2021

Related
- Ultraman Chronicle Zero & Geed; Ultraman Chronicle D

Ultraman Chronicle Z: Heroes' Odyssey (ウルトラマン クロニクルZ ヒーローズオデッセイ, Urutoraman Kuronikuru Zetto Hīrōzu Odessei) is a biography television series produced by Tsuburaya Productions to commemorate the 25th anniversary of the TDG series Ultraman Tiga, Ultraman Dyna and Ultraman Gaia (Note: Despite its use of episodes from Ultraman Tiga, the main protagonist Daigo Madoka was edited out due to the strict policy of Johnny & Associates implemented to their actors, including Daigo's actor Hiroshi Nagano.) and commemorate its 55th anniversary of the franchise. Like the series before it, Ultraman Chronicle Zero & Geed, it features Ultraman Zero as the show's main navigator, serving as the bridge to the eras of Tiga and Ultraman Z. It first aired at 9 A.M. on January 9, 2021 on TV Tokyo.

== Episodes ==
1. Connect to TIGA
2. Growing Brave (グローイングブレイブ, Gurōingu Bureibu)
3. The Light of Courage Appears (勇気の光があらわれる, Yūki no Hikari ga Arawareru)
4. To the Future You Await (君の待つ明日ヘ, Kimi no Matsu Ashita e)
5. For What and for Whom (なんのために 誰のために, Nan no Tame ni Dare no Tame ni)
6. Fight Together (共に戦え, Tomo ni Tatakae)
7. Not One Step Back (ここから一歩もさがらない, Koko kara Ippo mo Sagaranai)
8. What You Bear as You Waver (何を背負い揺れ動く, Nani o Seoi Yureugoku)
9. The Tested Tomorrow (試される明日, Tamesareru Ashita)
10. Spark! Link Your Heart and Power (スパーク！心と力をリンクさせ, Supāku! Kokoro to Chikara o Rinku Sase)
11. Warriors of the Planet of Light: Part 1 (光の星の戦士たち・前編, Hikari no Hoshi no Senshi-tachi Zenpen)
12. Warriors of the Planet of Light: Part 2 (光の星の戦士たち・後編, Hikari no Hoshi no Senshi-tachi Kōhen)
13. Battle in Hyper Space: Part 1 (超時空の大決戦・前編, Chō Jikū no Dai Kessen Zenpen)
14. Battle in Hyper Space: Part 2 (超時空の大決戦・中編, Chō Jikū no Dai Kessen Chūhen)
15. Battle in Hyper Space: Part 3 (超時空の大決戦・後編, Chō Jikū no Dai Kessen Kōhen)
16. ULTRA HIGH
17. The World Is Waiting for You (世界中が君を待っている, Sekai-jū ga Kimi o Matteiru)
18. I Want to Protect This Planet (この地球(ほし)を守りたい, Kono Hoshi o Mamoritai)
19. FIGHTING SOUL
20. No Matter How Strong (たとえ力が強くても, Tatoe Chikara ga Tsuyoku temo)
21. From the Land of Light Far Beyond (光の国からはるかに越えて, Hikari no Kuni kara Haruka ni Koete)
22. Here He Comes! Go Forth! Open the Gate of Time (きたぞ！すすめ！時のゲート開けて, Kita zo! Susume! Toki no Gēto o Akete)
23. Take Me Higher (もっと高く, Motto Takaku)
24. It's Time for Confrontation (向かい合う時が来た, Mukaiau Toki ga Kita)
25. To the Future That Awaits You (君の待つ未来へ, Kimi no Matsu Mirai e)

== Cast ==
- Ultraman Zero (ウルトラマンゼロ, Urutoraman Zero; Voice): Mamoru Miyano (宮野 真守, Miyano Mamoru)
- Ultraman Z (ウルトラマンゼット, Urutoraman Zetto; Voice; 18, 19): Tasuku Hatanaka (畠中 祐, Hanata Tasuku)
- Narrator: Katsumi Fukuhara (福原 かつみ, Fukuhara Katsumi)

== Theme song ==
- "Ultra Spiral"
  - Lyrics: TAKERU, Chiaki Seshimo (瀬下 千晶, Seshimo Chiaki)
  - Composition & Arrangement: Takao Konishi (小西 貴雄, Konishi Takao)
  - Artist: Voyager (ボイジャー, Boijā)
