= 24 Japan =

Japanese television drama

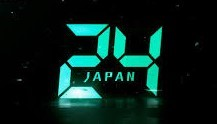
- Genre: Suspense; Serial drama; Political thriller; Action
- Created by: Joel Surnow; Robert Cochran
- Written by: Shūkei Nagasaka
- Starring: Toshiaki Karasawa Tae Kimura Hiyori Sakurada Yukie Nakama Michitaka Tsutsui; Yuki Imai; Maria Mori; Kumi Mizuno; Chiaki Kuriyama; Hiroyuki Ikeuchi; Aki Asakura; Yuki Tokito; Hiroaki Murakami; Shirō Sano; Shuhei Uesugi; Atsuhiro Inukai; Miki Yanagi; Yu Kamio; Kazuya Takahashi; Nana Katase; Yasuyuki Maekawa; Denden; Toshiki Ayata; Atsuko Sakurai; Haruka Uchimura; Yoshihisa Amano
- Composer: Yuki Nara
- Country of origin: Japan
- Original language: Japanese
- No. of seasons: 1
- No. of episodes: 24

Production
- Production companies: Total Media Communication; 20th Century Fox Television

Original release
- Network: TV Asahi
- Release: 9 October 2020 – 26 March 2021

24 Japan (トゥエンティフォー・ジャパン, Tuentifō Japan, stylized as "24 JAPAN") is a Japanese action thriller television series airing on TV Asahi, based on the American series 24. It began airing from 9 October 2020 and continued through March 2021. It was created by Joel Surnow and Robert Cochran, written by Shūkei Nagasaka and produced by Total Media Communication and 20th Century Fox Television, also commemorates the 60th anniversary of TV Asahi.

The series focuses on Genba Shidō, who works for the Tokyo–based Counter Terrorist Unit, his family, and a plot to assassinate Urara Asakura, who is set to become the first female prime minister of Japan. Some viewers found that in general, the plot of 24 Japan moves more slowly than the fast-paced original series.

The Japanese version of 24 is the second adaptation of the show; following the Hindi-language adaptation of the show. 24 Japan follows a story line similar to the first season of the American series, but with up-to-date technology.

== Cast ==
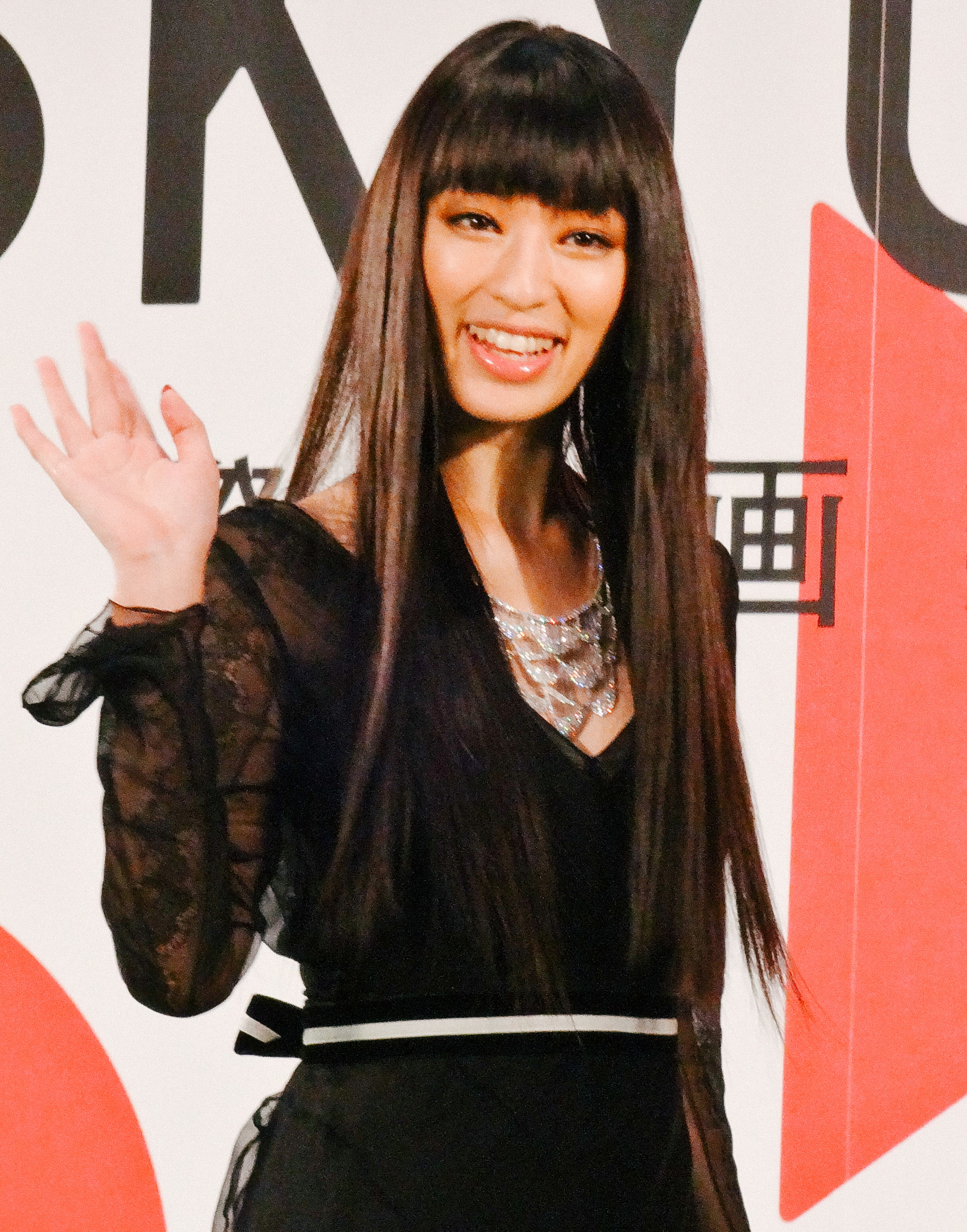
Kill Bill: Volume 1 star Chiaki Kuriyama takes on the role of Itsuki Mizuishi, a CTU agent based on the character Nina Myers.

- Toshiaki Karasawa as Genba Shidō, a character based on Jack Bauer, an agent from CTU Japan and serves as Chief of A Group, 1st Section, CTU (テロ対策ユニット第1支部A班). He is assigned to protect Urara Asakura, a veteran politician set to become Japan's first female prime minister.
- Tae Kimura as Rikka Shidō, Genba's wife, based on Teri Bauer
- Chiaki Kuriyama as Itsuki Mizuishi, a government agent at CTU based on the character Nina Myers.
- Hiyori Sakurada as Miyu Shidō, Genba and Rikka's teenage daughter, the character of Kim Bauer in the original series.
- Hiroyuki Ikeuchi as Takumi Nanjō, a government agent at CTU based on the character Tony Almeida.
- Yukie Nakama as Urara Asakura, the future first female prime minister of Japan, based on the character President David Palmer of the original show.
- Seiji Rokkaku as Banba Eiiji

== Production ==
According to TV Asahi producer Emii Kanda, 20th Century Fox, who owns the original rights, allowed the production of the show after four to five years of negotiations for its rights. The production of the show was allowed on the basis that 24 episodes would be presented in two seasons, a deviation from the typical release patterns of Japanese television dramas.

The series was produced by Total Media Communication for TV Asahi and was written by Shūkei Nagasaka. During the show's production, localization issues, such as the use of guns by non-police agencies in Japan and the change in family dynamics presented by the family of Urara Asakura were focused heavily on by TV Asahi and 20th Century. The producers were aware that, although the original series was enjoyed widely in Japan, adapting the story to a Japanese setting would be critiqued.

== Impact and reaction ==
Prior to the release of 24 Japan, doubts were expressed by the viewing public about the potential of a Japanese take on the concept of 24. A commonly expressed concern mentioned by one reviewer was that the type of gun-related violence and terrorism portrayed in the American series would not be realistic in a Japanese setting, since a major terror attack had not occurred in Japan since the Tokyo subway sarin attack on 20 March 1995. There was also concern that Karasawa was not the best choice to fill the role of Genba Shidō due to the age difference between him and Kiefer Sutherland at the onset of 24 in 2001 (Karasawa was 57 at time of filming; Sutherland was 34 when he started on 24).
