= Tatsuomi Hamada =

Japanese actor (born 2000)

- 濱田龍臣
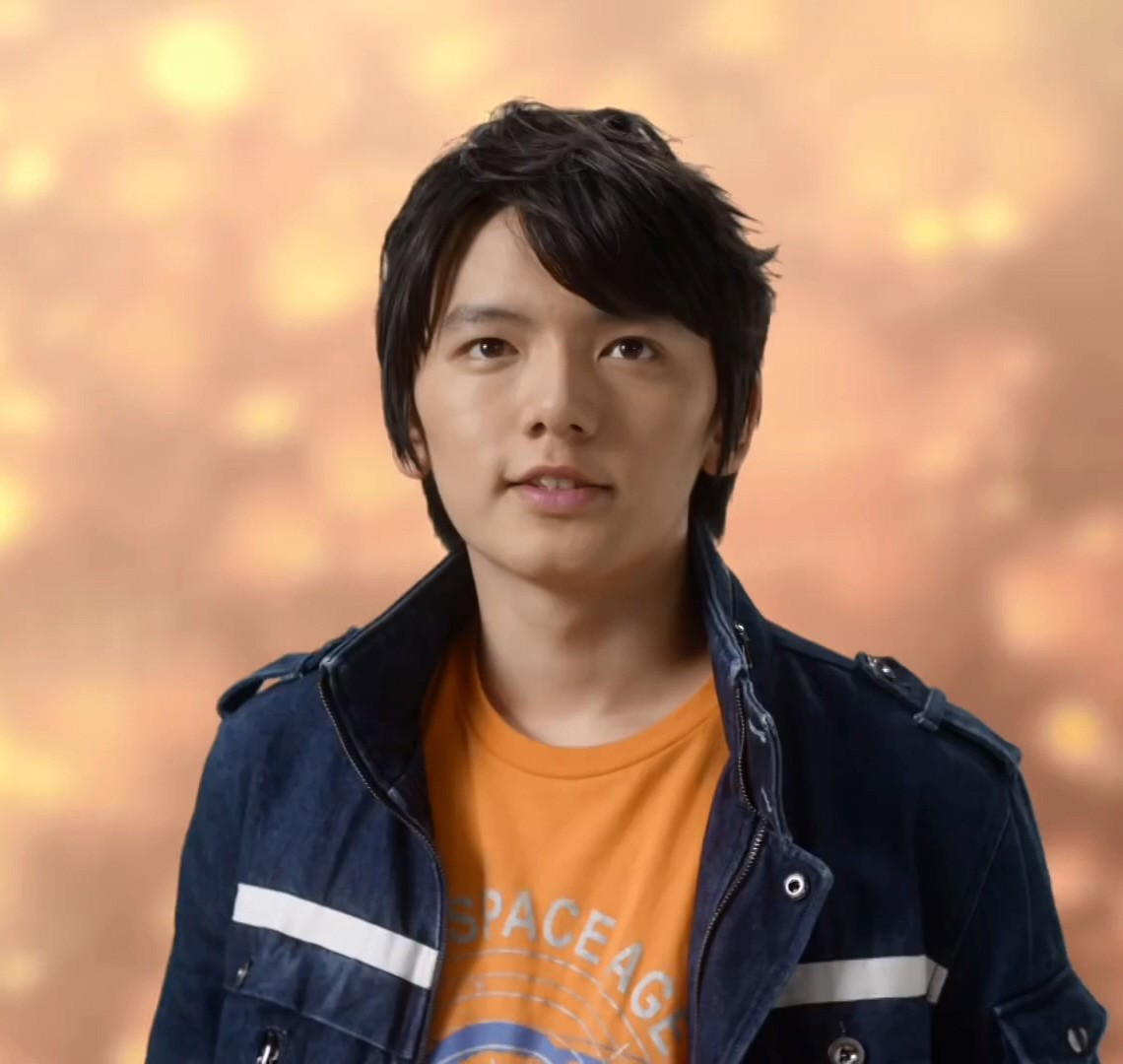
- Hamada in Ultraman Geed
- Born: August 27, 2000 (age 25); Chiba Prefecture, Japan
- Occupation: Actor
- Years active: 2006–present
- Agents: TakeOff; Four Springs
- Known for: Ryōmaden; Ultraman Geed; Kaibutsu-kun
- Awards: 3rd Gold Dream Award

Tatsuomi Hamada (濱田 龍臣, Hamada Tatsuomi; born August 27, 2000) is a Japanese actor represented by TakeOff and Four Springs.

As a child actor, Hamada played the role of Sakamoto Ryōma as a child in Ryōmaden and Hiroshi Ichikawa in Kaibutsu-kun. He won the 2010 Gold Dream Award in October 2010.

== Biography ==
Hamada was born in Chiba Prefecture. His hobbies and skills are playing soccer, collecting Lego, playing shogi and kendama, and impersonating Gachapin. Hamada likes tuna, according to a May 5, 2011 appearance in Hanamaru Market. He likes to study Chinese kanji. He can write difficult words such as "Uttōshī" and "Gōhōrairaku". In late August 2011, Hamada appeared with Masaharu Fukuyama in a Dunlop advertisement. They both played the role of Sakamoto Ryōma in Ryōmaden. He has a younger brother who is one year younger than him.

== Filmography ==
=== TV series ===
Year	Title	Role	Notes	Ref(s)
2010	Ryōmaden	Sakamoto Ryōma (child)	Taiga drama	
2010	The Monster Kid	Hiroshi Ichikawa		
2015	Dakara Kōya	Yuta Morimura		
2017	Ultraman Geed	Riku Asakura	Lead role	
2018	Mob Psycho 100	Shigeo "Mob" Kageyama	Lead role	
2018	Boys Over Flowers Season 2	Kaito Taira		
2019	Ultraman New Generation Chronicle	Riku Asakura		
2019	Ultra Galaxy Fight: New Generation Heroes	Ultraman Geed	Online miniseries	
2020	Ultraman Chronicle Zero & Geed	Riku Asakura		
2020	Ultraman Z	Riku Asakura		
2022	Invisible	Kaito Inami	Episode 2	
2023	Ranman	Kotetsu Yamamoto	Asadora	
2024	Tanabata no Kuni			
2026	Brothers in Arms	Saitō Tatsuoki	Taiga drama	
2026	Water Margin	Shi Xiu		

=== Films ===
Year	Title	Role	Notes	Ref(s)
2018	Ultraman Geed the Movie	Riku Asakura	Lead role	
2019	Hit Me Anyone One More Time	Atsuhiko Kuroda		
2019	Ultraman R/B the Movie	Riku Asakura		
2020	The Memory Eraser	Kaname		
2020	Ultraman Taiga The Movie	Riku Asakura		
2021	Brave: Gunjō Senki	Manjirō Yoshimoto		
2021	Honey Lemon Soda	Tomoya Takamine		
2021	Gunkan Shōnen	Jun		
2023	Baby Assassins: 2 Babies	Makoto		
2025	Perfect Shared House	Kento Sano	Lead role	
2025	Seishun Gestalt Houkai	Yūri Mamiya		
2025	The Last Man: The Movie – First Love	Hiromi Minami (young)		
