= Awa-Shirahama Bus Terminal =

Bus station in Minamibōsō, Japan

Awa-Shirahama Bus Terminal 安房白浜駅
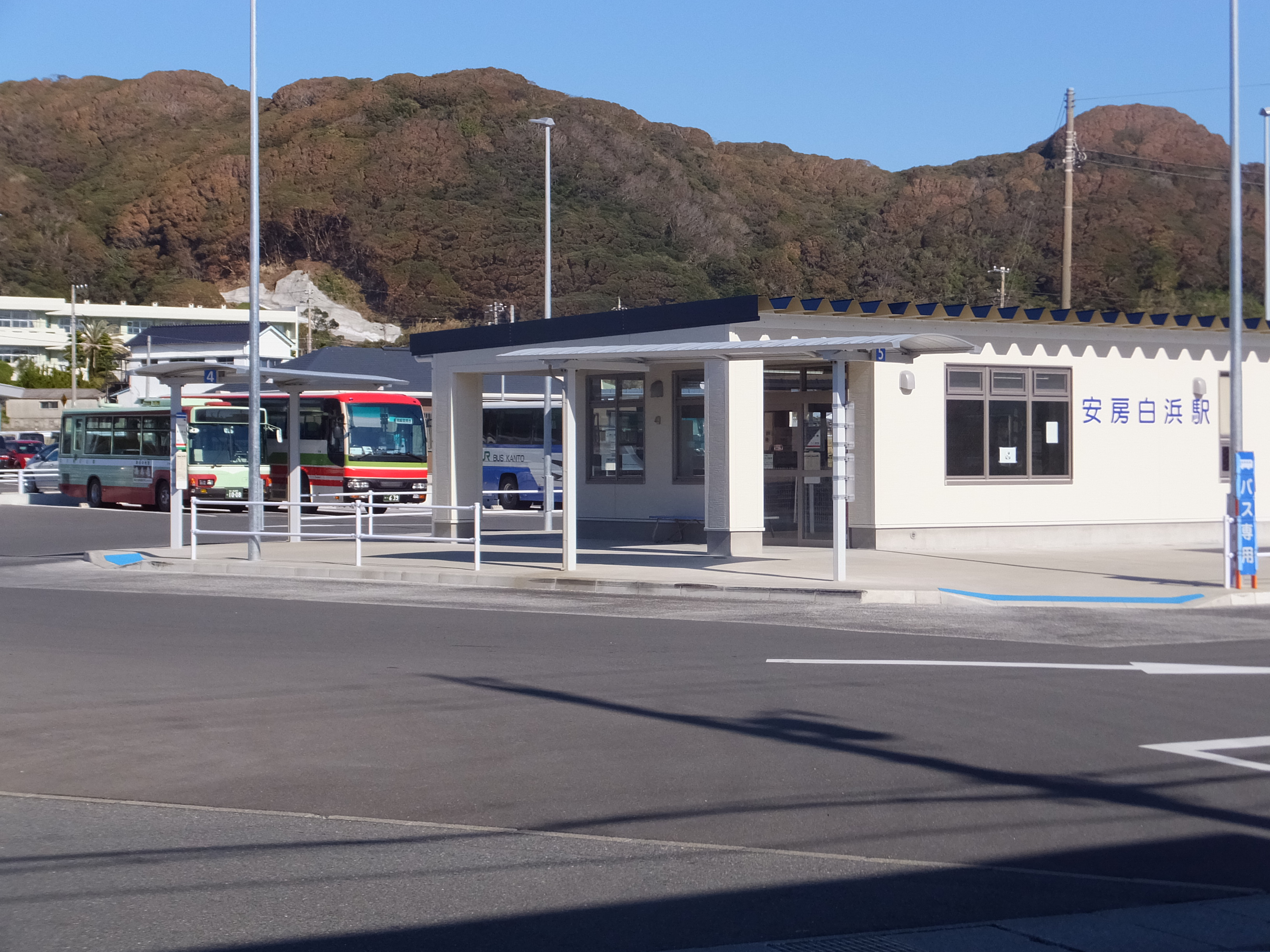
- Entrance of Awa-Shirahama Bus Terminal

General information
- Location: 1735-2 Shirahama, Shirahama, Minamibōsō, Chiba Prefecture (千葉県南房総市白浜町白浜); Japan
- Coordinates: 34.908770°N 139.889398°E,

Other information
- Website: official website

History
- Opened: 20 January 1933
Location
- Location within Chiba Prefecture Location within Japan

Awa-Shirahama Bus Terminal (安房白浜駅, Awa-Shirahama-eki) is a bus terminal at Minamibōsō in Japan. The bus terminal is used by JR Bus and Nitto Kotsu.

== History ==
In 2017, a new building was opened. The bus terminal is situated near Nojimazaki Lighthouse and Shirahama Onsen.

Two routes connect Tateyama Station and Tokyo Station) operated by JR Bus Kanto; four routes bound that connect Awa-Kamogawa Station or Chiba Station and operated by Nitto Kotsu.

== Facilities ==
Ticket selling for Highway Bus Boso Nanohana is operated by JR Bus and various commutation tickets and the book of coupon tickets that can be used to a lot of sections and route buses around Tateyama.

== Bus routes ==
- IC cards are not accepted on any bus route.

No	Name	Via	Terminal	Company	Note
1	Shirahama-Tateyama Line	Chikura Station	Awa-Kamogawa Station	Nitto Kotsu	
2					Track 2 is exclusively used for the purpose of getting off.
3	Minami Boshu Main Line	Awa Shizenmura	Tateyama Station (Chiba)	JR Bus Kanto	Passengers who have Japan Rail Pass ride on the bus route at free.
3	Expressway bus Boso Nanohana	Awa Shizenmura・Tateyama Station (Chiba)	Tokyo Station	JR Bus Kanto	The bus routes stop at all bus stops on Minamiboshu Main Line through Tateyama Station. The bus routes are changed to Expressway bus from Tateyama Station. Passengers who have Japan Rail Pass ride on this bus route at free between this terminal and Tateyama Station.
3	Toyofusa Line	Toyofusa	Tateyama Station (Chiba)	Nitto Kotsu	
4	Expressway bus Nanohana/ Shinjuku Nanohana	Kazusa-Minato Station	Tokyo Station or Shinjuku Station	Nitto Kotsu/JR Bus Kanto	
5	Expressway bus Nanso Satomi	Soga Station/Chiba Station	Chiba-Minato Station	Nitto Kotsu/ Chiba City Bus	

== Surrounding areas ==
There is Nojimazaki Lighthouse, it takes 10 minutes on foot from the bus terminal.
