= Kokonoe =

Kokonoe may refer to:

== People with the given name ==
- Yumiko Kokonoe (九重 佑三子, born 1946), Japanese actress and singer
- Chiyotaikai Ryūji, head coach of the stable, known as Kokonoe Oyakata

== Fictional characters ==
- Kokonoe, a fictional character from BlazBlue
- Rin Kokonoe, a fictional character from Kodomo no Jikan

== Places ==
- Kokonoe Station, is a passenger railway station
- Kokonoe, Ōita, a town in Ōita Prefecture, Japan
- Kokonoe stable, a stable of sumo wrestlers
