= Nakofunakata Station =

Railway station in Tateyama, Chiba Prefecture, Japan

Nakofunakata Station 那古船形駅
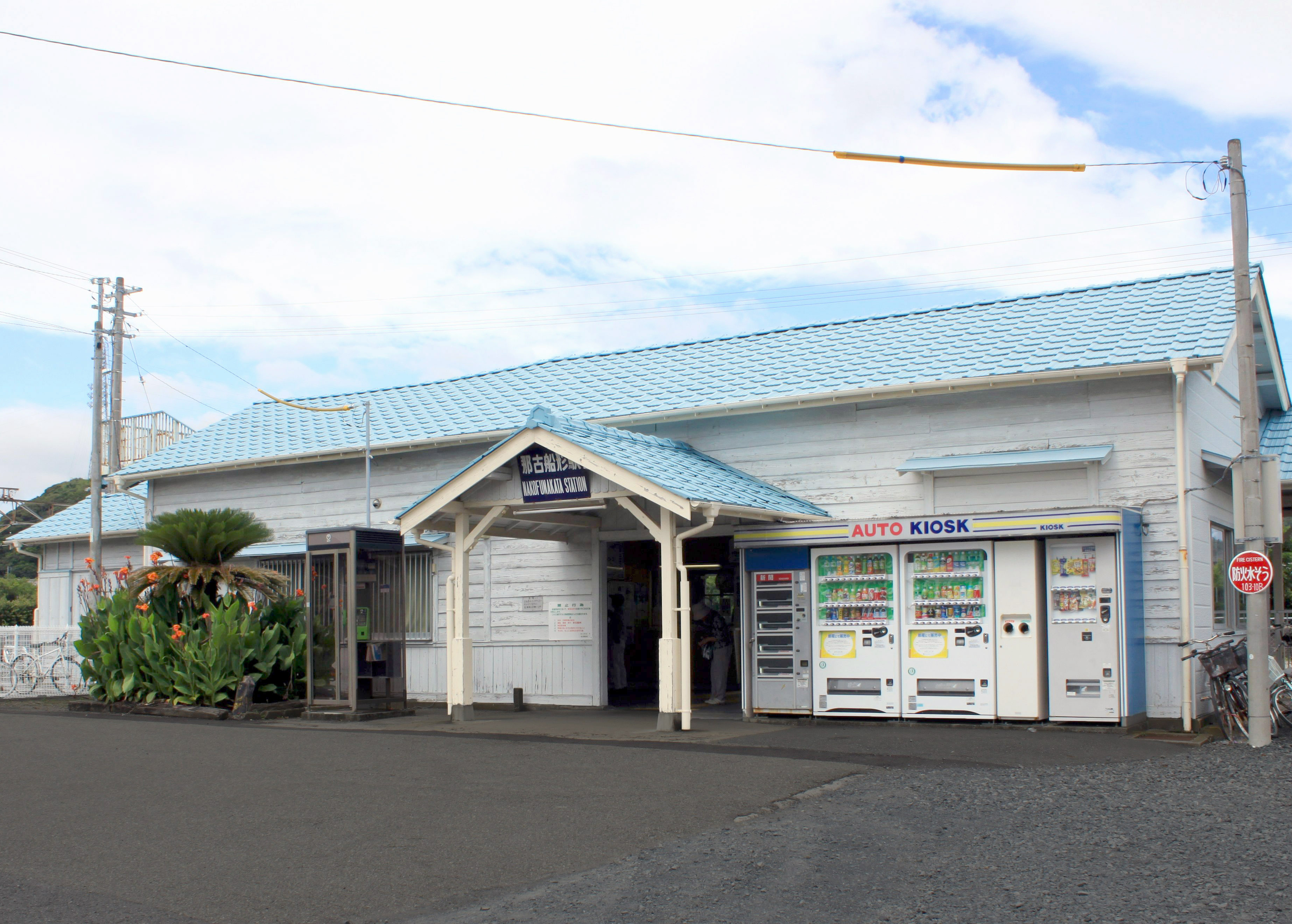
- Nakofunakata Station in July 2011

General information
- Location: Funagata 227, Tateyama-shi, Chiba-ken 294-0056; Japan
- Coordinates: 35.0288°N 139.8516°E
- Operator: JR East
- Line: ■ Uchibō Line
- Distance: 82.1 km from Soga
- Platforms: 1island platform
- Connections: Bus stop

Other information
- Status: Unstaffed
- Website: Official website

History
- Opened: August 10, 1918

Passengers
- FY2017: 175

Services
Preceding station	JR East	Following station
Tomiura towards Soga or Chiba	Uchibō Line Local	Tateyama towards Awa-Kamogawa
Location
- Location within Chiba Prefecture Location within Japan

Nakofunakata Station (那古船形駅, Nakofunakata-eki) is a passenger railway station in the city of Tateyama, Chiba Prefecture, Japan, operated by the East Japan Railway Company (JR East).

== Lines ==
Nakofunakata Station is served by the Uchibo Line, and is located 82.1 km from the starting point of the line at Soga Station.

== Station layout ==
The station consists of a single island platform serving two tracks. The wooden station building dates from 1918. The station is unattended.

=== Platforms ===
1	■ Uchibō Line	For Tateyama, Kimitsu, Kisarazu, Chiba
2	■ Uchibō Line	For Awa-Kamogawa

== History ==
Nakofunakata Station was opened on August 10, 1918. The station was absorbed into the JR East network upon the privatization of the Japan National Railways (JNR) on April 1, 1987.

== Passenger statistics ==
In the fiscal year 2017, the station was used by an average of 175 passengers daily (boarding passengers only).

== Surrounding area ==
- Tateyama Funakata Post Office
- Tateyama Nako Post Office
- Nago-dera
- Funakata Municipal Elementary School
- Daifuku-ji
- Nako Fishing Port
- National Route 127

== See also ==
- List of railway stations in Japan
