= Daifuku (disambiguation) =

Daifuku is a Japanese confection.

Daifuku may also refer to:

- Daifuku (company), a Japanese material-handling equipment company
- Daifuku Station, a train station in Sakurai, Nara Prefecture, Japan
- Daifuku-ji, a Buddhist temple located in Tateyama, Chiba Prefecture, Japan
- Daifukuji Soto Zen Mission, a Zen Buddhist temple on the island of Hawaii
- Daifuku, from Wonderful PreCure!
