= Nambo =

Nambo may be,

- Nambo language, a Papuan language
- Nambo railway station, Indonesia
- Nambo Paradise Botanical Garden, Japan
