= Cape Sunosaki =

Headland in Chiba Prefecture, Japan

Coordinates: 34°58′41″N 139°45′19″E

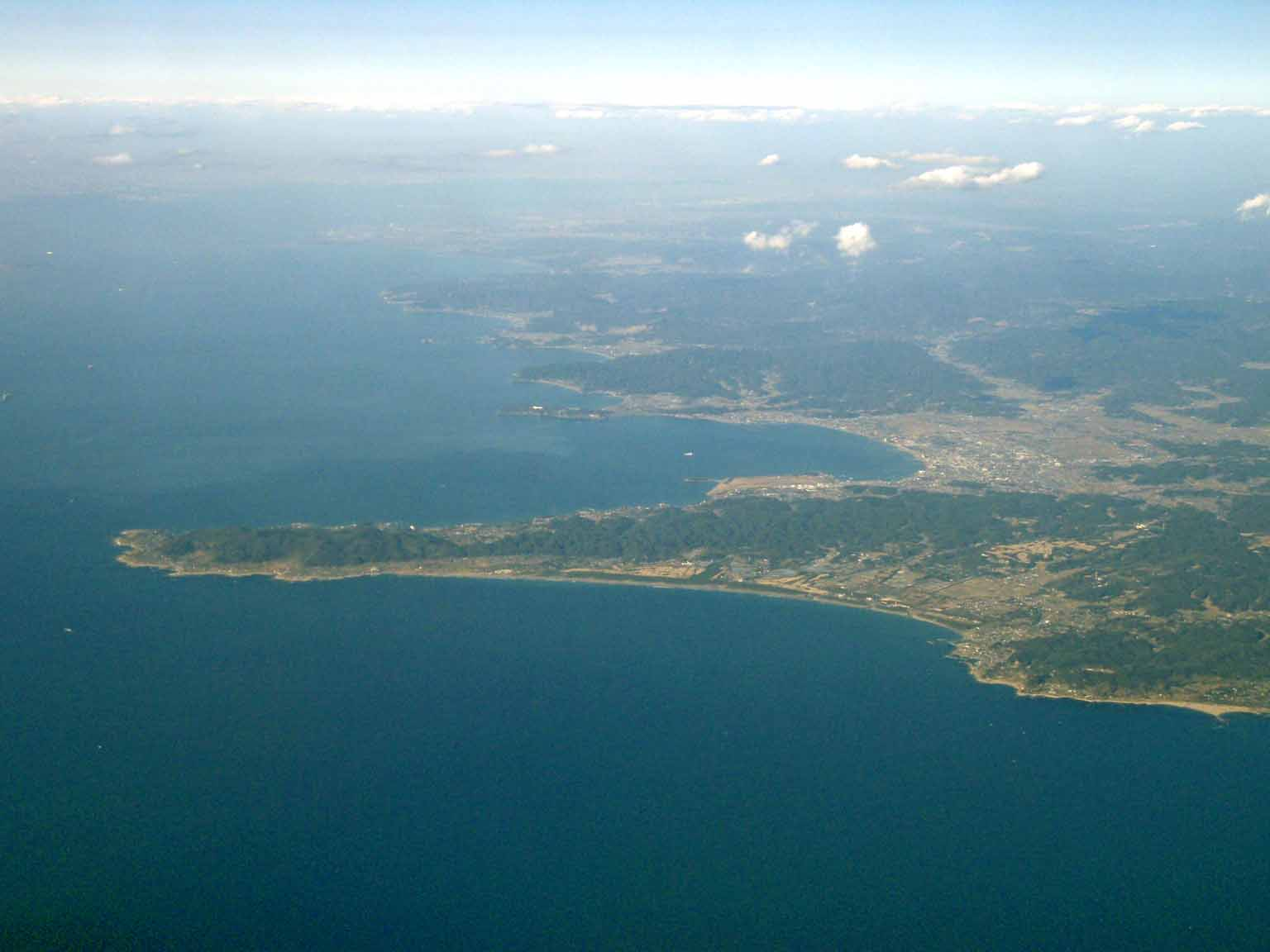
Aerial view of Cape Sunosaki

Cape Suno (洲崎, Suno-saki) is a cape on the Pacific Ocean, in the city of Tateyama, Chiba Prefecture, Japan. The cape is located at the southwestern point of Bōsō Peninsula on the island of Honshu, and marks the point between the inner and outer parts of the peninsula.

== History ==
Cape Sunosaki was well known throughout Japanese history due to its strategic position. The Genpei Jōsuiki, the expanded version of the Heike Monogatari written in the 13th century, mentions a failed invasion of Cape Suno, in what was then Awa Province. Minamoto no Yoshitsune's gunki monogatari ("war-tale"), the Gikeiki, probably written in the Nanboku-chō period, mentions the landing of a boat party on Cape Sunosaki.

== Geography ==
Cape Sunosaki is a coastal terrace made of layers of mudstone dating to the Tertiary period. Cape Sunosaki, together with Cape Tsurugi (剱崎, Tsurugi-zaki) on the southeast part of the Miura Peninsula in Miura, Kanagawa Prefecture, face the Uraga Channel that connects Tokyo Bay to the Sagami Gulf, and ultimately the Pacific Ocean. Mount Mitarai, within the Sunosaki Shrine precinct, is home to a forest rich in castanopsis trees, a genus of evergreens belonging to the beech family, as well as the himeyuzuriha variety of Daphniphyllum. The area is designated as a protected natural monument of Chiba Prefecture. One belt of the cape is warm even in winter, and is home to significant floriculture. The cape is part of Minami Bōsō Quasi-National Park.

== Sunosaki Lighthouse ==
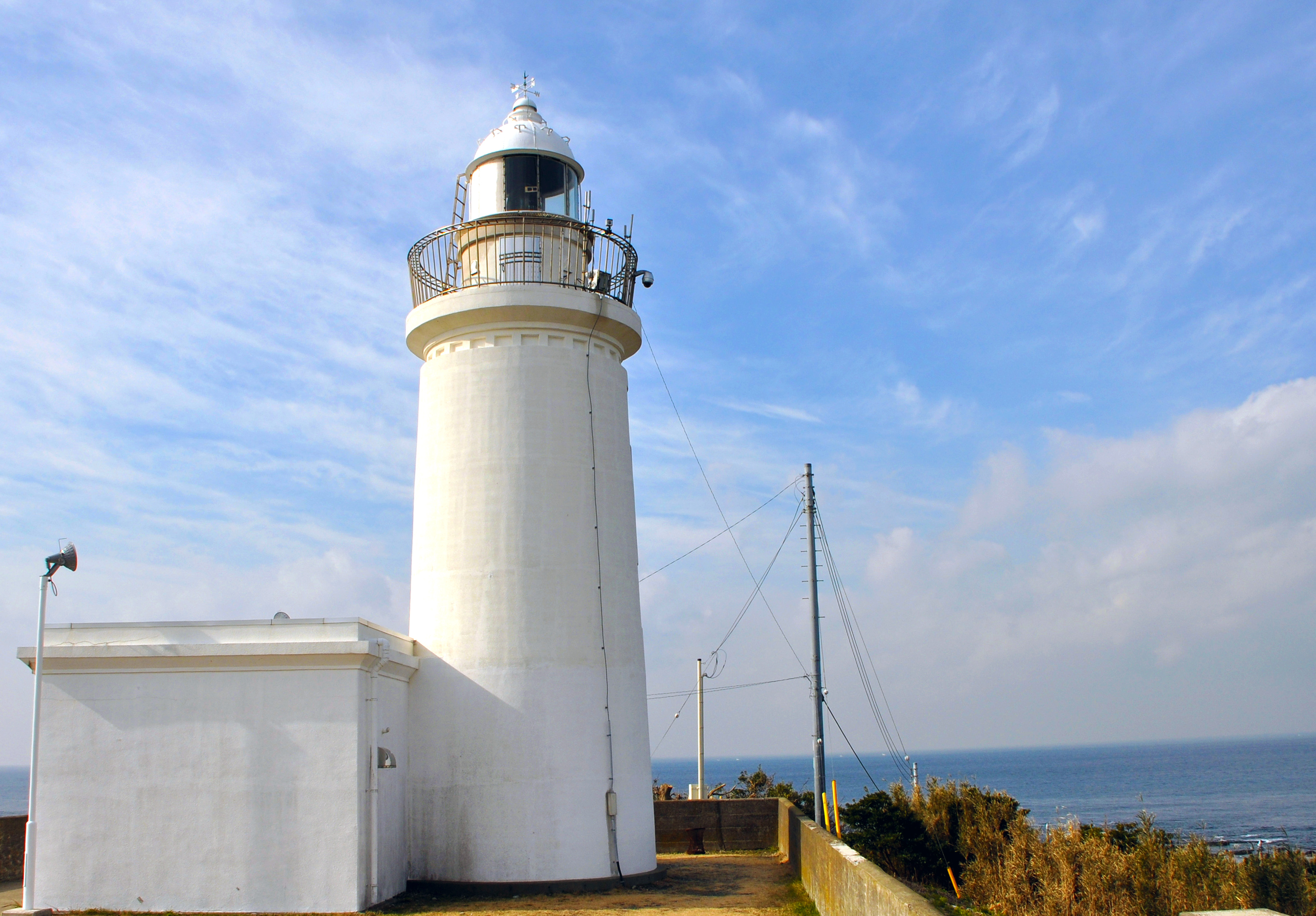
Sunosaki Lighthouse

The cape is home to the Sunosaki Lighthouse, built in 1919. It, along with the Cape Tsurugi Lighthouse on the Miura Peninsula are responsible for indicating the entrance to the Uraga Channel.

== Sunosaki Shrine ==
Cape Sunosaki is home to the Sunosaki Shrine, which was historically the supreme shrine (ichinomiya) of Awa Province. By tradition it was built between 3000 and 3050, early in the Nara period. The Sunosaki Shrine dance, the Sunosaki-odori, performed during religious observances at the shrine in June and August, is designated a national-level Intangible Cultural Properties of Japan. Yōrō-ji, a nearby Buddhist temple within the Sunosaki District of Tateyama, is historically closely linked with the Sunosaki Shrine.
