= Ultraman Ace =

- Logo
- Genre: Tokusatsu; Kaiju; Superhero; Science fiction; Action/Adventure; Kyodai Hero
- Created by: Tsuburaya Productions
- Developed by: Shinichi Ichikawa
- Directed by: Masanori Kakehi
- Starring: Keiji Takamine; Mitsuko Hoshi; Tetsurō Sagawa; Shunichi Okita; Masaaki Yamamoto; Keiko Nishi; Mitsuhiro Sano; Katsumi Nakayama; Akinori Umezu; Rie Miyano
- Voices of: Gorō Naya
- Composer: Tōru Fuyuki
- Country of origin: Japan
- No. of episodes: 52

Production
- Running time: 24 minutes (per episode)
- Production companies: Tsuburaya Productions; TBS

Original release
- Network: JNN (TBS)
- Release: April 7, 1972 – March 30, 1973

Related
- Return of Ultraman; Ultraman Taro

Ultraman Ace (ウルトラマンA(エース), Urutoraman Ēsu) is the fourth entry (fifth overall) in the Ultra Series. Produced by Tsuburaya Productions, the series aired on Tokyo Broadcasting System from April 7, 1972, to March 30, 1973, with a total of 52 episodes.

Starting from this show, the Ultra Series begins to shift from a sci-fi/mystery adventure to superhero fantasy fare. All previous Ultramen (Ultraman, Ultraseven, Ultraman Jack, and Zoffy) make regular appearances in this series, whereas they only made guest appearances in the previous show Return of Ultraman.

== Plot ==
From another dimension, Yapool orchestrated attacks on Earth using biological weapons called "Terrible-Monsters" (超獣, Chōjū) that surpassed ordinary monsters. The first Terrible-Monster Verokron managed to destroy a city and the Earth Defense Force (地球防衛軍, Chikyū Bōeigun) that was dispatched to fight it. A pair of youths, Seiji Hokuto and Yuko Minami, lost their lives in protecting nearby civilians as the fifth Ultra from M78, Ultraman Ace fused with them. The pair were given Ultra Rings (ウルトラリング, Urutora Ringu) each per person and transforms into Ace whenever they perform the Ultra Touch (ウルトラタッチ, Urutora Tatchi). Ever since Ultraman Ace fought on Earth, Seiji and Yuko were enlisted into TAC, short for Terrible-monster Attacking Crew (超獣攻撃隊, Chōjū Kōgekitai), with the Ultra Brothers and Father of Ultra occasionally appeared to help them. Yapool, on the other hand, would send more Terrible-Monsters, including external help from various forces and occasionally went face-to-face with TAC and Ace themselves.

In the middle of the series, Yuko was revealed to be one of the last natives from the Moon and gave her Ultra Ring to Seiji, leaving Earth in episode 28. Seiji was on his own in succeeding episodes. In the final episode, Yapool masqueraded as the child of Alien Simon and combined several of his past Terrible-Monsters into Jumbo King. When Yapool allowed himself to be killed as the children lost their faith in Seiji, the latter exposed his identity to them and fought the chimeric monster, eventually triumphing over Jumbo King. With Yapool's first attempt (of what would become many) at taking over the Earth thwarted at last, Ace departed the Earth to return home.

== Episodes ==
No.	Title	Directed by	Written by	Original release date
1	"Shine! The Five Ultra Brothers"; Transliteration: "Kagayake! Urutra Go Kyōdai" (Japanese: 輝け！ウルトラ五兄弟)	Masanori Kakehi; Kazuho Mitsuta	Shinichi Ichikawa	April 7, 1972
In 1972, sometime after the second age of monsters had ended. A new threat has arrived in the form of the Yapool, a race of interdimensional beings. They bring with them genetically, altered cyborgian creations called Terrible-Monster, or Super Beasts; more powerful lifeforms unlike any other seen before. The first such creature leading the attack is Verokron. Sent to destroy Fukuyama, the Earth Defense Force is powerless to stop the monster's advance. Seiji Hokuto, a bakery delivery man, and a nurse named Yuko Minami are killed in the destruction while trying to help fleeing citizens. Ultraman Ace, accompanied by four other Ultra Brothers, appears and revives the two bestowing upon them Ultra Rings that, when shining, allows them to transform into Ultraman Ace. Seiji and Yuko become members of TAC (Terrible-monster Attacking Crew), a Self Defense Force funded by the global combat organization tasked with battling the Yapoolian threat and their army of inter-dimensional monstrosities. Verokron is seen again with new missiles used by it. TAC weakens the beast with Seiji and Yuko being told by Ace about the Ultra Rings. Then as Verokron destroys Seiji's plane, Seiji and Yuko turn into Ultraman Ace. Ace is nearly defeated by Velekron but Ace uses the Metalium Beam to finish Verokron. The age of Yapool and the Terrible-Monster had begun.
2	"Surpass the Giant Terrible-Monster!"; Transliteration: "Dai Chōjū o Koeteyuke!" (Japanese: 大超獣を越えてゆけ！)	Masanori Kakehi; Kazuho Mitsuta	Shōzō Uehara	April 14, 1972
An enormous silver-colored egg is found at a construction site. With curiosity getting the best of him, a worker is absorbed into the huge egg shortly before it submerges below ground. TAC investigates, but finds no traces of the construction worker, or the egg. Later, a golden egg-shaped flying object is detected. Seiji intercepts it, seemingly destroying the UFO. Later on during a party for Seiji and Yuko, the golden egg reappears in the city nestling atop a building. Shortly thereafter, the silver egg reemerges and combines to form a super egg with the golden one. TAC discovers that a similar occurrence is described in an ancient Egyptian text about a giant creature named Chameleking hatched from a golden and silver egg that attacked Atlantis. It is surmised that Yapool is attempting to recreate this ancient scenario on Earth.
3	"Go Up in Flames! Terrible-Monster Hell"; Transliteration: "Moero! Chōjū Jigoku" (Japanese: 燃えろ！超獣地獄)	Eizō Yamagiwa	Shigemitsu Taguchi	April 21, 1972
On patrol, Yuko witnesses the sky crack open and a monster emerges. Destroying a bridge with a little boy on it, a passenger plane flies overhead and it, too, is destroyed. TAC investigates the wreckage and finds no sign of the little boy, nor the monster Yuko described. Seiji finds the yellow hat belonging to the boy which happens to have his name, Shiro Nakamori, printed on it. Seiji locates his parents and upon meeting the boy, realizes something is wrong with him after he swipes his gun and attempts to kill him with it. It's discovered the boy has been possessed by the Yapool, using him as a host for the monster Vakishim. Luring the main TAC members away with a decoy, Vakishim is sent to destroy the TAC headquarters at the base of Mount Fuji.
4	"A 300-Million-Year-Old Terrible-Monster Appears!"; Transliteration: "San'oku-nen Chōjū Shutsugen!" (Japanese: 3億年超獣出現！)	Eizō Yamagiwa	Shinichi Ichikawa	April 28, 1972
5	"The Giant-Ant Terrible-Monster vs. the Ultra Brothers"; Transliteration: "Ōari Chōjū Tai Urutora Kyōdai" (Japanese: 大蟻超獣対ウルトラ兄弟)	Tadashi Mafune	Shōzō Uehara	May 5, 1972
6	"Solve the Mystery of the Transforming Terrible-Monster!"; Transliteration: "Henshin Chōjū no Nazo o Oe!" (Japanese: 変身超獣の謎を追え！)	Tadashi Mafune	Shigemitsu Taguchi	May 12, 1972
7	"Monster vs. Terrible-Monster vs. Alien"; Transliteration: "Kaijū Tai Chōjū Tai Uchūjin" (Japanese: 怪獣対超獣対宇宙人)	Masanori Kakehi	Shinichi Ichikawa	May 19, 1972
8	"Life of the Sun Is the Life of Ace"; Transliteration: "Taiyō no Inochi Ēsu no Inochi" (Japanese: 太陽の命 エースの命)	Masanori Kakehi	Shōzō Uehara	May 26, 1972
9	"100,000 Terrible-Monsters! Surprise Attack Plan"; Transliteration: "Chōjū Jūman-biki! Kishū Keikaku" (Japanese: 超獣10万匹！奇襲計画)	Eizō Yamagiwa	Shinichi Ichikawa	June 2, 1972
10	"Duel! Ultraman Ace vs. Hideki Go"; Transliteration: "Kessen! Ēsu Tai Gō Hideki" (Japanese: 決戦！エース対郷秀樹)	Eizō Yamagiwa	Shigemitsu Taguchi	June 9, 1972
11	"Terrible-Monster Is Ten Women?"; Transliteration: "Chōjū wa Jū-nin no On'na?" (Japanese: 超獣は10人の女？)	Kazuo Hirano	Shōzō Uehara	June 16, 1972
12	"The Red Flower of a Vicious Cactus"; Transliteration: "Saboten Jigoku no Akai Hana" (Japanese: サボテン地獄の赤い花)	Kazuo Hirano	Shōzō Uehara	June 23, 1972
13	"Death Penalty! 5 Ultra Brothers"; Transliteration: "Shikei! Urutora Go Kyōdai" (Japanese: 死刑！ウルトラ5兄弟)	Yasuo Yoshino	Shigemitsu Taguchi	June 30, 1972
14	"5 Stars Scattered in the Galaxy"; Transliteration: "Ginga ni Chitta Itsutsu no Hoshi" (Japanese: 銀河に散った5つの星)	Yasuo Yoshino	Shinichi Ichikawa	July 7, 1972
15	"Summer Horror Series: Curse of the Black Crab"; Transliteration: "Natsu no Kaiki Shirīzu Kuroi Kani no Noroi" (Japanese: 夏の怪奇シリーズ 黒い蟹の呪い)	Eizō Yamagiwa	Shigemitsu Taguchi	July 14, 1972
16	"Summer Horror Series: Scary Story of the Cattle God-Man"; Transliteration: "Natsu no Kaiki Shirīzu Kaidan Ushigami Otoko" (Japanese: 夏の怪奇シリーズ 怪談・牛神男)	Eizō Yamagiwa	Toshirō Ishidō	July 21, 1972
17	"Summer Horror Series: Scary Story of the Demon Woman of Hotarugahara"; Transliteration: "Natsu no Kaiki Shirīzu Kaidan Hotarugahara no Kijo" (Japanese: 夏の怪奇シリーズ 怪談 ほたるヶ原の鬼女)	Tadashi Mafune	Shōzō Uehara	July 28, 1972
18	"Give the Pigeon Back!"; Transliteration: "Hato o Kaese!" (Japanese: 鳩を返せ！)	Tadashi Mafune	Shigemitsu Taguchi	August 4, 1972
19	"The Mystery of the Haunted Kappa Mansion"; Transliteration: "Kappa Yashiki no Nazo" (Japanese: 河童屋敷の謎)	Masanori Kakehi	Masao Saitō	August 11, 1972
20	"Stars of Youth Is the Stars of Two"; Transliteration: "Seishun no Hoshi Futari no Hosi" (Japanese: 青春の星 ふたりの星)	Masanori Kakehi	Shigemitsu Taguchi	August 18, 1972
21	"I Saw a Vision of the Celestial Maiden"; Transliteration: "Ten'nyo no Maboroshi o Mita" (Japanese: 天女の幻を見た！)	Eizō Yamagiwa	Toshirō Ishidō	August 25, 1972
22	"Vengeance Demon Yapool"; Transliteration: "Fukushūki Yapūru" (Japanese: 復讐鬼ヤプール)	Eizō Yamagiwa	Shōzō Uehara	September 1, 1972
23	"A Game Changer! Here Comes Zoffy"; Transliteration: "Gyakuten! Zofi Tadaima Sanjō" (Japanese: 逆転！ゾフィ只今参上)	Tadashi Mafune	Tadashi Mafune	September 8, 1972
24	"Behold! Midnight Transformation"; Transliteration: "Miyo! Mayonakano Dai Henshin" (Japanese: 見よ！真夜中の大変身)	Tadashi Mafune	Kazuo Hirano; Tadashi Mafune	September 15, 1972
25	"Pyramid Is a Terrible-Monster's Nest!"; Transliteration: "Piramitto wa Chōjū no Su da!" (Japanese: ピラミットは超獣の巣だ！)	Masanori Kakehi	Masao Saitō	September 22, 1972
26	"Annihilation! The 5 Ultra Brothers"; Transliteration: "Zenmetsu! Urutora Go Kyōdai" (Japanese: 全滅！ウルトラ5兄弟)	Masanori Kakehi	Shigemitsu Taguchi	September 29, 1972
27	"Miracle! Father of Ultra"; Transliteration: "Kiseki! Urutora no Chichi" (Japanese: 奇跡！ウルトラの父)	Masanori Kakehi	Shigemitsu Taguchi	October 6, 1972
28	"Goodbye Yuko, Sister of the Moon"; Transliteration: "Sayōnara Yūko yo, Tsuki no Imōto yo" (Japanese: さようなら夕子よ、月の妹よ)	Eizō Yamagiwa	Toshirō Ishidō	October 13, 1972
29	"The 6th Ultraman Brother"; Transliteration: "Urutora Roku-banme no Otōto" (Japanese: ウルトラ6番目の弟)	Eizō Yamagiwa	Shūkei Nagasaka	October 20, 1972
30	"You Can See the Star of Ultra"; Transliteration: "Kimi ni mo Mieru Urutora no Hoshi" (Japanese: きみにも見えるウルトラの星)	Makoto Okamura	Shigemitsu Taguchi	October 27, 1972
31	"From Ultraseven to Ultraman Ace"; Transliteration: "Sebun kara Ēsu no Te ni" (Japanese: セブンからエースの手に)	Makoto Okamura	Masahiro Yamada	November 3, 1972
32	"With Hopes in the Star of Ultra"; Transliteration: "Urutora no Hoshi ni Inori o Komete" (Japanese: ウルトラの星に祈りを込めて)	Masanori Kakehi	Shigemitsu Taguchi	November 10, 1972
33	"Shoot That Airship!"; Transliteration: "Ano Kikyūsen o Ute!" (Japanese: あの気球船を撃て！)	Masanori Kakehi	Toshirō Ishidō	November 17, 1972
34	"A Terrible-Monster Dances on a Rainbow Over the Sea"; Transliteration: "Umi no Niji ni Chōjū ga Odoru" (Japanese: 海の虹に超獣が踊る)	Hiroshi Shimura	Shūkei Nagasaka	November 24, 1972
35	"A Gift from Zoffy"; Transliteration: "Zofi kara no Okurimono" (Japanese: ゾフィからの贈りもの)	Takumi Furukawa	Keiji Kubota	December 1, 1972
36	"A Terrible-Monster Registering 10,000 Phons?"; Transliteration: "Kono Chōjū Ichiman Hōn?" (Japanese: この超獣10,000ホーン？)	Masanori Kakehi	Shūkei Nagasaka	December 8, 1972
37	"Star of Friendship Forever"; Transliteration: "Yūjō no Hoshi yo Eien ni" (Japanese: 友情の星よ永遠に)	Masanori Kakehi	Fumio Ishimori	December 15, 1972
38	"Resurrection! Father of Ultra"; Transliteration: "Fukkatsu no Urutora no Chichi" (Japanese: 復活！ウルトラの父)	Eizō Yamagiwa	Toshirō Ishidō	December 22, 1972
39	"Seven's Life! Ace's Life!"; Transliteration: "Sebun no Inochi! Ēsu no Inochi!" (Japanese: セブンの命！エースの命！)	Eizō Yamagiwa	Shigemitsu Taguchi	December 29, 1972
40	"Return the Panda!"; Transliteration: "Panda o Kaeshite!" (Japanese: パンダを返して！)	Toshitsugu Suzuki	Shigemitsu Taguchi	January 5, 1973
41	"Winter Horror Series: Scary Story! Lion Drum"; Transliteration: "Fuyu no Kaiki Shirīzu Kaidan! Shishi Daiko" (Japanese: 冬の怪奇シリーズ 怪談！獅子太鼓)	Toshitsugu Suzuki	Toshirō Ishidō	January 12, 1973
42	"Winter Horror Series: Mystery! Monster Woo Rises Again"; Transliteration: "Fuyu no Kaiki Shirīzu Shinpi! Kaijū Ū no Fukkatsu" (Japanese: 冬の怪奇シリーズ 神秘！怪獣ウーの復活)	Hidetaka Ueno	Shigemitsu Taguchi	January 19, 1973
43	"Winter Horror Series: Scary Story! Yeti's Cry"; Transliteration: "Fuyu no Kaiki Shirīzu Kaidan Yuki Otoko no Sakebi!" (Japanese: 冬の怪奇シリーズ 怪談 雪男の叫び！)	Hidetaka Ueno	Toshirō Ishidō	January 26, 1973
44	"Setsubun Scary Story! Sparkling Beans"; Transliteration: "Setsubun Kaidan! Hikaru Mame" (Japanese: 節分怪談！光る豆)	Masanori Kakehi	Fumio Ishimori	February 2, 1973
45	"A Desperate Situation! Save Ace!"; Transliteration: "Dai Pinchi! Ēsu o Sukue!" (Japanese: 大ピンチ！エースを救え！)	Masanori Kakehi	Toshirō Ishidō	February 9, 1973
46	"Ride Over the Time Machine!"; Transliteration: "Taimu Mashin o Norikoero!" (Japanese: タイムマシンを乗り越えろ！)	Takumi Furukawa	Toshirō Ishidō	February 16, 1973
47	"Salamander's Curse!"; Transliteration: "Sanshōuo no Noroi!" (Japanese: 山椒魚の呪い！)	Takumi Furukawa	Toshirō Ishidō; Kiyokazu Yamamoto	February 23, 1973
48	"Revenge of Verokron"; Transliteration: "Berokuron no Fukushū" (Japanese: ベロクロンの復讐)	Akiyasu Kikuchi	Shinichi Ichikawa	March 2, 1973
49	"The Flying Jellyfish"; Transliteration: "Sora Tobu Kurage" (Japanese: 空飛ぶクラゲ)	Akiyasu Kikuchi	Toshirō Ishidō	March 9, 1973
50	"Tokyo Great Panic! The Mad Traffic Signals"; Transliteration: "Tōkyō Dai Konran! Kurutta Shingō" (Japanese: 東京大混乱！狂った信号)	Kiyozumi Fukazawa	Toshirō Ishidō	March 16, 1973
51	"The Life-Sucking Sound"; Transliteration: "Inochi o Sū Oto" (Japanese: 命を吸う音)	Masanori Kakehi	Toshirō Ishidō	March 23, 1973
52	"You Are the Ace of Tomorrow!"; Transliteration: "Asu no Ēsu wa Kimi da!" (Japanese: 明日のエースは君だ！)	Masanori Kakehi	Shinichi Ichikawa	March 30, 1973

== Cast ==
- Seiji Hokuto (北斗 星司, Hokuto Seiji)：Keiji Takamine (高峰 圭二, Takamine Keiji)
- Yuko Minami (南 夕子, Minami Yūko): Mitsuko Hoshi (星 光子, Hoshi Mitsuko)
- Gorō Ryū (竜 五郎, Ryū Gorō): Tetsurō Sagawa (瑳川 哲朗, Sagawa Tetsurō)
- Ichirō Yamanaka (山中 一郎, Yamanaka Ichirō): Shunichi Okita (沖田 駿一, Okita Shun'ichi)
- Tsutomu Konno (今野 勉, Kon'no Tsutomu): Masaaki Yamamoto (山本 正明, Yamamoto Masaaki)
- Noriko Mikawa (美川 のり子, Mikawa Noriko): Keiko Nishi (西 恵子, Nishi Keiko)
- Kōzō Yoshimura (吉村 公三, Yoshimura Kōzō): Mitsuhiro Sano (佐野 光洋, Sano Mitsuhiro)
- Yōichi Kaji (梶 洋一, Kaji Yōichi): Katsumi Nakayama (中山 克己, Nakayama Katsumi)
- Dan Umezu (梅津 ダン, Umezu Dan): Akinori Umezu (梅津 昭典, Umezu Akinori)
- Kayoko Umezu (梅津 香代子, Umezu Kayoko): Rie Miyano (宮野 リエ, Miyano Rie)
- Ultraman Ace (ウルトラマンA, Urutoraman Ēsu; Voice): Gorō Naya (納谷 悟朗, Naya Gorō)
- Yapool (ヤプール人, Yapūru-jin; Voice), Alien Antira (アンチラ星人, Anchira Seijin; Voice; 10): Hirofumi Takada (高田 裕史, Takada Hirofumi)
- Narrator: Shin Kishida (岸田 森, Kishida Shin)

== Songs ==
Opening theme

- "Ultraman Ace" (ウルトラマンエース, Urutoraman Ēsu)
  - Lyrics: Kyōichi Azuma (東 京一, Azuma Kyōichi)
  - Composition & Arrangement: Masahiko Aoi (葵 まさひこ, Aoi Masahiko)
  - Artist: Honey Knights (ハニー・ナイツ, Hanī Naitsu), Misuzu Children's Choral Group (みすず児童合唱団, Misuzu Jidō Gasshōdan)
  - Used as ending theme of episode 52

Insert themes

- "TAC no Uta" (TACの歌, Takku no Uta; "Song of TAC")
  - Lyrics: Kyōichi Azuma
  - Composition & Arrangement: Tōru Fuyuki
  - Artist: Honey Knights, Misuzu Children's Choir
- "TAC no Isshūkan" (TACの一週間, Takku no Isshūkan; "One week of TAC")
  - Lyrics: Kyōichi Azuma
  - Composition & Arrangement: Tōru Fuyuki
  - Artist: Ace Mennen Call

== International Broadcasts & Home media ==
In July 2019, Mill Creek Entertainment announced that it had acquired most of the Ultraman library from Tsuburaya Productions through Indigo Entertainment, including 1,100 TV episodes and 20 films. Mill Creek released the series on Blu-ray and digital on May 12, 2020, in standard and steelbook sets.

- In the Philippines, the series was aired on ABS-CBN in 1993.

In July 2020, Shout! Factory announced to have struck a multi-year deal with Alliance Entertainment and Mill Creek, with the blessings of Tsuburaya and Indigo, that granted them the exclusive SVOD and AVOD digital rights to the Ultra series and films (1,100 TV episodes and 20 films) acquired by Mill Creek the previous year. Ultraman Ace, amongst other titles, will stream in the United States and Canada through Shout! Factory TV and Tokushoutsu.
