= Golgo 13: The Professional =

1983 Japanese anime film by Osamu Dezaki

- Japanese theatrical poster

Japanese name
- Kanji: ゴルゴ13
Transcriptions
- Revised Hepburn: Gorugo Sātīn
- Directed by: Osamu Dezaki
- Screenplay by: Shūkei Nagasaka
- Based on: Golgo 13 by Takao Saito
- Produced by: Nobuo Inada
- Starring: Tetsurō Sagawa; Gorô Naya; Toshiko Fujita; Kōsei Tomita; Kiyoshi Kobayashi; Reiko Mutō
- Cinematography: Hirokata Takahashi
- Edited by: Masatoshi Tsurubuchi
- Music by: Toshiyuki Kimori
- Production companies: Tokyo Movie Shinsha; Filmlink International
- Distributed by: Toho-Towa
- Release date: 28 May 1983
- Running time: 93 minutes
- Country: Japan
- Language: Japanese

Golgo 13: The Professional, known as simply Golgo 13 (ゴルゴ13) in Japan, is a 1983 Japanese animated action film based on the manga series Golgo 13 by Takao Saito. The film was directed by Osamu Dezaki, produced by Yutaka Fujioka and Mata Yamamoto and was written from a screenplay by Shūkei Nagasaka, a tokusatsu writer best known for writing episodes for Android Kikaider and Kamen Rider X. It is the first animated film based on the manga, and the third overall Golgo 13 film after two previous live-action films (the second film starring Sonny Chiba as Golgo 13).

Upon its original Japanese theatrical release, Golgo 13: The Professional was the first feature-length animated film to incorporate CGI animation, used in a helicopter action sequence as well as the opening credits. The film was later released in North America by Streamline Pictures in 1992. The Streamline release received mixed reviews from American critics at the time, with praise for the animation design, dubbing and music but criticism towards the story, violence and bleak tone.

== Plot ==
In Santa Catalina Island, California, professional hitman Golgo 13 is hired to assassinate Robert Dawson, the son of oil baron Leonard Dawson and the heir of Dawson Enterprises. He succeeds in doing so. A few days later, Golgo is hired to kill Dr. Z, a shadowy crime boss who rules over the Sicilian mafia. After travelling to Messina and infiltrating Dr. Z's organization and seducing his daughter Cindy, Golgo survives an ambush from Dr. Z's henchmen. He calls Cindy to tell her he figured out that she is actually Dr. Z, then later intercepts her at a beach and kills her. Golgo then escapes ambushes by U.S. Special Forces Lieutenant Bob Bragan and three CIA operatives. One of Golgo's contacts, a clockmaker, is murdered by a genetically enhanced supersoldier named Snake. Aided by the Pentagon, the FBI, and the CIA, Leonard Dawson is seeking to kill Golgo and avenge his son's death.

For his next job, Golgo is hired by a wealthy Holocaust survivor in San Francisco to kill an ex-Nazi official. With the aid of his ally Rita, a car mechanic, Golgo kills his target, but is ambushed during his getaway by Bragan and his men. Golgo kills them all, but before Bragan dies, he shoots and wounds Golgo. Snake then finds and murders Rita. Golgo later meets up with an informant named Pablo in the Amazon, to find out who set up the hit on him before leaving for Miami to rest and recuperate.

Dawson, consumed by a desire for revenge, allows Snake to rape Robert's widow, Laura, as a means of securing the killer's cooperation. Dawson also sends his granddaughter Emily and his butler Albert to an airport to murder Golgo. In a meeting with U.S. intelligence officials, Dawson demands the release of Gold and Silver, two notorious assassins on Death Row who were part of a covert government operation in Central America to test the survival rate of mercenaries in the summer of 1970; they were the only two out of 40 men to survive through the entire 80-day experiment. When the group refuses his request, Dawson threatens to halt all company operations, including oil refineries and banks. They reluctantly agree to his demands out of fear that the U.S. economy would collapse. When Laura demands to know why Dawson refuses to seek vengeance on whoever ordered the hit on Robert, he refuses to answer. Laura decides to leave Dawson, as well as Emily.

Golgo makes his way to New York City after recuperating in Miami with the aid of Pablo, the last of his contacts. Emily tries to shoot Golgo in the airport; the shot misses, and Golgo kills Albert as he reaches for a handgun. Pablo informs Golgo that Dawson ordered the hit and is currently holed up in his headquarters in Manhattan, Dawson Castle. Pablo reluctantly tells Golgo that his wife and children are being kept at ransom in the tower, then tries to shoot Golgo, who kills Pablo in self-defense.

Golgo arrives at Dawson Castle and begins his ascent to the top floor on foot. He first plays a game of cat-and-mouse with a fleet of helicopter gunships sent to kill him. While on the move, Golgo is attacked by Snake, and a brutal knifefight occurs between the two in an elevator, during which Snake manages to stab Golgo, but an attack helicopter shoots at the elevator, and Snake is killed by friendly fire as Golgo hides by the edge unseen by the helicopter. As Golgo resumes his ascent, Gold and Silver ambush and assault him. After Gold reopens one of Golgo's prior stab wounds, Golgo bludgeons Gold on the head repeatedly with the butt of his revolver, then shoots him. Silver, now blinded by rage at his partner's death, rushes at Golgo, who quickly stuffs a live grenade in Silver's mouth, which explodes and kills him.

Dawson admits failure and orders all action against Golgo to end. After Golgo enters the room, Dawson delivers a brief monologue, then attempts suicide by leaping out of the window. As he falls, Dawson remembers Robert's suicide note: Despite receiving much care from his father throughout his lifetime, Robert believed he would never fulfill his father's ambitions, but since he was unable to commit suicide himself, Robert hired Golgo instead. Before Dawson hits the ground, Golgo shoots him in the head. Dawson lands headfirst, crushing his skull and erasing any evidence that he was shot; his death is ruled as "accidental" by the authorities.

Some time later, Golgo encounters Laura, who has since become a prostitute. Trying to get the attention of men as they pass her by, she recognizes Golgo. She eventually draws a pistol and aims it at him, but when she hesitates to fire, he turns his back to her and walks away. When Laura finally fires the gun, the shot rings out and the scene fades to black. Golgo ends up walking away into the night.

== Cast ==
Character	Japanese	English (Streamline Pictures, 1992)
Golgo 13/Duke Togo	Tetsurō Sagawa	Gregory Snegoff
Leonard Dawson	Gorō Naya	Michael McConnohie
Cindy/Dr. Z	Toshiko Fujita	Joyce Kurtz
Lt. Bob Bragan	Kōsei Tomita	Mike Reynolds
Gen. T. Jefferson	Kiyoshi Kobayashi	Edward Mannix
Laura Dawson	Reiko Mutō	Edie Mirman
Rita	Kazue Komiya	Diane Michelle
E. Young	Ichirō Murakoshi	Michael Forest
F. Garvin	Shingo Kanemoto	David Povall
The Clockmaker	Koichi Chiba	Jeff Winkless as Informant
Pablo	Takeshi Aono	Kerrigan Mahan
Robert Dawson	Kei Tomiyama	Tony Oliver
Bishop Moretti	Rokurō Naya	John Dantona
Pago	Shunsuke Shima	Steve Kramer as Paco
Albert	Kōichi Kitamura	Milton James
Emily Dawson	Kumiko Takizawa	Karlyn Michelson
Computer 1 Operator	Kazuo Hayashi	Carl Macek (uncredited)
Cindy's Bodyguard	Daisuke Gōri	Kerrigan Mahan (uncredited)
Cindy's Minion	Issei Futamata	Jeff Winkless as Jean (uncredited)
Jailer	Yusaku Yara	Simon Prescott (uncredited)
Big Snake	Mitsuo Senda	Gregory Snegoff as Snake
Gold	Tetsurō Sagawa	Eddie Frierson
Silver	Rokurō Naya	Kerrigan Mahan

== Production ==
The film features the voice acting of Tetsurō Sagawa, Gorō Naya, Toshiko Fujita, Kōsei Tomita, Kiyoshi Kobayashi and Reiko Mutō. The film was released by Toho-Towa on May 28, 1983.

Golgo 13: The Professional is also the first animated film to incorporate CGI animation, created by Koichi Omura (大村皓一 Ōmura Kōichi) and Satomi Mikuriya (御厨 さと美 Mikuriya Satomi) at Toyo Links Co., Ltd. (トーヨーリンクス Tōyō Rinkusu) This is most notable in a scene where army helicopters circle around Dawson Tower and attack Golgo 13 as he climbs toward Dawson's office on the top floor.

== Reception ==
The film received largely mixed reviews from American film critics when it was screened in America by Streamline Pictures in 1992. The film was praised by Boston Globe writer Betsy Sherman who cited the animation, visual style, and English dubbing as draws. However, The New York Times reviewer Janet Maslin was highly critical of the film, noting its excessive violence and a scene of sexual assault. She was also critical of the dialogue, writing, and story of the film. LA Weekly was also critical of both the film, calling Golgo 13 himself "2 dimensional", and the story as "cookie cutter" while saying that the film lacked the humanizing elements that Lone Wolf and Cub did. Newsday critic Gene Seymore gave it 2 1/2 stars. Philadelphia Inquirer reviewer Steven Rea called the film a disappointing adaption of the original comic, citing stiff animation and dialogue, with the excessive violence being the only element that someone might find appealing.

Several reviewers compared the film to live-action film Die Hard (1988) starring Bruce Willis. Bob Strauss gave the film just one star out of four, saying the film was "amateurish", and that it lacked the exotic or fantastical elements seen in other Japanese animated films. Charles Solomon in The Los Angeles Times was also critical of the film, citing Golgo 13 as an "emotional void" on the film who "maintains the same stolid sneer while shooting people, driving through a barrage of gunfire and making love to an assortment of badly drawn women."

The 1996 movie guide Seen That, Now What? gave the film a rating of "B", stating it to be "a sprawling crime thriller laced with liberal amounts of sex and graphic violence, marked by stylized design, extreme camera angles, and unpredictable plot twists."

Retrospectively, Dave Halverson praised the film following its release on DVD in 2005, calling the film slickly made and entertaining.

== In popular culture ==
Quentin Tarantino (himself a fan of the Golgo 13 manga) paid homage to the Golgo 13 anime in the animated sequence of Kill Bill: Volume 1 (2003).
