= Taira Uematsu =

Japanese baseball coach (born 1983)

- Uematsu in 2019

San Francisco Giants – No. 99
- Coach
- Born: September 26, 1983 (age 43); Tateyama, Chiba, Japan
- Bats: Right Throws: Right

Teams
- As coach: San Francisco Giants (2020–present)

Taira Uematsu (植松 泰良, Uematsu Taira; born September 26, 1983) is a Japanese professional baseball coach for the San Francisco Giants of Major League Baseball (MLB). He is from Tateyama City, Japan. He attended Southern Illinois University Carbondale, majoring in kinesiology. He is the first Japanese full-time coach in MLB history.
