= Tetsurō Sagawa =

Japanese actor (1937–2021)

- 瑳川 哲朗
- Born: January 22, 1937; Tateyama, Chiba, Japan
- Died: February 17, 2021 (aged 84); Tokyo, Japan
- Citizenship: Japan
- Education: Waseda University
- Occupations: Actor; voice actor
- Years active: 1964–2021
- Height: 176 cm (5 ft 9 in)

Tetsurō Sagawa (瑳川 哲朗, Sagawa Tetsurō; January 22, 1937 – February 17, 2021) was a Japanese actor and voice actor from Tateyama, Chiba. He was a graduate of Waseda University.

== Filmography ==
=== Film ===
- Dai Ninjutsu Eiga: Watari (Nagato Fujibayashi)
- Fūrinkazan (Nobutomo Akiyama)
- Onmitsu Dōshin Ōedo Sōsamō (Jūzō Isaka)

=== Television drama ===
- Haru no Sakamichi (xxxx) (Kiyomasa Katō)
- Kashin (xxxx) (Shōichirō Shiraishi)
- Kitaro ga Mita Gyokusai - Mizuki Shigeru no Senso (xxxx) (Brigadier)
- Meiji no Gunzō: Umi ni Karin wo (xxxx) (Tarō Katsura)
- Ryōran Genroku (xxxx) (Tadakiyo Sakai)
- Sangokushi Jirochō (xxxx) (Taisei)
- Sanshimai (xxxx) (Isami Kondō)
- Ultraman Ace (1972–73) (Captain Goro Ryu)
- Tokugawa Ieyasu (1983) (Toshiie Maeda)
- Sanada Taiheiki (1985–86) (Tadayo Sakai)

=== Variety programs ===
- Waratte Iitomo Telephone Shocking (March 6, 1986)

=== Television animation ===
- Alexander Senki (Plato)
- Sangokushi (Guan Yu)
- Sangokushi II: Amakakeru Otokotachi (Guan Yu)

=== OVA ===
- Legend of the Galactic Heroes: Rasen Meikyū (Alfred Rosas)
- Shinkai Teigunkan (Shintetsu Hinata)

=== Theatrical animation ===
- Golgo 13 (Duke Togo/Golgo 13)

=== Dubbing roles ===
- Annie: A Royal Adventure! (Daddy Warbucks (George Hearn))
- Blood Work (2007 TV Tokyo edition) (Terry McCaleb (Clint Eastwood))
- A Bridge Too Far (1978 NTV edition) (Roy Urquhart (Sean Connery))
- Chinatown (J.J. "Jake" Gittes (Jack Nicholson))
- Django (1974 TBS edition) (Django (Franco Nero))
- Entrapment (Robert "Mac" MacDougal (Sean Connery))
- Escape to Victory (Captain John Colby (Michael Caine))
- Gunfight at the O.K. Corral (1985 TV Asahi edition) (Wyatt Earp (Burt Lancaster))
- Just Cause (Paul Armstrong (Sean Connery))
- Lawrence of Arabia (General Allenby (Jack Hawkins))
- Mars Attacks! (2000 TV Tokyo edition) (President James Dale, Art Land (Jack Nicholson))
- Million Dollar Baby (2006 TV Tokyo edition) (Frankie Dunn (Clint Eastwood))
- Mister Roberts (1974 TV Asahi edition) (Douglas A. 'Doug' Roberts (Henry Fonda))
- Once Upon a Time in the West (Frank (Henry Fonda))
- Rising Sun (Captain John Connor (Sean Connery))
- Space: 1999 (Commander John Koenig (Martin Landau))
- There Was a Crooked Man... (Woodward Lopeman (Henry Fonda))
- Unforgiven (1996 TV Asahi edition) (William "Will" Munny (Clint Eastwood))
- All's Fair (1977 Asahi Broadcasting Corporation edition) (Richard C. Barrington ( Richard Crenna))
