= Edward Mannix =

American novelist

- Born: Edward Leo Mannix; U.S.
- Died: 1995; Bristol, Maine, U.S.
- Occupations: Voice actor, author, journalist

Edward Leo Mannix was an American voice actor, author and journalist. He is mainly known for his work in dubbing films and TV shows in Rome and Los Angeles, including Caliber 9, Golgo 13: The Professional and Robotech: The Movie. He was arguably best known for being the English voice of actor Bud Spencer.

His published works include An End to Fury, A Journal of Love and The Widower. He was also a stringer for The Ring while living in Italy.

He died in Bristol, Maine, in 1995.

== Selected filmography ==
- Caliber 9 (1972) as Rocco (voice, English version)
- The New York Ripper (1982) as Lt. Fred Williams (voice, English version)
- 1990: The Bronx Warriors (1982) as Hammer (voice, English version)
- The Lonely Lady (1983) as Awards MC (only live-action role)
- Golgo 13: The Professional (1983) as General T. Jefferson (voice, English version)
- Castle in the Sky (1986) as Uncle Pom (voice, Streamline Pictures English version)
- Robotech: The Movie (1986) (additional voices, English version, credited as Cyn Branch)
- Robotech II: The Sentinels (1988) as Cabell (voice, English version, credited as Cyn Branch)
