= Tateyama Station (Chiba) =

Railway station in Tateyama, Chiba Prefecture, Japan

Tateyama Station 館山駅
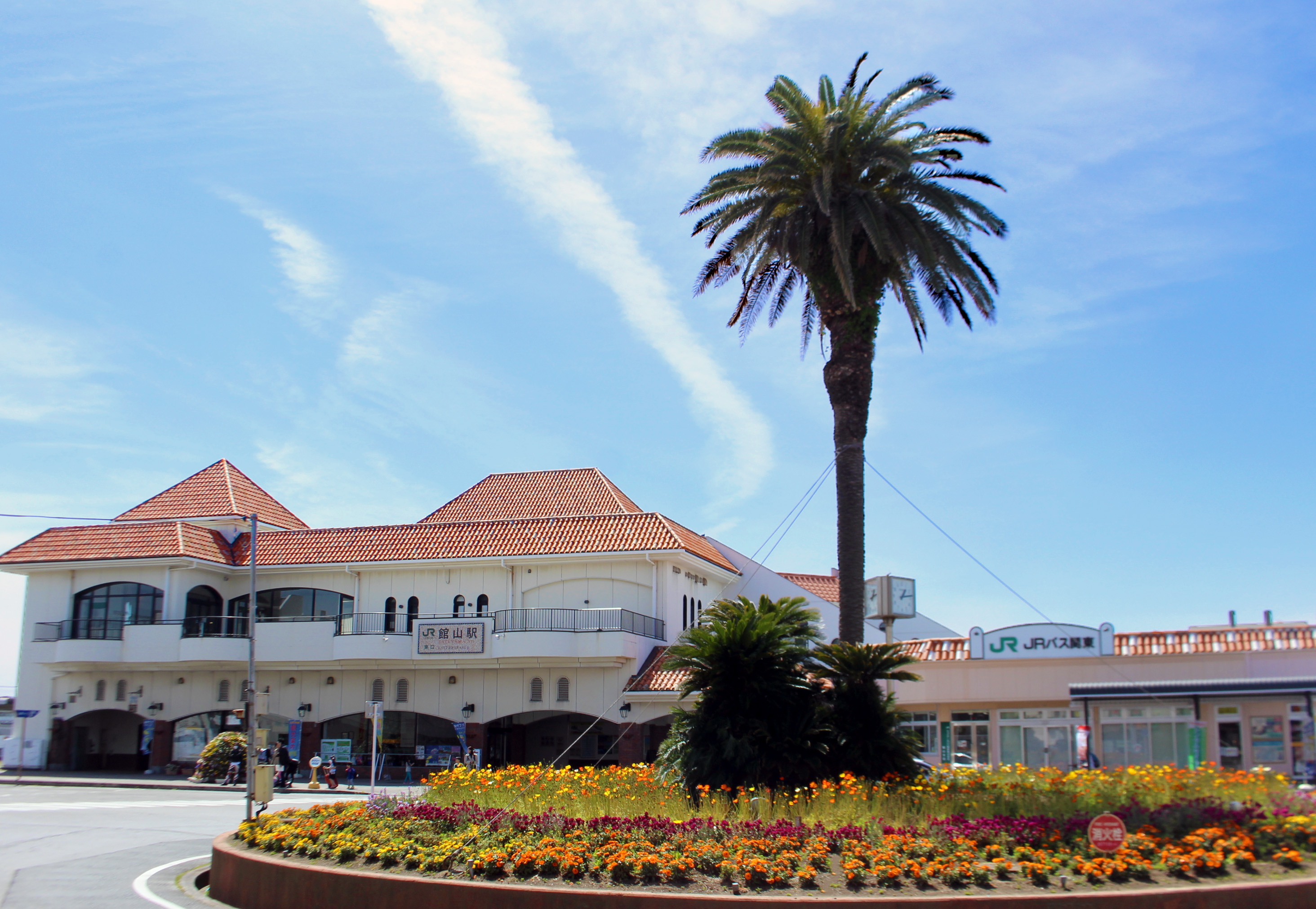
- Tateyama Station in May 2019

General information
- Location: 1887 Hōjō, Tateyama-shi, Chiba-ken 294-0045; Japan
- Coordinates: 34.9956°N 139.8618°E
- Operator: JR East
- Line: ■ Uchibō Line
- Distance: 85.9 km from Soga
- Platforms: 1 side + 1 island platform

Other information
- Status: Staffed (Midori no Madoguchi)
- Website: Official website

History
- Opened: May 24, 1919
- Former names: Awa-Hōjō (until 1946)

Passengers
- FY2019: 1599

Services
Preceding station	JR East	Following station
Nakofunakata towards Soga or Chiba	Uchibō Line Local	Kokonoe towards Awa-Kamogawa
Location
- Location within Chiba Prefecture Location within Japan

Tateyama Station (Japanese: 館山駅, Hepburn: Tateyama-eki) is a passenger railway station in the city of Tateyama, Chiba Prefecture, Japan, operated by the East Japan Railway Company (JR East).

== Lines ==
Tateyama Station is served by the Uchibō Line, and is located 85.9 km from the terminus of the line at Soga Station.

== Station layout ==
The station consists of one side platform and one island platforms serving three tracks. The station has a Midori no Madoguchi staffed ticket office.

=== Platforms ===
1	■ Uchibō Line	for Chikura and Awa-Kamogawa
2/3	■ Uchibō Line	for Kimitsu, Kisarazu, and Chiba

== History ==
The station opened on May 24, 1919, as Awa-Hōjō Station (安房北条駅) on what was then called the Hōjō Line. The Hōjō Line was merged with the Bōsō Line in 1927. The station was renamed to its current name on March 1, 1946. Scheduled freight operations were suspended from November 15, 1982. The station was absorbed into the JR East network upon the privatization of the Japanese National Railways (JNR) on April 1, 1987. A new station building was completed in March 1999.

As part of celebrations for its 100th anniversary, Tateyama Station began using heavy metal band X Japan's song "Forever Love" as its departure melody in November 2019, as the band was founded in Tateyama.

== Bus terminal ==
=== Highway buses ===
- Boso Nanohana; For Tokyo Station
- Shinjuku Nanohana; For Shinjuku Station
- Nanso Satomi; For Kisarazu-Hatorino, Soga Station, Chiba Station, Chiba-Chūō Station, and Chiba-Minato Station

=== Route buses ===
- Awa-Shirahama Bus Terminal

== Passenger statistics ==
In fiscal 2019, the station was used by an average of 1599 passengers daily (boarding passengers only).

== Surrounding area ==
- National Route 127
- National Route 128
- National Route 410
- Tateyama Port
- Tateyama City Hall
- JMSDF Tateyama Air Base
- Chiba Prefectural Awa High School

== See also ==
- List of railway stations in Japan
