= Tateyama, Chiba =

Tateyama 館山市
- City
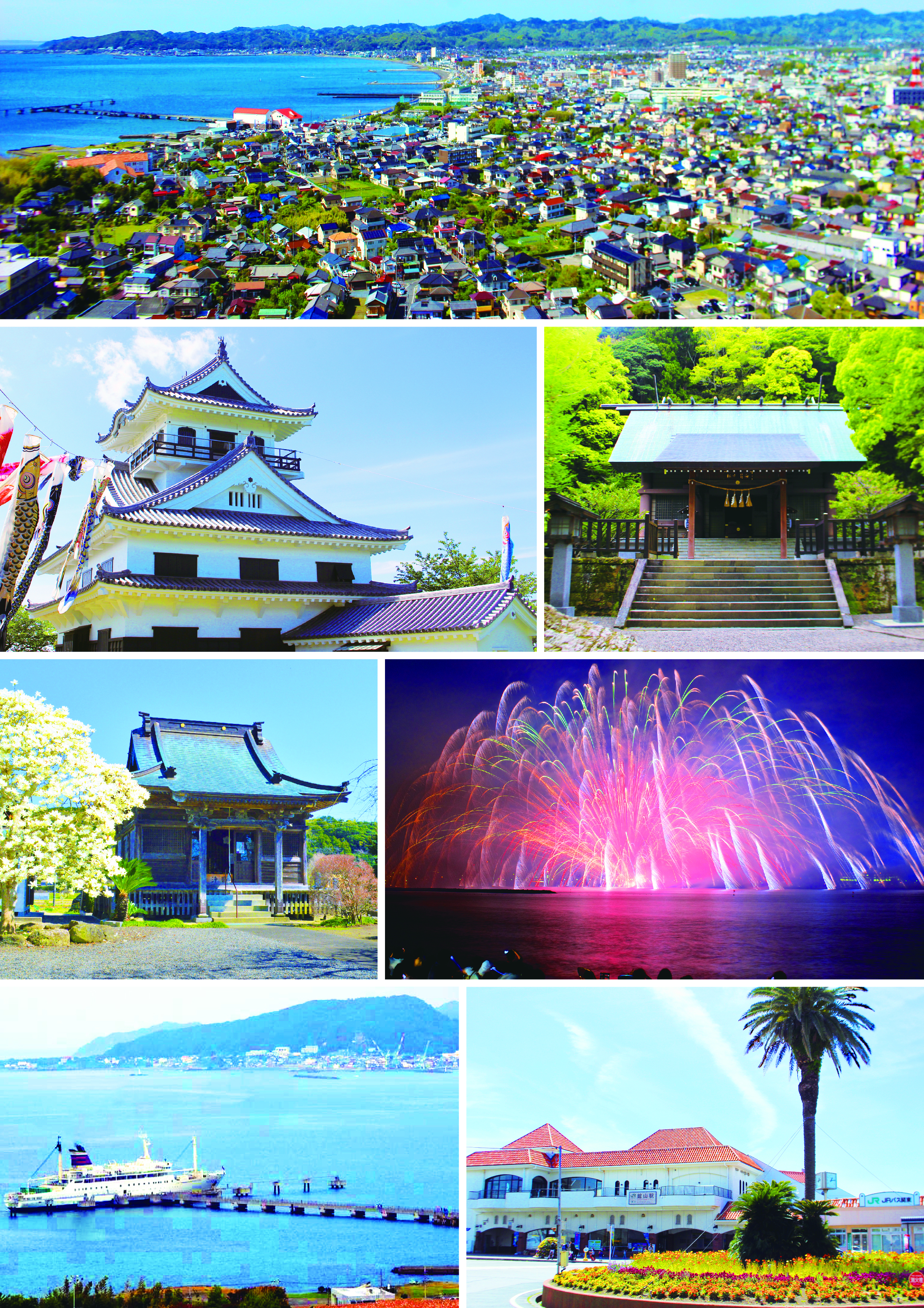
Panorama of Tateyama
Tateyama Castle	Awa Shrine
Awa Kokubun-ji	Fireworks at Tateyama Port
Tateyama Port	Tateyama Station
- Flag Seal

- Location of Tateyama in Chiba Prefecture

- Coordinates: 34°59′47.7″N 139°52′11.9″E
- Country: Japan
- Region: Kantō
- Prefecture: Chiba

Area
  - Total: 110.05 km^{2} (42.49 sq mi)

Population (November 1, 2020)
  - Total: 44,865
  - Density: 407.68/km^{2} (1,055.9/sq mi)
- Time zone: UTC+9 (Japan Standard Time)
- Phone number: 0470-22-3111
- Address: 1145-1 Hōjō, Tateyama-shi, Chiba-ken 294-8601
- Climate: Cfa
- Website: Official website
- Symbols
- Tree: Camellia

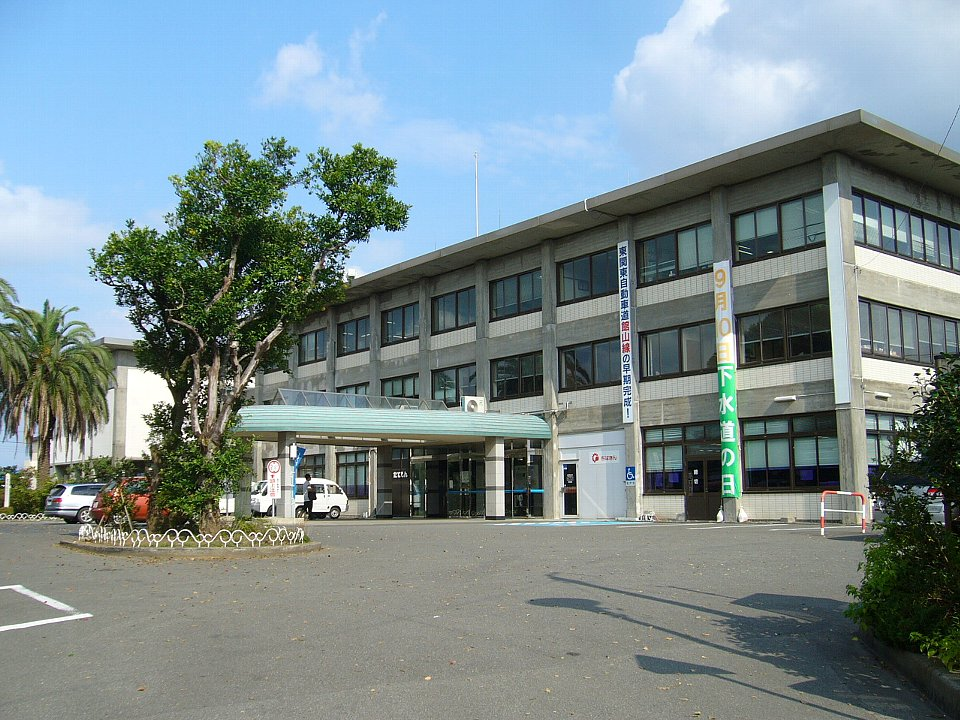
Tateyama City Hall

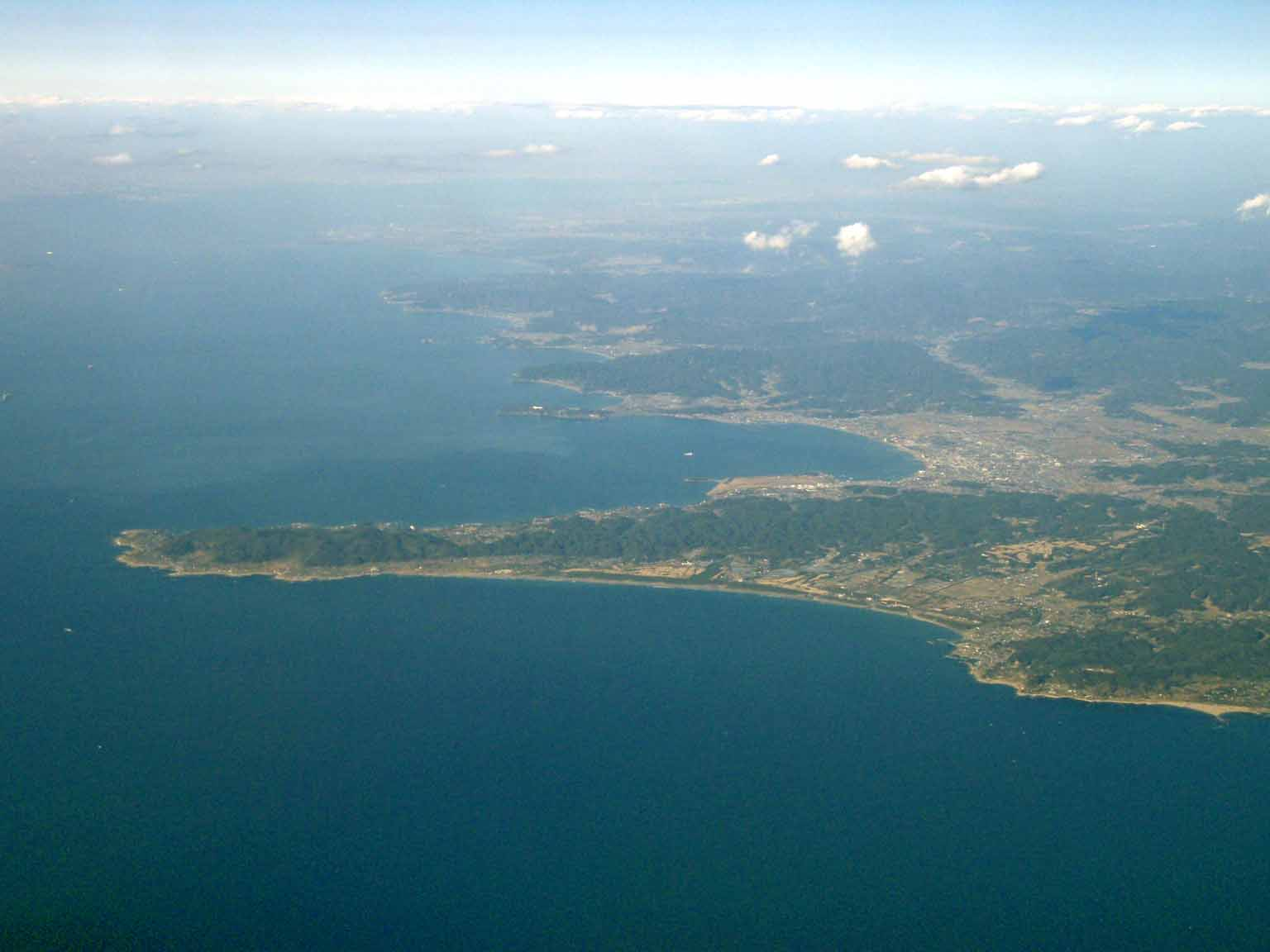
Cape Sunosaki and Tateyama City

Views of Tateyama from Daifuku-ji, 2017

Tateyama (館山市, Tateyama-shi) is a city located in Chiba Prefecture, Japan. As of 1 November 2020, the city had an estimated population of 44,865 in 20,558 households and a population density of 410 persons per km^{2}. The total area of the city is 110.05 square kilometres (42.49 sq mi).

== Geography ==
Tateyama is located at the far southern tip of the Bōsō Peninsula, facing the Pacific Ocean to the east and south, and the entrance to Tokyo Bay on the west. It is about 70 kilometers from the prefectural capital at Chiba, and within 70 to 80 kilometers from central Tokyo.

=== Neighboring municipalities ===
Chiba Prefecture

- Minamibōsō

=== Climate ===
Tateyama has a humid subtropical climate (Köppen Cfa) characterized by warm summers and cool winters with light to no snowfall. The average annual temperature in Tateyama is 16.2 °C (61.2 °F). The average annual rainfall is 1,845.9 mm (72.67 in) with October as the wettest month. The temperatures are highest on average in August, at around 26.7 °C (80.1 °F), and lowest in January, at around 6.4 °C (43.5 °F).

Climate data for Tateyama (1991−2020 normals, extremes 1968−present)
Month	Jan	Feb	Mar	Apr	May	Jun	Jul	Aug	Sep	Oct	Nov	Dec	Year
Record high °C (°F)	23.2 (73.8)	22.7 (72.9)	24.9 (76.8)	26.4 (79.5)	32.3 (90.1)	34.2 (93.6)	36.8 (98.2)	36.6 (97.9)	34.5 (94.1)	30.9 (87.6)	26.2 (79.2)	23.7 (74.7)	36.8 (98.2)
Mean maximum °C (°F)	17.2 (63.0)	18.6 (65.5)	20.9 (69.6)	23.9 (75.0)	27.0 (80.6)	30.0 (86.0)	33.1 (91.6)	34.0 (93.2)	32.1 (89.8)	28.2 (82.8)	23.5 (74.3)	20.0 (68.0)	34.3 (93.7)
Mean daily maximum °C (°F)	11.3 (52.3)	11.9 (53.4)	14.6 (58.3)	19.0 (66.2)	22.8 (73.0)	25.2 (77.4)	28.9 (84.0)	30.8 (87.4)	27.8 (82.0)	23.0 (73.4)	18.4 (65.1)	13.9 (57.0)	20.6 (69.1)
Daily mean °C (°F)	6.4 (43.5)	7.0 (44.6)	10.1 (50.2)	14.5 (58.1)	18.5 (65.3)	21.5 (70.7)	25.2 (77.4)	26.7 (80.1)	23.7 (74.7)	18.6 (65.5)	13.7 (56.7)	8.9 (48.0)	16.2 (61.2)
Mean daily minimum °C (°F)	1.2 (34.2)	1.8 (35.2)	5.1 (41.2)	9.7 (49.5)	14.5 (58.1)	18.4 (65.1)	22.4 (72.3)	23.7 (74.7)	20.3 (68.5)	14.6 (58.3)	8.9 (48.0)	3.8 (38.8)	12.0 (53.7)
Mean minimum °C (°F)	−3.4 (25.9)	−3.2 (26.2)	−1.0 (30.2)	2.3 (36.1)	8.2 (46.8)	13.1 (55.6)	18.2 (64.8)	19.4 (66.9)	14.5 (58.1)	8.2 (46.8)	2.7 (36.9)	−1.7 (28.9)	−4.0 (24.8)
Record low °C (°F)	−6.7 (19.9)	−6.5 (20.3)	−5.7 (21.7)	−1.2 (29.8)	4.3 (39.7)	8.5 (47.3)	9.3 (48.7)	15.2 (59.4)	10.0 (50.0)	4.0 (39.2)	−1.5 (29.3)	−6.4 (20.5)	−6.7 (19.9)
Average precipitation mm (inches)	85.9 (3.38)	81.9 (3.22)	160.9 (6.33)	155.7 (6.13)	153.2 (6.03)	211.5 (8.33)	179.2 (7.06)	103.4 (4.07)	222.0 (8.74)	257.5 (10.14)	143.5 (5.65)	91.2 (3.59)	1,845.9 (72.67)
Average snowfall cm (inches)	trace	1 (0.4)	0 (0)	0 (0)	0 (0)	0 (0)	0 (0)	0 (0)	0 (0)	0 (0)	0 (0)	0 (0)	1 (0.4)
Average precipitation days (≥ 1.0 mm)	6.4	6.7	10.7	10.1	9.8	11.7	8.9	6.2	10.8	11.2	9.2	6.9	108.6
Average snowy days (≥ 1 cm)	0.1	0.2	0	0	0	0	0	0	0	0	0	0	0.3
Average relative humidity (%)	63	64	68	73	77	83	84	82	81	78	74	67	75
Mean monthly sunshine hours	176.8	155.2	164.5	179.1	185.0	135.3	179.2	216.2	152.5	137.0	146.5	164.0	1,991.7
Source: Japan Meteorological Agency

== Demographics ==
Per Japanese census data, the population of Tateyama has declined in recent decades.

Historical population
Year	Pop.	±%
1920	45,657	—
1930	48,145	+5.4%
1940	46,542	−3.3%
1950	59,424	+27.7%
1960	57,643	−3.0%
1970	55,236	−4.2%
1980	56,257	+1.8%
1990	54,575	−3.0%
2000	51,412	−5.8%
2010	49,290	−4.1%
2020	45,153	−8.4%

== History ==
The area of present-day Tateyama was part of ancient Awa Province, dominated by the Satomi clan during the Sengoku period, who ruled from Tateyama Castle. After the Edo period, most of the territory was part of the feudal domain of Tateyama Domain (館山藩, Tateyama-han). After the start of the Meiji period, Tateyama Town (in Awa District), Chiba Prefecture was proclaimed on April 1, 1889 with the creation of the modern municipalities system. Tateyama annexed neighboring Toyosu Village on April 1, 1914, and merged with Hōjō Town to form Tateyamahōjō Town on April 18, 1933.

The city of Tateyama was proclaimed on November 3, 1939, with the merger of Tateyamahōjō with Nago and Funagata towns. The city was a base for the Imperial Japanese Navy Air Service as well as a Naval Gunnery School until the end of World War II. Tateyama expanded on May 3, 1954 by annexing six surrounding villages.

== Government ==
Tateyama has a mayor-council form of government with a directly elected mayor and a unicameral city council of 18 members. Tateyama contributes one member to the Chiba Prefectural Assembly. In terms of national politics, the city is part of Chiba 12th district of the lower house of the Diet of Japan.

== Economy ==
The economy of Tateyama is based on commercial fishing, horticulture and summer tourism. The population of Tateyama surges during much of the summer. Tateyama is a popular destination for vacationing due to its proximity to Tokyo and its reputation as a "beach" or "surf town". There are numerous resort and holiday hotels dotting the coastline. Every August, tens of thousands of people gather on Hōjō Beach for the annual fireworks display.

Japan's first same-sex reality dating show called The Boyfriend (Japanese: ボーイフレンド, Hepburn: Bōifurendo) was produced by Netflix in Tateyama.

== Education ==
Tateyama has ten public elementary schools and three public middle schools operated by the city government, and three public high schools operated by the Chiba Prefectural Board of Education. The prefecture also operates four special education school for the handicapped. The National Tateyama Maritime Poly-technical School is located in Tateyama.

== Transportation ==
=== Railway ===
JR East – Uchibō Line

- Nakofunakata - Tateyama - Kokonoe

=== Highway ===
- Tateyama Expressway
- National Route 127
- National Route 128
- National Route 410

=== Airport ===
- JMSDF Tateyama Air Base (no civilian traffic)

== Sister cities ==
- Bellingham, Washington, United States, sister city since 1958
- Port Stephens, Australia, friendship city from 1999 to 2009, sister city since 2009
- Suao, Taiwan sister city since 2025
- (Japan) Fuefuki, Yamanashi, since May 1973

== Local attractions ==
- Awa Shrine, a Shinto shrine
- Kannon Hall of Daifuku-ji, a Buddhist temple
- Monument to Comfort women, Ōga District
- Nagisanoeki Tateyama, a branch of the city museum with materials from the former Chiba Prefectural Awa Museum
- Nambo Paradise Botanical Garden
- Nago-dera, a Buddhist temple
- Tateyama Castle, reconstructed in 1982
- Tateyama Municipal Museum

== Notable people ==
- Ryota Ozawa, actor
- Tetsurō Sagawa, actor, voice actor
- Toshi, musician
- Taira Uematsu (born 1983), coach for the San Francisco Giants, first-ever Japanese coach in Major League Baseball
- Yoshiki, musician

== In popular culture ==
The popular television drama Beach Boys, which originally aired on Japanese television in the summer of 1997, although with a plot set in the Shōnan region, was filmed largely in Tateyama.
