= Nago-ji =

Buddhist temple in Tateyama, Chiba, Japan

Nago-dera
- 那古寺
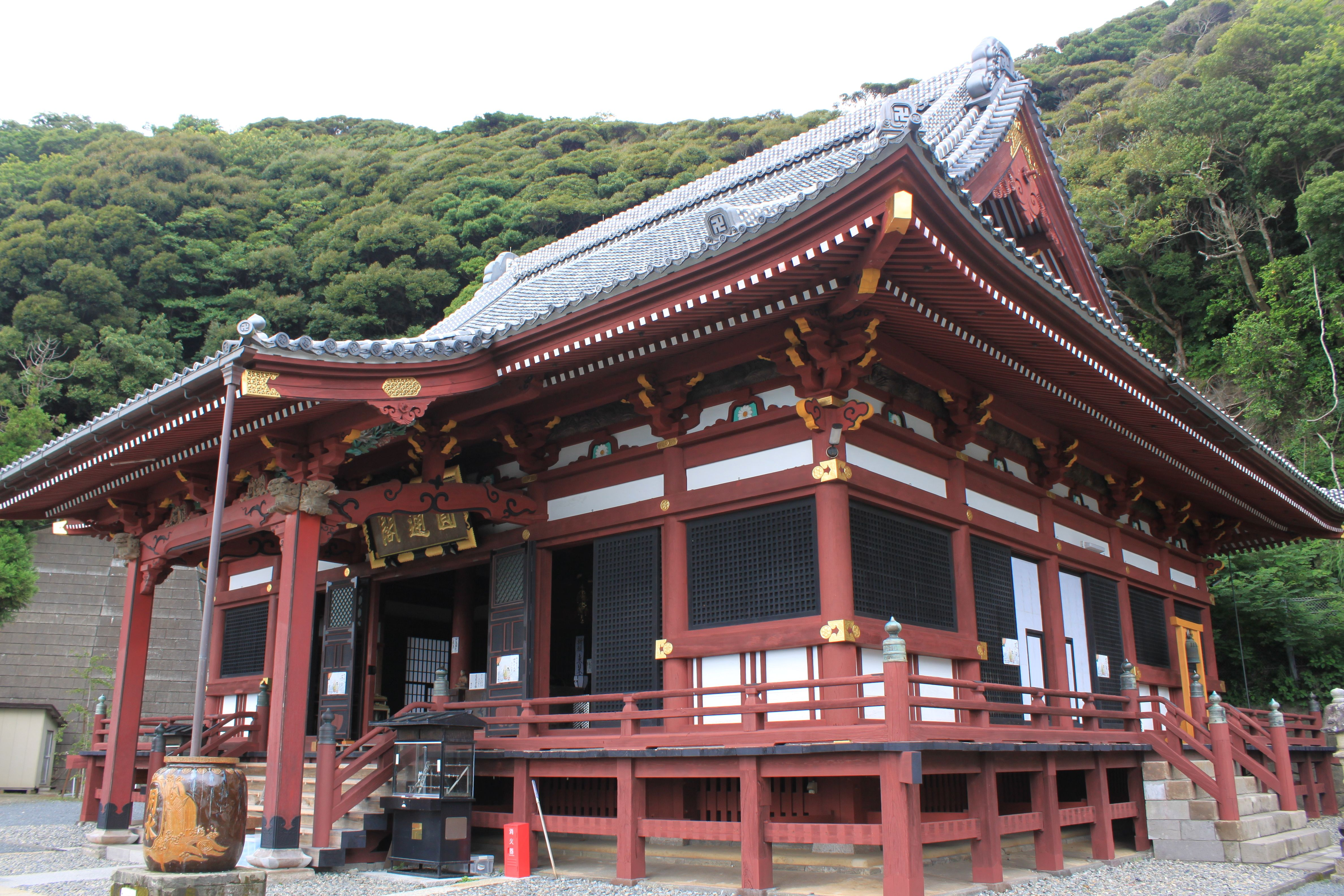
- Kannon-dō (Main hall)

- Nago-ji Nago-ji (Japan)

Religion
- Affiliation: Buddhism
- Deity: Senjū Kannon (Sahasrabhuja)
- Rite: Shingon-shū Chizan-ha

Location
- Location: 1125 Nago, Tateyama-shi, Chiba-ken
- Country: Japan
- Coordinates: 35°1′32″N 139°51′28.5″E

Architecture
- Founder: c.Empress Genshō
- Completed: c.717

Website
- http://www.bandou.gr.jp/33.htm
- National Important Cultural Property

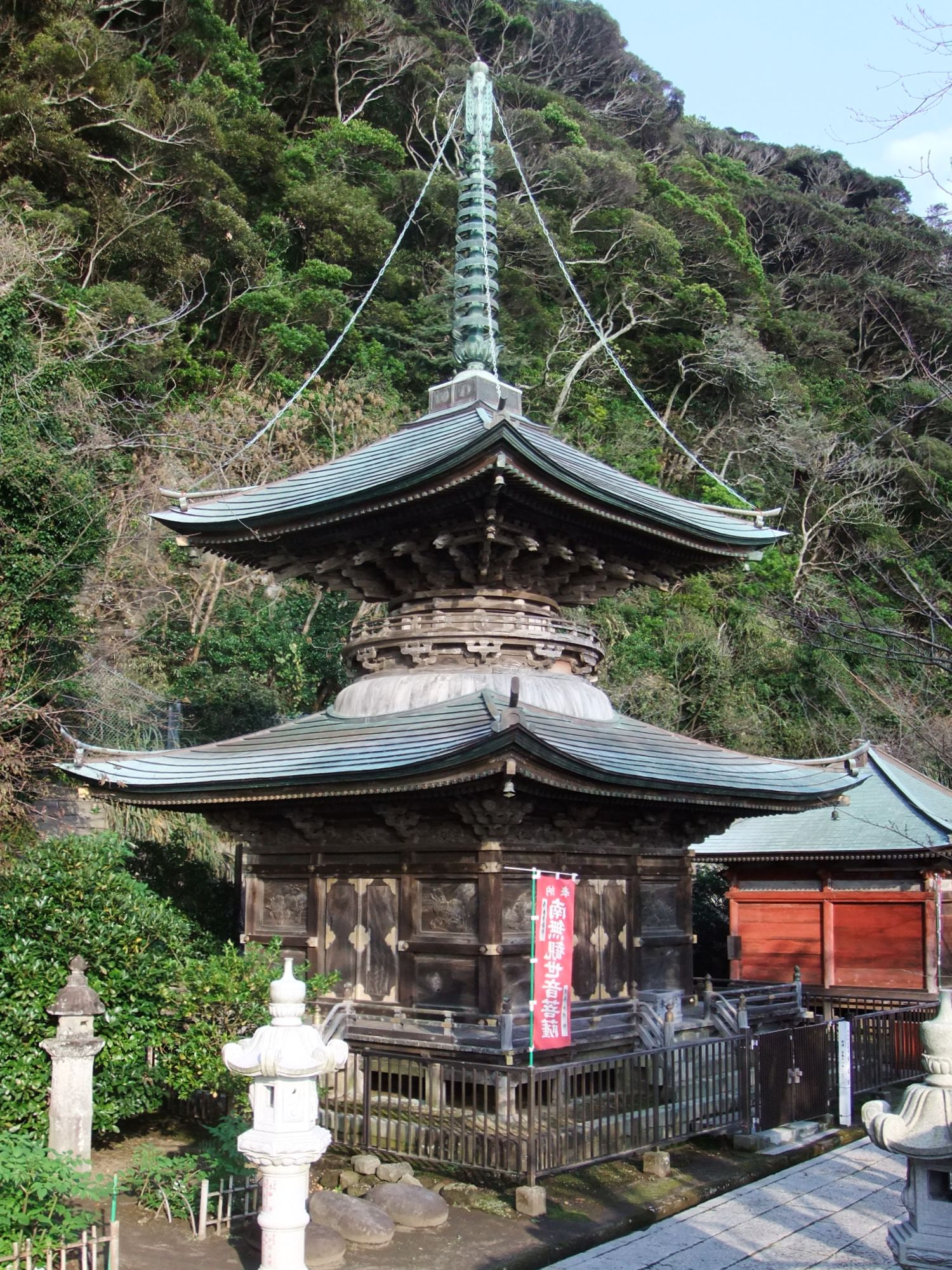
Tahōtō of Nago-dera (1761)

Nago-ji (那古寺) is a Buddhist temple located in the Nago neighborhood of the city of Tateyama, in southern Chiba Prefecture, Japan. It belongs to the Shingon-shū Chizan-ha sect and its honzon is a statue of Senjū Kannon Bosatsu (Sahasrabhūja). The temple is the 33rd and final stop on the Bandō Sanjūsankasho pilgrimage route of approximately 1,360 kilometers from Sugimoto-dera in Kamakura. The temple is also called Nago-dera using the alternate pronunciation of the final Chinese character in its name, or the Nago Kannon (古寺観音), after its primary object of worship.

== Location ==
Nago-dera is located on the middle slopes of Mount Nago at the southern tip of the Bōsō Peninsula, and is surrounded by forest. The area around the temple has important stands of sudajii Castanopsis, the tabunoki machilus species of laurel, the yabunikkei species of cinnamomum, camellia and the himeyuzuri species of daphniphyllum.

== History ==
The foundation of this temple is uncertain. According to temple legend contained in the Nago-dera engi text, Nago-dera was founded by when the wandering holy ascetic Gyōki carved an image of Kannon from a piece of incense wood found in the seas around 717 AD. He dedicated the statue for the recovery of Empress Genshō from an illness, and she soon staged a miraculous recovery. However, no historical documents have survived to substantiate this legend. The temple was used as a place of worship by successive samurai clans, starting with Minamoto no Yoritomo, who fled to Awa Province after his defeat at the Battle of Ishibashiyama. He prayed at this temple for safety and eventual victory over the Heike clan. The temple was thereafter associated with the samurai class, and supported by Ashikaga Takauji, and Satomi Yoshizane in the Muromachi period. Most of the temple was destroyed by a fire following the 1703 Genroku earthquake. The main hall, also called Kannon-dō, was rebuilt in 1758. The other buildings followed a little later.

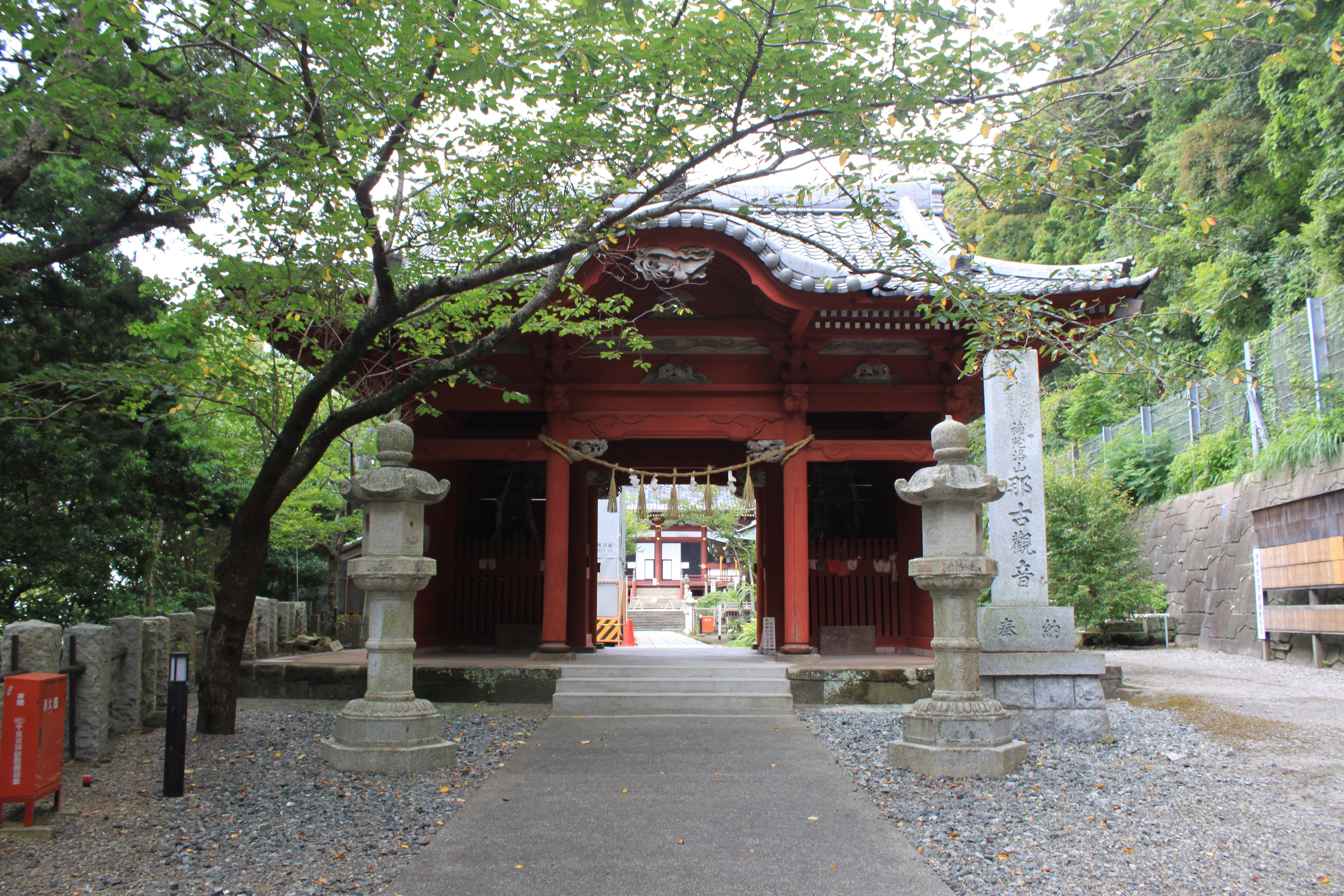
Niō Gate

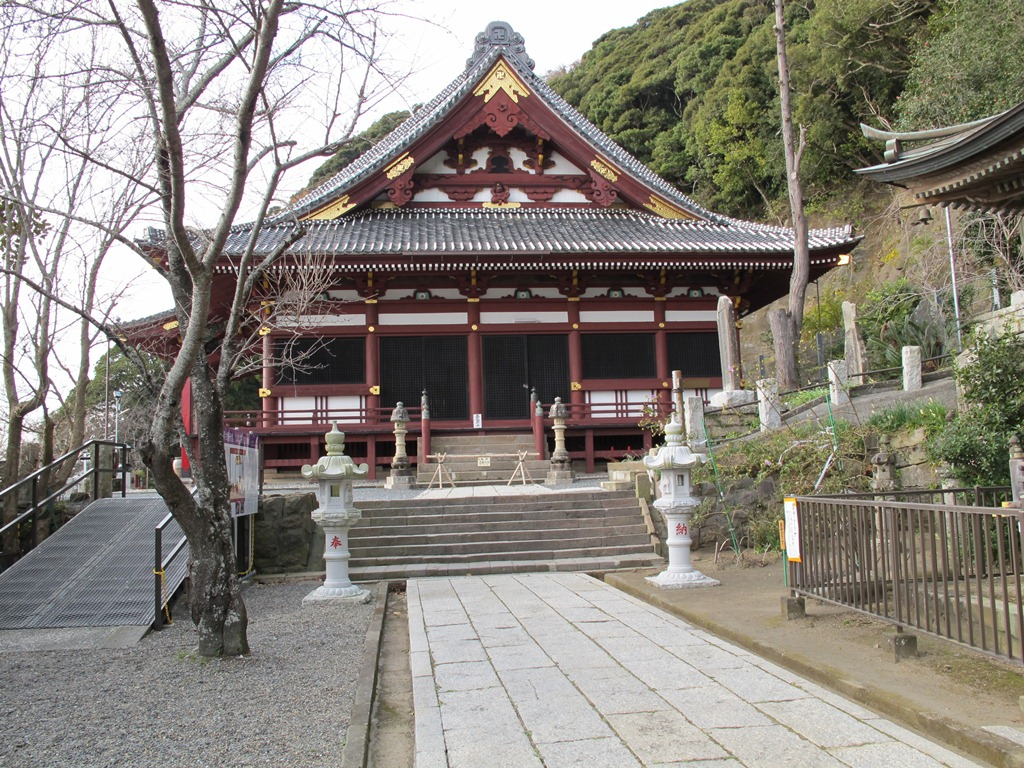
Kannon-do

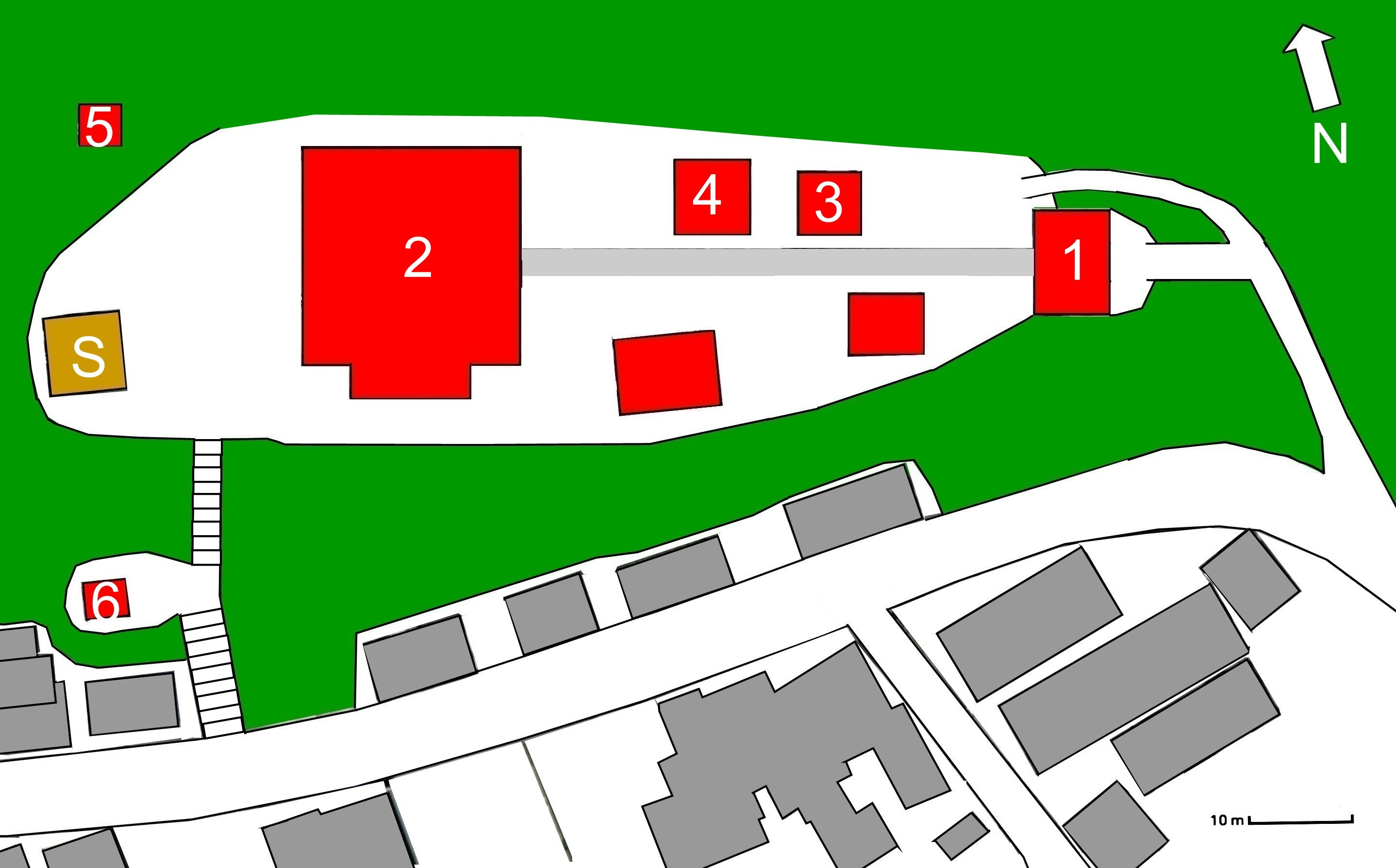
Temple layout

== Cultural Properties ==
=== National Important Cultural Properties ===
- Bronze standing Senjū Kannon Bosatsu (銅造千手観音立像) Kamakura period, This statue is approximately 105-cm tall and has 42 hands. The head and center of the body are cast as a single piece, and the hands are cast separately, and attached at the shoulders. The left and right hands are divided into three stages: 6 front hands, 7 middle hands, and 6 back hands.The front and back hands are nailed to the middle row, and the middle row is inserted into the body. Each strand of his hair stands out and is depicted realistically. It shows the high level of casting technology at the time. There is an inscription "Taira Tanetoki" on the side joint of the statue, which is thought to be Chiba Hachirō Tanetoki whose name can be seen in the "Azuma Kagami", and it can be confirmed that the statue was made in the early Kamakura period.

=== Chiba Prefectural Tangible Cultural Properties ===
- Kannon-dō (観音堂) Edo period. This 5x5 bay building, completed in 1758, is the oldest remaining structure at the temple.
- Tahōtō (多宝塔) Edo period. This pagoda, completed in 1761, is located between the Kannon-dō and Niōmon gate. Inside a wooden Hōtō-style pagoda is placed in the central altar. This wooden pagoda is also part of the Chiba Prefectural Tangible Cultural Properties designation.
- Silk painting of Hachiman as a monk (絹本著色僧形八幡神像) Nanboku-chō period. This painting has been passed down to Nago-ji from the Tsurudani Hachiman-gū, a Shinto shrine once under its control. The painting is approximately 160.5-cm tall and 106-cm wide, and its composition is in the form of a triad, centering on the figure of Hachiman, the kami seated in a lotus position with a staff in his right hand, and a rosary in his left hand with a red sun wheel above his head, and flanked by smaller figures on the right and left.
- Wooden seated statue of Amida Nyorai (木造阿弥陀如来坐像), Kamakura period. This statue is approximately 140-cm tall and was carved from a single piece of cypress wood. The body is coated with black lacquer. Currently, it has wooden eyes, but it is thought that it was originally with crystal eyes. Inside the statue, there is an ink inscription indicating that it was repaired in 1324.
- Shuji Hokke-kyō Fumon-hin (繍字法華経普門品), Yuan dynasty. This Lotus sutra is made from embroidery with letters onto a white silk cloth using indigo silk thread, and the character "Buddha" sewn using gold thread. There are colored miniature paintings on the endpapers depicting Buddha, Fugen Bosatsu, and the two Tenbu, and the endpapers depict Jūichimen Kannon. The colophon at the end of this book states that in the 21st year of Zhizheng (1361) of the Yuan dynasty in China, a daughter of the Yao clan of Jiading in Pingjiang Prefecture (Wu County, Jiangsu Province) raised money to buy silk cloth, and cooperated with many women to produce this sutra. Details of its importation into Japan are unknown, but it was given to Nako-ji in 1702.

=== Tateyama City Tangible Cultural Properties ===
- Kabuki Ō-ema (歌舞伎大絵馬) This votive tablet is a 121-cm long and 152-cm wide cedar board. The theme depicted on the ema is from the kabuki play Kokin Brothers Hei Soga, and the entire surface of the ema depicts a Kabuki aragoto scene in which Asahina Saburo is pulling on Sōga Gorō's armor. On the right, Sōga Gorō, who is thought to be Ichikawa Danjūrō I, has a benikuma on his face, and Asahina Saburō, who is believed to be Nakamura Denkuro, has a vermilion dark circle around his eyes. The name of the dedicatee is written in the lower right corner of the votive tablet as Shimazuya Shirobe, Honbune-chō, Edo, Bushu, but there is no sign of the author's signature. The painting is characterized by a unique technique known as "gourd foot worm painting", which uses lines that look like crawling earthworms and a shape that looks like an upside-down gourd to express strength. For this reason, it is speculated that the author of this votive tablet was Torii Kiyomasu, who perfected the technique. On the back of the votive tablet is written in ink, "Kyōhō 10, Otsusai" (1725, April 15).
- Takase Bunsho (高瀬家古文書) This book was created for the purpose of rebuilding the Kannon-dō and the Tahōtō Pagoda, which were among the buildings of Nago-ji that were destroyed in the 1703 earthquake. In 1757, Iseya Jinemon, a merchant from Higashimachi, Nako Village, became the benefactor, and collected a total of over 398 ryō from various villages in Awa. There are also records of construction costs, and a record of the opening ceremony of the principal image of the Senjũ Kannon, and the start of fundraising, making it possible to know in detail the circumstances surrounding the construction of the temple.
