= Aloha Garden Tateyama =

Botanical garden in Tateyama, Chiba, Japan

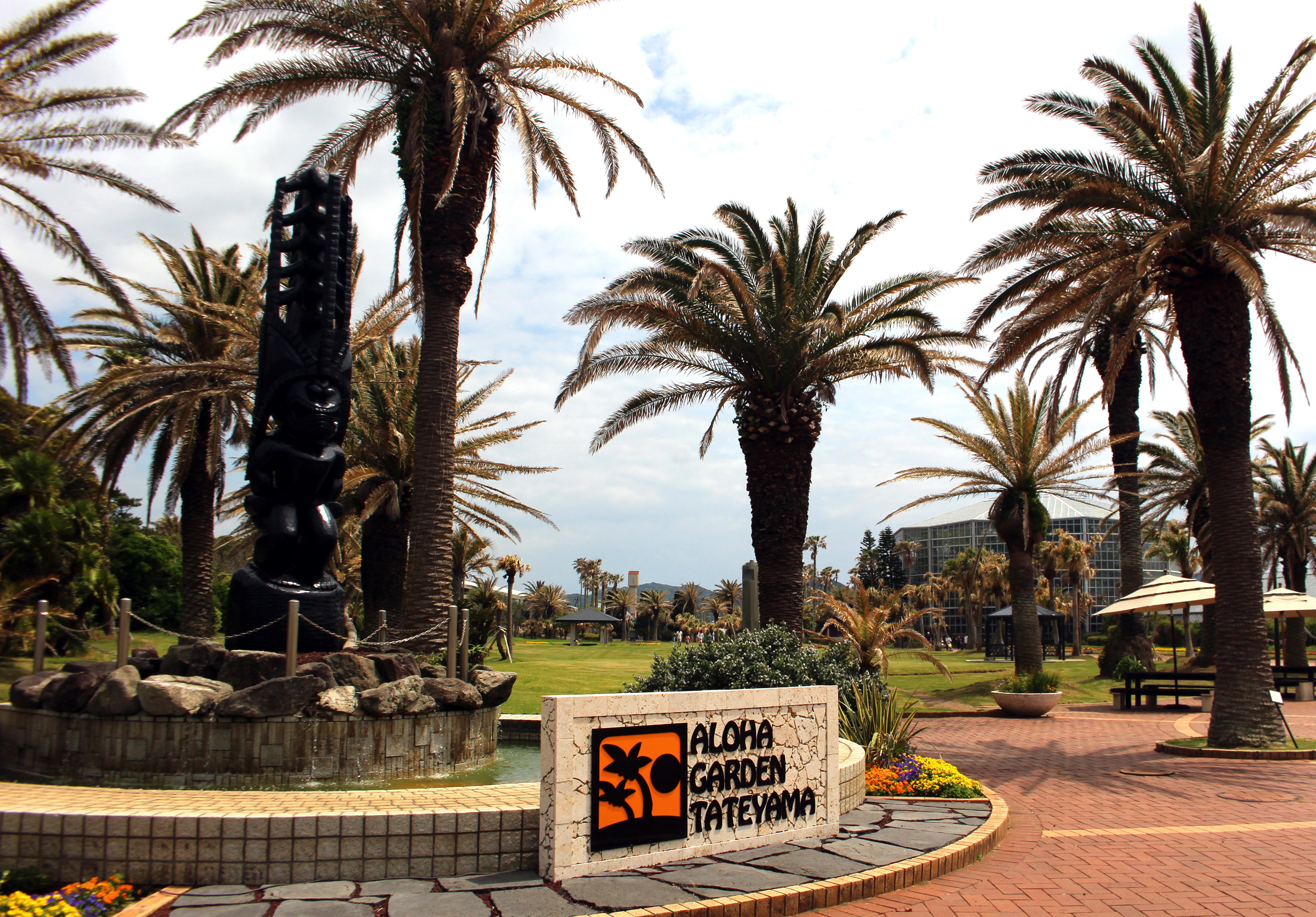

- Location within Japan
- Interactive map of Aloha Garden Tateyama
- Type: Botanical garden
- Location: Tateyama, Chiba, Japan
- Coordinates: 34°56′23″N 139°49′18″E
- Website: http://www.aloha-garden-t.com/

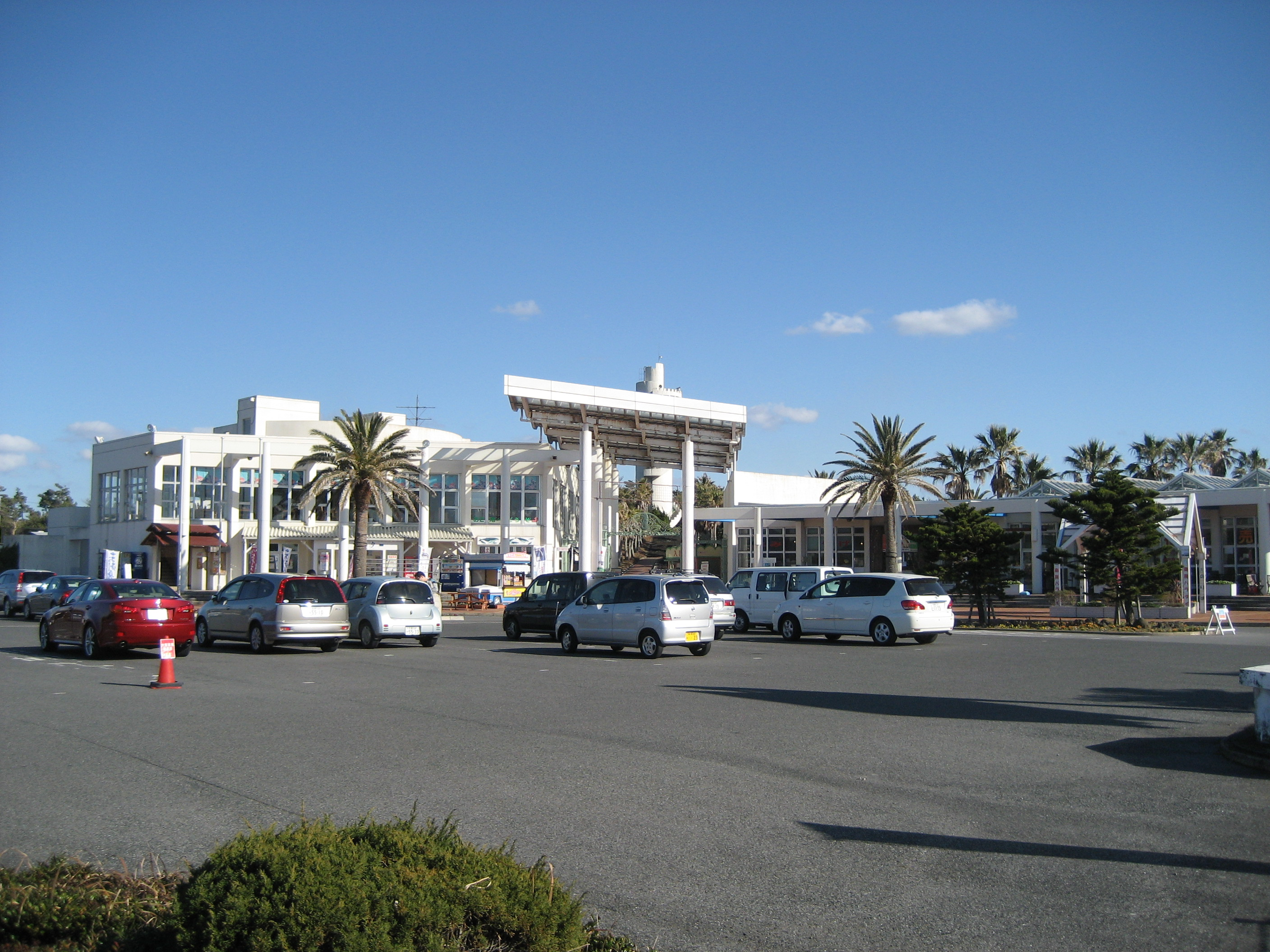
Entry to the Botanical Gardens

The Aloha Garden Tateyama (アロハガーデンたてやま, Aloha Garden Tateyama) is a botanical garden located in Tateyama, Chiba, Japan. It is open daily; an admission fee is charged.

The garden is associated with the Michi no eki Nambō off of Chiba Prefectural Highway 257, nicknamed the “Flower Route”. Operated by the Chiba Prefectural Government, the complex consists of a golf course, family park, as well as the botanical gardens.

Within the botanical garden portion of the complex are several greenhouses plus an outdoor area with observation tower, petting zoo, ponds, etc. The greenhouses exhibit tropical plants, butterflies, and birds. A Singapore Orchid House and Merlion statue reflect the garden's association with the Singapore Botanic Gardens.

On February 26, 2025, it was announced on the official homepage that the park would be permanently closed after March 31, 2025.

== See also ==
- List of botanical gardens in Japan
