= Daifuku-ji =

Buddhist temple in Tateyama, Chiba Prefecture, Japan

Daifuku-ji 大福寺
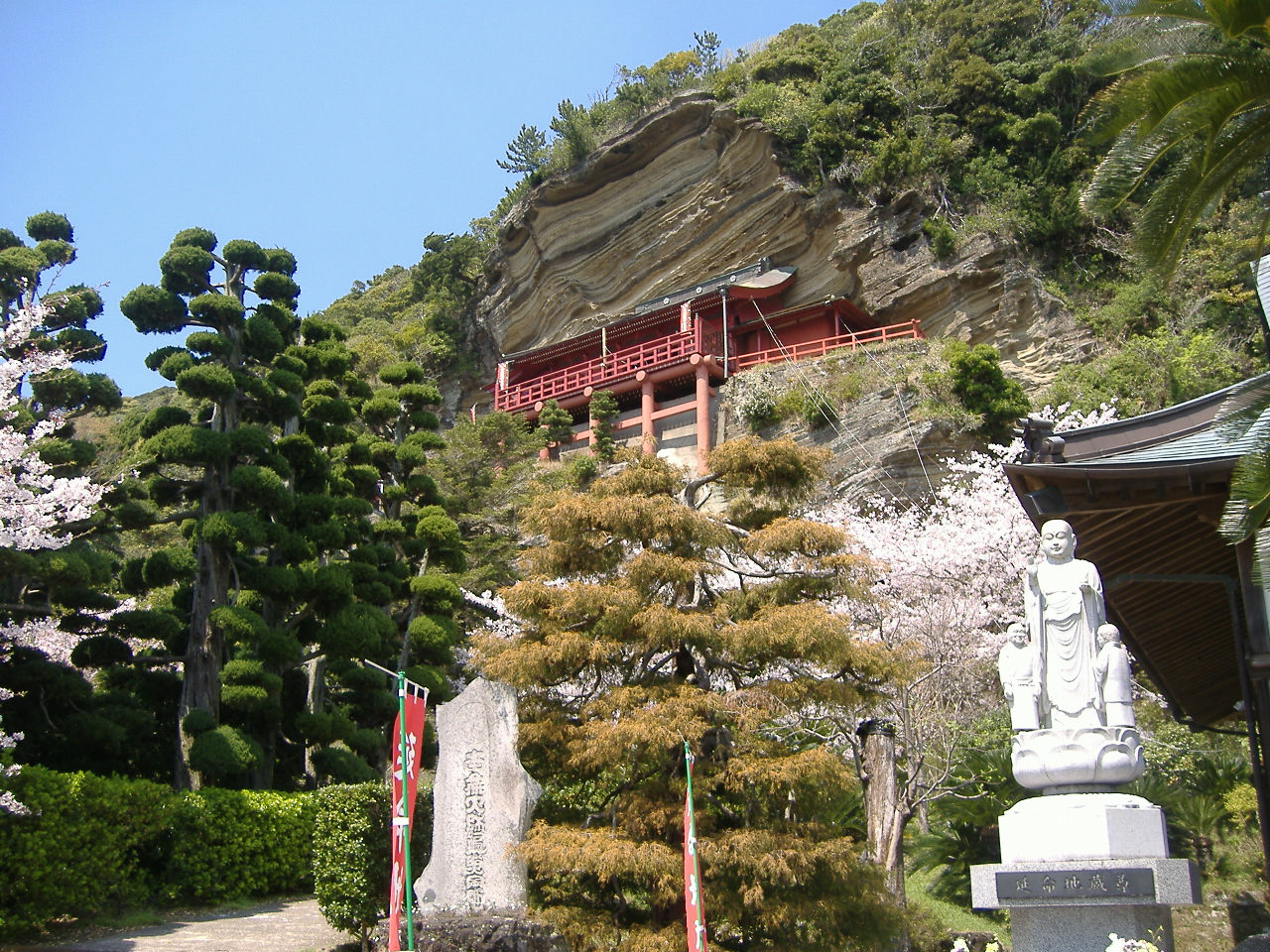
- Kannon Hall (観音堂, Kannon-dō) of Daifuku-ji

Religion
- Affiliation: Buddhism
- Deity: Eleven-Faced Kannon
- Rite: Chizen Sect of Shingon Buddhism

Location
- Location: 835 Funakata Tateyama, Chiba Prefecture
- Country: Japan
- Interactive map of Daifuku-ji 大福寺
- Coordinates: 35°1′50.26″N 139°50′29.50″E

Architecture
- Completed: 717

Daifuku-ji (大福寺) is a Buddhist temple in the Japanese city of Tateyama in Chiba Prefecture, pertaining to the Chizen Sect of Shingon Buddhism. According to tradition, the temple was founded by Gyōki (668–749) in 717, early in the Nara period. It was later revived by a visit by the Tendai Buddhist priest Ennin (794–864), early in the Heian period. The date at which the temple returned to the Shingon sect is unknown. The establishment received a juinjō (朱印状) seal of certification from the Tokugawa shogunate during the Edo period.

== Kannon-dō ==
The temple is well known for its Kannon Hall (観音堂, kannondō) hall dedicated to the Goddess Kannon, which is situated on a sheer cliff of the boat-shaped Mount Funakata. For this reason the Kannon-dō is also known as the Cliff Kannon-dō Gake no Kannon-dō (崖の観音). In the rear of the hall is a 1.5-meter-tall (4.9 ft) statue of the Goddess Kannon. The Kannon-dō is designated as a Tangible Cultural Property by Tateyama City.

== Transportation ==
Daifuku-ji is located in the Funakata District of Tateyama. It is accessible by foot from Nakofunakata Station, JR East Uchibō Line.

A few scenes of Daifuku-ji temple, 2017

== Sources ==
- "Daifuku-ji Kannon-dō". Japan Knowledge Maruchimedia (Japan Knowledge マルチメディア “Japan Knowledge Multimedia”). Tokyo: Netto Adobansusha. 2011. Archived from the original on 2007-08-25.
- 大福寺(崖の観音) (in Japanese)
