= Kokonoe Station =

Railway station in Tateyama, Chiba Prefecture, Japan

Kokonoe Station 九重駅
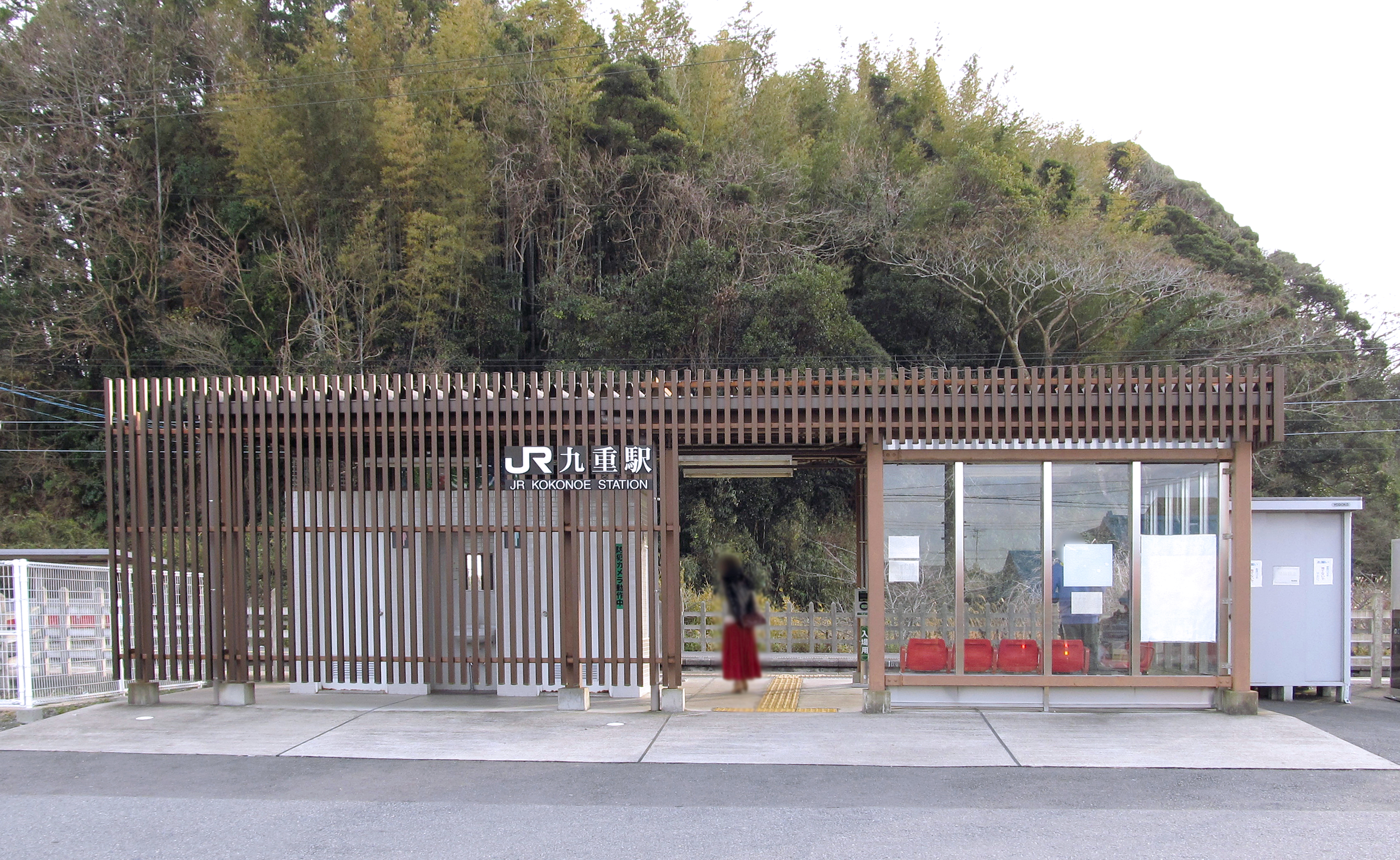
- Kokonoe Station in December 2013

General information
- Location: Futago 93, Tateyama-shi, Chiba-ken 294-0011; Japan
- Coordinates: 34.9974°N 139.9111°E
- Operator: JR East
- Line: ■ Uchibō Line
- Distance: 91.7 km from Soga
- Platforms: 2 side platforms

Other information
- Status: Unstaffed
- Website: Official website

History
- Opened: June 1, 1921

Passengers
- FY2006: 103

Services
| Preceding station | JR East | Following station |
|---|---|---|
| Tateyama towards Soga or Chiba | Uchibō Line Local | Chikura towards Awa-Kamogawa |
Location
- Location within Chiba Prefecture Location within Japan

Kokonoe Station (九重駅, Kokonoe-eki) is a passenger railway station in the city of Tateyama, Chiba Prefecture, Japan, operated by the East Japan Railway Company (JR East).

== Lines ==
Kokonoe Station is served by the Uchibo Line, and is located 91.7 km from the starting point of the line at Soga Station.

== Station layout ==
The station consists of two opposed side platforms serving two tracks. The station is currently unattended.

=== Platforms ===
| 1 | ■ Uchibō Line | For Tateyama, Kimitsu, Kisarazu, Chiba |
| 2 | ■ Uchibō Line | For Awa-Kamogawa |

== History ==
Kokonoe Station was opened on June 1, 1921. The station was absorbed into the JR East network upon the privatization of the Japan National Railways (JNR) on April 1, 1987. A new station building was completed in February 2007.

== Passenger statistics ==
In fiscal 2006, the station was used by an average of 103 passengers daily.

== Surrounding area ==
- Awa Regional Medical Center
- National Route 128

== See also ==
- List of railway stations in Japan
