= Chikura Station =

Railway station in Minamibōsō, Chiba Prefecture, Japan

Chikura Station 千倉駅
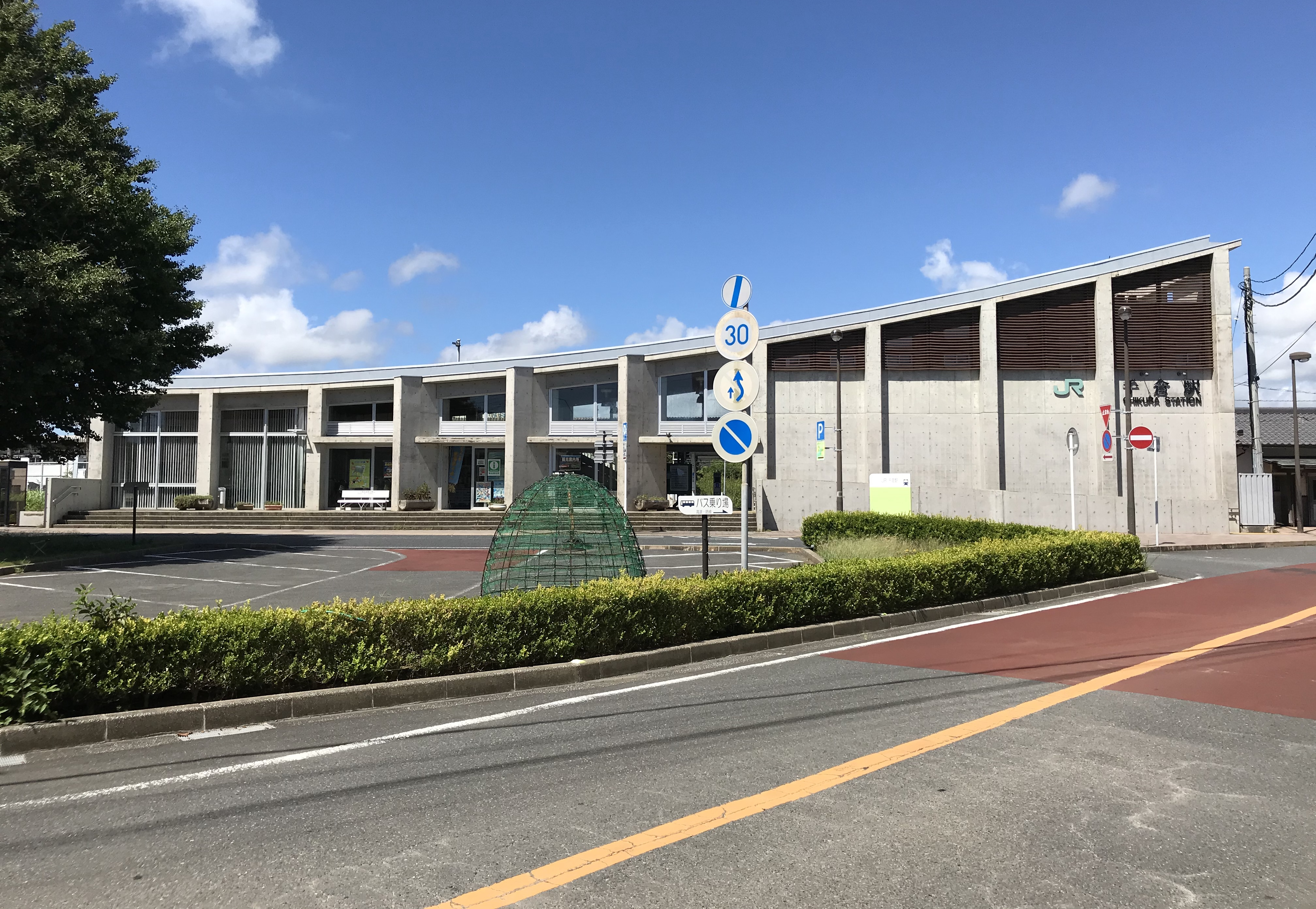
- Chikura Station in September 2020

General information
- Location: 2079 Chikura-chō Seto, Minamibōsō-shi, Chiba-ken 295-0004; Japan
- Coordinates: 34°58′36.16″N 139°57′17.2″E
- Operator: JR East
- Line: ■ Uchibō Line
- Distance: 96.6 km from Soga
- Platforms: 1 side + 1 island platforms

Other information
- Status: Staffed
- Website: Official website

History
- Opened: June 1, 1921

Passengers
- FY2019: 338

Services
| Preceding station | JR East | Following station |
|---|---|---|
| Kokonoe towards Soga or Chiba | Uchibō Line Local | Chitose towards Awa-Kamogawa |
Location
- Location within Chiba Prefecture Location within Japan

Chikura Station (千倉駅, Chikura-eki) is a passenger railway station in the city of Minamibōsō, Chiba Prefecture, Japan, operated by the East Japan Railway Company (JR East).

== Lines ==
Chikura Station is being served by the Uchibō Line, a railway line operated by the East Japan Railway Company. The station is located 96.6 km from the terminus of the line at Soga Station.

== Station layout ==
The station consists of one side platform and one island platform serving three tracks, connected to the station building by a footbridge. The station has a staffed ticket office and a local tourist information desk.

=== Platforms ===
| 1 | ■ Uchibō Line | for Tateyama, Kimitsu, Kisarazu, and Chiba |
| 2 | ■ Uchibō Line | for Awa-Kamogawa |
| 3 | ■ Uchibō Line | for Tateyama, Kimitsu, Kisarazu, and Chiba |

== History ==
Chikura Station opened on June 1, 1921. The station was absorbed into the JR East network upon the privatization of the Japan National Railways (JNR) on April 1, 1987. A new station building was completed in February 2007.

== Passenger statistics ==
In fiscal 2019, the station was used by an average of 338 passengers daily (boarding passengers only).

== Surrounding area ==
- Chikura fishing port
- former Chikura Town Hall
- National Route 410

== See also ==
- List of railway stations in Japan
