= List of Ultraman Max characters =

This is the character list for the 2005–06 Ultra Series, Ultraman Max. The series took place in the 21st century, featuring a different world where older elements of the Shōwa era Ultra Series appear in addition to new elements in the Heisei era.

== UDF ==
=== DASH ===
The Japanese branch of UDF operated in Base Titan (ベース・タイタン, Bēsu Taitan) and is located in the Tokyo Bay. The anti-monster team DASH (ダッシュ, Dasshu; Defense Action Squad Heroes) was formed from the elite members of UDF that were trained in both physical strength and mental intelligence. Although facing monsters within the range of 24 hours a day, their normal operating hours started on 10:00 am. In battle, they deploy the use of DASH Mother (ダッシュマザー, Dasshu Mazā) mobile carrier and DASH Bird (ダッシュバード, Dasshu Bādo) aircraft, the latter with three existing models per combat situations. For road patrol purposes, members can ride on either DASH Alfa (ダッシュアルファ, Dasshu Arufa) car or DASH-Ducati (ダッシュドゥカ, Dasshu Duka) motorcycle.

Members

- Shigeru Hijikata (ヒジカタ・シゲル, Hijikata Shigeru): The 39 year old captain of DASH, who commands the operation from Base Titan. Although usually strict and disciplined, he also has a surprising side, such as affinity for rock music and prone to accept challenges from Alien Shamer and Moetaranga. He is portrayed by Kai Shishido (宍戸 開, Shishido Kai). Although not mentioned in the story, Shishido believed that Hijikata is a divorced father with a daughter, due to holding his family picture in episode 7.
- Kenjiro Koba (コバ・ケンジロウ, Koba Kenjirō): The team's marksman with dual wielding DASH Rizer pistols and is a foil to the stoic android Elly. He is portrayed by Nobuyuki Ogawa (小川 信行, Ogawa Nobuyuki).
- Mizuki Koishikawa (コイシカワ・ミズキ, Koishikawa Mizuki): The ace pilot and token female member. Despite her brash attitude, she is an expert in rescue missions and is capable of cooking. As revealed in episode 37, Mizuki is a descendant of the Alien Saton race, but choose to acknowledge herself as a human, having raised on Earth and devoted to its culture. In the penultimate episode, Mizuki's body reached her life expectancy due to constant injuries she suffered from her service as a DASH member. The stresses she suffered reach its limits and died in the Delos civilization, but Kaito was able resuscitate her to life, an act that eventually changed the underground-dwelling race's opinion on mankind. After the final battle, she married Kaito and was last seen in year 2076 observing her descendants leaving for outer space. She is portrayed by Hitomi Hasebe (長谷部 瞳, Hasebe Hitomi), and was planned to be named Akane, after the character from Godzilla Against Mechagodzilla.
- Sean White (ショーン・ホワイト, Shōn Howaito): The team inventor/scientist/joker. He was transported from the DASH North American branch. He is portrayed by Sean Nichols (ショーン・ニコルス, Shōn Nikorusu), who is also the basis of his character's first name.
- Elly (エリー, Erī): The gynoid operator and analyzer, who is always seen alongside the mascot robot Coco (ココ, Koko). She develops interest in human emotions and occasionally displayed one as such, which includes a growing interest in Kenjiro Koba. Elly remains functional even 70 years after Max's departure, witnessing future cadets of UDF leaving for outer space. She is portrayed by Hikari Mitsushima (満島 ひかり, Mitsushima Hikari) and is modeled after the android Komachi from episode 17 of Ultra Q: Dark Fantasy.
- Kaito Touma (トウマ・カイト, Tōma Kaito): The team's latest recruit and the main protagonist of the series. Born on August 30, he is aged 23 years old and later 24 as of episode 8. After losing his parents from an earthquake while he was traveling abroad, Kaito resolved to do his best to protect others and participated as a private emergency volunteer so that no one would experience the loss he did. In order to do this he tried joining DASH, but failed the test the first time. He was saved by Ultraman Max from a certain death and was given the Max Spark to transform whenever needs arose. Ever since then, he was approved of his membership in DASH and learned not to be prideful in the Ultra's power. After the final battle against Giga Berserke, the two separated as Kaito promised to Max that humans would hold onto the future by their own hands. Years later, Kaito married Mizuki and the elderly couple bare witness of their grandchildren departing to Nebula M78. He is portrayed by Sōta Aoyama (青山 草太, Aoyama Sōta) and was originally planned to be named as Hayate (ハヤテ).

=== Other UDF members ===
The United Defense Federation (地球防衛連合, Chikyū Bōei Rengō; UDF) is an international organization established by the United Nations to deal with monsters and alien invaders that appeared due to frequent natural disasters in various parts of the world in the 21st century. As the main headquarters is in Paris, France, there are other 11 branches across the world, with Japan being one of them.

- Kenzo Tomioka (トミオカ・ケンゾウ, Tomioka Kenzō): UDF chief and the supervisor of DASH. He was previously the deputy commander of the United Nations Peacekeeping Force and chief of staff of the Strategic Self Defense Force. In his younger days, Tomioka was once a talented pilot and even had an old colleague in Dr. Date and archaeologist Ozaki. He is portrayed by Susumu Kurobe (黒部 進, Kurobe Susumu), whose previously known for his role as Shin Hayata in Ultraman. This is also referenced once in episode 31 when Kenzo raised his pruning shears in the same manner as Hayata's Beta Capsule.
- Yukari Yoshinaga (ヨシナガ・ユカリ, Yoshinaga Yukari): A monster ecologist who investigates their target's (monster and alien) behavior. Before enrolling into the defense force, a young Yoshinaga was a cast member of the popular horror series Unbalance, under the pseudonym Hiroko Sakuragi (桜木 弘子, Sakuragi Hiroko). She is portrayed by Hiroko Sakurai (桜井 浩子, Sakurai Hiroko), who was previously the actress for Yuriko Edogawa in Ultra Q and Akiko Fuji in Ultraman. As the young actor Hiroko Sakuragi in episode 29, she is portrayed by Hiromi Eguchi (江口 ヒロミ, Eguchi Hiromi).
- Dr. Date (ダテ博士, Date-hakase): An old veteran and colleague of Tomioka and Yoshinaga. He managed the Base Poseidon and participated in the creation of DASH Bird 3. Initially a one-shot character, Date made several appearances throughout the series to assist DASH and UDF officers of Base Titan. When Delos issued a war on humanity and unleash their Berserke System towers, Dr. Date was able to get the entire faculty of Base Poseidon evacuated before it was destroyed. He is portrayed by Masanari Nihei (二瓶 正也, Nihei Masanari), previously the actor of Mitsuhiro Ide in Ultraman and Hiroaki Tobe's voice actor in The Ultraman.

== Ultramen ==
The only Ultramen that appear in this series were Max and Xenon. In the semi-canon episode 24, Ultraseven is all but hinted to have been active in the past in against Alien Metron. According to the Ultraman Max official website, both of them were said to be hailed from "somewhere in Nebula M78" without hinting the actual planet, but the official website of Tsuburaya Productions directly listed their birthplace as the Land of Light (光の国, Hikari no Kuni), which is also shared with the past Showa Era Ultra Series.

=== Ultraman Max ===
Ultraman Max (ウルトラマンマックス, Urutoraman Makkusu) is the titular Ultra Warrior of the series. Hailing from Nebula M78, Max is a Civilization Guardian (文明監視員, Bunmei Kanshin-in) sent to study civilizations throughout the galaxy, with Earth being his most recent assignment. Despite his policy of not interfering with the affairs of other civilizations, Max bonds with Kaito after sensing his bravery during the battle against Lagoras and Grangon, after which the two join forces to protect humanity against monsters and invaders. His activity on Earth is limited to three minutes, with the Power Timer (パワータイマー, Pawā Taimā) on his chest flashing red when his energy is close to running out. His mind does not integrate with Kaito's, meaning the two can communicate with each other on certain occasions. When the Delos people declare war on humanity and release the Giga Berserke, Max is prohibited from acting due to his people's laws regarding interfering with other civilizations. However, after Kaito's selflessness changes the Delos' view of humanity, Max agrees to fight the Giga Berserke, being killed in the process. He is revived through DASH's efforts and defeats the machine before leaving Earth.

Kaito transforms into Ultraman Max by using the Max Spark (マックススパーク, Makkusu Supāku), which is mounted on his left forearm in Ultra form and allows him to execute the Maxium Cannon (マクシウムカノン, Makushiumu Kanon) as his finishing move. Max displays great physical strength and is known as the fastest Ultra from M78. Max is also able to increase his height to gargantuan sizes and multiply himself seemingly endlessly, though these techniques consume his energy quickly and reduce his time limit to one minute. In the final battle against Giga Berserke, the massive amount of solar energy he absorbs through the Max Galaxy is enough to allow him to easily enlarge himself to 900 meters.

His other weapons include:

- Maxium Sword (マクシウムソード, Makushiumu Sōdo): A space boomerang that is stored on his head crest, which he can either throw or wield as a dagger-like weapon. He can also multiply it once thrown.
- Max Galaxy (マックスギャラクシー, Makkusu Gyarakushī): An item obtained from Ultraman Xenon during his fight with Zetton. Max wears it on his right hand to execute various enhanced finishers such as the Galaxy Cannon (ギャラクシーカノン, Gyarakushī Kanon).

Ultraman Max is voiced by Kazuya Nakai (中井 和哉, Nakai Kazuya). In episode 34, Ultraman Max's clones are voiced by Isao Teramoto (寺本 勲, Teramoto Isao).

=== Ultraman Xenon ===
Ultraman Xenon (ウルトラマンゼノン, Urutoraman Zenon; 13, 39) is Ultraman Max's superior, arriving on Earth during the battle with Zetton to assist Max. He is also the original owner of the Max Galaxy and allows Max to keep it once the battle is over. He later returns to escort Max back to M78 after the battle with Giga Berserke. Xenon can perform the Xenonium Cannon (ゼノニウムカノン, Zenoniumu Kanon) finisher and is able to summon and use the Max Galaxy.

Ultraman Xenon is voiced by Osamu Ryutani (龍谷 修武, Ryūtani Osamu), who is previously the voice actor of Ultraman Justice in Ultraman Cosmos sequel movies.

== Other characters ==
- Miu Hayama (葉山 美宇, Hayama Miu; 2): A lone office worker manipulated into Eleking's servant. She is portrayed by Saori Amakawa (天川 紗織, Amakawa Saori).
- Mitsugu Shindō (進藤 貢, Shindō Mitsugu; 5,6): An archaeologist who accompanied the treasure hunter Kenji. After Kenji's death, the hunter found himself joining DASH members in order to escape the Subject Phantom island. He is portrayed by Yukijirō Hotaru (螢 雪次朗, Hotaru Yukijirō).
- Kenji Niimi (新見 健児, Nīmi Kenji; 5): A greedy treasure hunter who attempted to kidnap Pigmon after his arrival on Subject Phantom, going as far as sabotaging the DASH Bird 1 when DASH members arrived for inspection. When Salamadon appeared and tried to attack him, Kenji escaped and left Mitsugu behind, only for his helicopter to crash after being hit by the monster's spikes. Aside from being killed, he inadvertently undo the seal of Red King by accidentally damaging the Pigmon. He is portrayed by Atsushi Narasaka (奈良 坂篤, Narasaka Atsushi), previously portraying the naval officer Saijo in Ultraman Cosmos.
- Unnamed girl (9): The unnamed girl was the spirit of a deceased Natsukawa villager from 20 years prior to the series. She appeared to Kaito and plead him to stop the villagers from angering Natsunomeryu. During the monster's fight with Ultraman Max, she stopped the fight between two giants and passed on to afterlife as the Ultra quell Natsunomeryu's anger. She is portrayed by Merii Ajima (安島 芽里衣, Ajima Merii).
- Masayuki (マサユキ; 10): A young boy who, alongside his circle of friends paid their visit to DASH. His initial amazement for the team turned sour after their fight with Metacisus, which the boy managed to discover its exact movement through his cellphone. Eventually his actions allow DASH and Ultraman Max to turn the tides of the battle and regaining his admiration for the attack team. He is portrayed by Reo Kurihara (栗原 玲央, Kurihara Reo).
- Yuri Sakata (坂田 由里, Sakata Yuri; 11): The daughter of the late Baraji civilization researcher, Yuichi. Yuri harbors a strong vendetta against those who humiliated her father's researches and denied DASH the blue stone of Baraji. After rescuing a victim, she gave the stone under her late father's wish, allowing Ultraman Max to defeat the monster. She is portrayed by Ayako Fujitani (藤谷 文子, Fujitani Ayako).
- Bad Scanners (バッドスキャナーズ, Baddo Sukyanāzu; 12): A popular rock band whose concert was threatened by Halen's arrival. Encouraged by DASH members, the group played their music to distract Halen, long enough for Max to kill it and finally allowed to continue the concert uninterrupted. The band members are portrayed by real life members of Japanese band ACTION.
- Natsumi Oda (小田 夏美, Oda Natsumi; 13, 14): A young girl that inherited the Zetton Nano DNA from an Alien Zetton, giving her prodigious abilities since her childhood. Despite wanting to live a normal life, the Alien Zetton hijacked her body to infiltrate Base Titan, sending King Joe to Earth at the time of Zetton's rampage. When King Joe unveiled itself, Natsumi was brainwashed into its pilot and coerced by the Alien Zetton to murder Kaito, instead killing her genetic progenitor to live a normal life. She is portrayed by Nao Nagasawa (長澤 奈央, Nagasawa Nao) and Hihori Sawanobori (澤登 ひほり, Sawanobori Hihori) as a child.
- Akko (アッコ; 15): A blind girl whose supposedly perform in a concert that was ruined by If's rampage. Bravely confronting the monster, Akko played her flute to ease its rampage and in turn managed to lure If away from Earth with Max's help. She is portrayed by Mao Sasaki (佐々木 麻緒, Sasaki Mao), whose appearance in the series is due to her long time experience with the director, Takashi Miike.
- Takeru Ozaki (オザキ タケル, Ozaki Takeru; 19): A longtime companion of Kenzo Tomioka from their early days in the defense force. He is portrayed by Kohji Moritsugu (森次 晃嗣, Moritsugu Kōji), whose previously known for the role of Dan Moroboshi in Ultra Seven.
- Yamaguchi family (20): The Yamaguchi family are the viewpoint character in episode 20, consisting of the patriarch Takeo (武雄), matriarch Hatsuko (初子), eldest daughter Misato (美里) and youngest son Takashi (孝). As a result of Cloudos' appearance, Takeo and Misato assisted DASH in securing the Enoki area from making noises until Max's attempt to fight the monster, bumping into Hatsuko and Takashi in the middle of their recreation. After the battle, the family gave the DASH members shiitake mushrooms as parting gift. They are portrayed by Joe Onodera (小野寺 丈, Onodera Jō), Miyoko Yoshimoto (芳本 美代子, Yoshimoto Miyoko), Ayako Yoshiya (吉谷 彩子, Yoshiya Ayako) and Kazuya Sugitani (杉谷 和哉, Sugitani Kazuya).
- Kanami Miyahara (宮原 香波, Miyahara Kanami; 21): A journalist who lost her mother at an early age. Her late father, Kazuma Uno (宇野 一馬, Uno Kazuma), was a GSTE member that participated in the biological remodeling of Gomora into a fierce breed of bio-weapon to be unleashed against humanity. She joined DASH in order to discover her father's whereabouts but found the GSTE's hideout alongside captain Hijikata alongside Uno's diary, leading to the conclusion that her father is beyond redemption and that the giant Gomora needed to be killed. After the battle, although evidence of Fridnya's participation in the terrorist group was buried, Kanami sworn to expose their conspiracy in the future. She is portrayed by Tomoko Ōtakara (大寶 智子, Ōtakara Tomoko).
- Ikuo Hasunuma (蓮沼 征夫, Hasunuma Ikuo; 22): The scriptwriter for the in-universe episode of Ultraman Max. Ikuo constantly dreamed of encountering with Tsuburaya Productions' monster sculptor while switching places with Kaito but realized too late that he was lead into writing for Madeus' victory. With their places switched, Kaito wrote the script while Ikuo took the former's place in becoming Ultraman Max and fought Madeus. He is portrayed by Renji Ishibashi (石橋 蓮司, Ishibashi Renji).
- Detective Narasaki (楢崎刑事, Narasaki-keiji; 24): A local detective who investigated the strange cases of humans turning mad from flip phones. It was later revealed to be the work of Alien Metron, as young Narasaki and his father previously nursed the alien to health after his defeat from Ultraseven. He is portrayed by Naomasa Musaka (六平 直政, Musaka Naomasa) and Kenta Fujiwara (藤原 健太, Fujiwara Kenta) as a young boy.
- Kakeru (駈; 25): A teenager that befriended Alien Neril "Keef". He is portrayed by Ōta Tanino (谷野 欧太, Tanino Ōta).
- Dr. Kori (古理博士, Kori-hakase; 26): The infamous researcher, whose theory of Unizin was debunked by many scientists. As a 12-year-old child, he caught a glimpse of its presence in Japan and had since tracked the monster's movement, with the recent being Ireland a dozen years prior to the series. After repairing Elly due to an accident she experienced, he acquired the android's help in stealing several items across the town in order to create a trap for said monster and imprison Unizin into an ancient Egyptian crystal. After removing the trap meant for said monster, he was given an idesia as a parting gift. He is portrayed by Hiroshi Inuzuka (犬塚 弘, Inuzuka Hiroshi) and Naoki Watanabe (渡辺 直樹, Watanabe Naoki) as a young child.
- Kenji Sahashi (佐橋 健二, Sahashi Kenji; 29): Originally the lead actor of Unbalance in 40 years prior to the series, alongside Yasuhiko and Hiroko (Yoshinaga), Kenji participated in the filming that lead to a rescue mission of a filming crew and a fight against Geronga. Unfortunately the incident was kept secret since then as Kenji turned his focus as a sci-fi writer. In the present day, he re-discovered Geronga while in the middle of an interview by the television. After Geronga was sent back to the Okutama, the three Unbalance alumni reunite. He is portrayed by Kenji Sahara (佐原 健二, Sahara Kenji) and Hideki Okada (岡田 秀樹, Okada Hideki) in his younger years.
- Yasuhiko Saigō (西郷 保彦, Saigō Yasuhiko; 29): One of the three Unbalance actors for its protagonists. Yasuhiko dealt a blow on Geronga's right fang, causing the monster to abandon the humans and retreated to the depths of Okutama. 40 years later, Yasuhiko runs a cafe and his memory of his past gave Max the opportunity to slice Geronga's left fang. He is portrayed by Yasuhiko Saijō (西條 康彦, Saijō Yasuhiko) and Masahiko Katayama (片山 雅彦, Katayama Masahiko) as a young actor.
- Tsutomu Ichinose (一ノ瀬 勉, Ichinose Tsutomu; 33, 34): A young boy living at the coastal area, his sighting of a sea monster lead to being labelled as the "lying boy" (嘘つき少年, Usotsuki Shōnen) by the townspeople. One day, Tsutomu met the Tiny Baltan, asking his help in preparation for the invasion of Dark Baltan and to contact the DASH headquarters. He is portrayed by Koushin Ikeda (池田 晃信, Ikeda Kōshin).
- Police officer (33, 34): The unnamed policeman of a coastal area. He is portrayed by Ryū Manatsu (真夏 竜, Manatsu Ryū), previously portraying Gen Ootori in Ultraman Leo.
- Security guard (33): An unnamed security guard in the vicinity of Tokyo. Through Tiny Baltan's powers, he flew several paper planes out of amusement, allowing them to remain flying for indefinite amount of time. He is portrayed by Sandayū Dokumamushi (毒蝮 三太夫, Dokumamushi Sandayū), previously the actor of Daisuke Arashi in Ultraman and Shigeru Furuhashi in Ultra Seven.

== Monsters and Aliens ==
=== Showa series reprisals ===
- Discharge Dragon Eleking (放電竜 エレキング, Hōden Ryū Erekingu; 2, 27): A variation of the original Eleking from episode 3 of Ultra Seven, evidenced by the differently shaped hands. The "Discharge Dragon" has the ability to feed on electricity and human brainwaves, as well as brainwashing a selected human as protector in their defenseless diminutive forms.
  - Episode 2: Hailing from outer space, the first Eleking is a monster which feed on the electrical supply in the city at night and brainwashed a lone office lady Miu Hayama as its servant for hiding during the daylight. Eleking shrunk itself into a container and produced another of its kind before the monster left Miu to feed on electricity until Ultraman Max severed its right horn and opened fire using the Maxium Cannon.
  - Episode 27: At some point before the New Year's Eve, the Alien Pitt duo were revealed to have artificially recreated Eleking from its larva form in akin to an eel. Several of these larvae Eleking were reported to feed on human brainwaves. While Kaito and Mizuki were investigating in an apartment complex, the two were knocked down by a pair of Alien Pitt and the particular larva was subsequently captured. The larva manipulated Mizuki into escaping from Base Titan while a giant Eleking was released in area JT544. Kaito removed the larva from Mizuki as it proceed to return to the Alien Pitt saucer. After regaining the Max Spark to transform, Max defeated the giant Eleking in its attempt to escape from Earth.
- Armored Monster Red King (装甲怪獣 レッドキング, Sōkō Kaijū Reddo Kingu; 5, 6, 36): First appeared in episode 8 of Ultraman.
  - Episodes 5 and 6: An evil monster from Subject Phantom island that was sealed by a preceding Pigmon by petrifying itself into a statue. When Salamadon shot down a treasure hunter's helicopter, the vehicle crashed the Pigmon statue and caused Red King to return, as well as driving the Subject Phantom island in a collision course with Boso Peninsula. Aside from its armored skin and reliance of brute strength, Red King's body contains explosive rocks from the Subject Phantom which it used to spit onto the opponent. Upon awakening, Red King defeated Salamadon and proceed to target Pigmon before Max appeared and bury the monster underground. After replenishing its strength, the Red King resurfaced to fight against Paragler and Ultraman Max, wherein the red giant tricked Red King into depleting its supply of explosive rocks before dragging it to outer space for Max to kill him in a safe detonation.
  - Episode 36: Another Red King was summoned from the Subject Phantom's dimension by Alien Shamer, wanting to use the monster as a distraction to lure Max. The brutish monster was chosen for its low intellect and easy to be manipulated. After disappearing, Shamer summoned it again to wreak havoc and fight the Ultraman, narrowly avoiding the alien's teleportation gun and was killed via the Max Galaxy. Due to the content of explosive rocks like the previous one, Max managed to trap Red King in a barrier to spare the entire city from its detonation.
- Cyber Monster Pigmon (電脳珍獣 ピグモン, Den'nō Chinjū Pigumon; 5, 6, 36): artificial intelligences created by then-inhabitants of Subject Phantom island. The previous Pigmon's statue was destroyed when a treasure hunter's helicopter crashed it, which lead to the appearance of Red King. The second Pigmon which befriended Kaito and Mizuki took its predecessor's place by petrifying itself and teleported the entire Subject Phantom away from Earth. In episode 36, the second Pigmon was summoned to Earth alongside Red King by accident due to a surviving Alien Shamer's part. This Pigmon assimilated to Elly by accident when Shamer try to assault DASH with its teleportation gun. The Pigmon-possessed Elly followed Mizuki to find Shamer, where it took the hit from the beam meant for Max, therefore splitting from the android and was sent back to its home dimension.
- Magnetic Monster Antlar (磁力怪獣 アントラー, Jiryoku Kaijū Antorā; 11): An antlion monster that was said to have destroyed the entire civilization of Baraji in 4,000 years prior to the series. In the present day, Antlar attacked an entire city and induces a magnetic storm that disabled DASH's communication system. The late researcher Yuichi had long prophesied its arrival from his study of Baraji civilization and entrusted his daughter Yuri with the blue stone of Baraji, which Koba would put to use on DASH Deringer to disable Antlar, allowing Max to destroy the monster with Maxium Cannon. First appeared in episode 7 of Ultraman.
- Space Dinosaur Zetton (宇宙恐竜 ゼットン, Uchū Kyōryū Zetton; 13): A variation of the original Zetton from episode 39 of Ultraman. This version of Zetton is visually the same as its original incarnation but taller in body height and possesses the ability to initiate the impregnable barrier Zetton Shutter (ゼットンシャッター, Zetton Shattā). The Zetton came close to defeat Max and DASH members until the timely arrival of Xenon, who delivers the Max Galaxy and allows the Ultra to kill Zetton with Galaxy Cannon.
- Transforming Phantom Alien Zetton (変身怪人 ゼットン星人, Henshin Kaijin Zetton Seijin; 13, 14): An invader who implanted the Zetton Nano DNA (ゼットン・ナノ遺伝子, Zetton Nano Idenshi) into mankind since 8,000 BC until it matured into the human named Natsumi Yamada, transforming her into a prodigy. Zetton possessed her into his personal soldier to infiltrate DASH headquarters, destroying their defense satellite for Zetton and King Joe to arrive on Earth. When Max managed to defeat both monsters, the alien trapped Kaito into the Zetton Zone (ゼットンゾーン, Zetton Zōn) and forced Natsumi to kill him before she regained control and killed the alien with her katana. He is voiced by Yukitoshi Hori.
- Invasion Robot King Joe (侵略ロボット キングジョー, Shinryaku Robotto Kingu Jō; 14): The Alien Zetton's second invasion weapon from his home planet. Once infiltrating the Earth atmosphere as four separate alien ships, King Joe reduced its size to disguise itself as a robot mascot to a group of children before DASH exposed its deception. Reverted to its giant form, the brainwashed Natsumi piloted it and fought against Max and DASH members until the Ultra rescued her for him to utilize Maxium Cannon and scrapped the robot altogether. First appeared in episode 13 and 14 of Ultra Seven.
- Ancient Monster Gomora (古代怪獣 ゴモラ, Kodai Kaijū Gomora; 21): Known as Gomorasaurus (ゴモラザウルス, Gomorazaurusu) from the Republic of Fridnya (フリドニア, Furidonia), five specimens were smuggled by terrorist organization GSTE (God Save The Earth) with the help of the aforementioned nation. 20 years later, the Gomoras escaped from GSTE's underground laboratory and attacked Kazuna Village of Nagano Prefecture, catching the attention of DASH and Kanami Miyahara to investigate into such matter. Miyahara revealed that her late father was one of GSTE members experimenting on Gomora to turn the monster gigantic and violent in order to exact annihilation on mankind. As multiple live sized Gomoras were sighted, the giant breed rampaged on said village. After Gomora used its severed tail as a meat shield from Max's Maxium Cannon, Max summoned the Max Galaxy to kill it when his energy was depleted. Its carcass would be brought back to the Republic of Fridnya, while Miyahara decided to expose the nation's conspiracy with GSTE through her own evidences. Gomora's appearance is due to a popularity contest held by Tsuburaya Productions towards the monsters and aliens from Showa Era series, the former being emerged as a winner.
- Interlocutor Alien Alien Metron (対話宇宙人 メトロン星人, Taiwa Uchūjin Metoron Seijin; 24): The very same Alien Metron from episode 8 of Ultra Seven. After his failed invasion attempt, the alien spent the rest of the 40 years on Earth while gaining a large vertical scar on his head from his fight with Ultraseven. In the present day, Metron reignite his plan on turning the humans berserk through a special wave in their flip phones. This attracted the attention of DASH, which he later lead Kaito to his home and introduce himself. After a game of rock-paper-scissors, Metron decided to leave Earth on peaceful terms after believing that it was doomed from human activities. His human form is portrayed by Minori Terada (寺田 農, Terada Minori). Although the Ultraman Max is said to be taken place in an alternate universe, the scriptwriter Yuji Kobayashi admitted that this episode was his sole exception to the rule.
- Transforming Phantom Alien Pitt (変身怪人 ピット星人, Henshin Kaijin Pitto Seijin; 27): A pair of aliens in disguise of women in dress, Pitt Reole (ピット・レオール, Pitto Reōru) and Pitt Novu (ピット・ノヴー, Pitto Novū), they recreated the previous Eleking as artificial larvae to feed on human brainwaves as part of invading Earth. When Kaito and Mizuki storm their building complex, the Pitts stole his Max Spark to prevent Ultraman Max from transforming. At night, while retrieving their Eleking larvae, Kaito used the DASH Alfa to intrude their spaceship, killing both of them with his handgun before reclaiming the Max Spark. They are portrayed by Maya Hoshino (星野 マヤ, Hoshino Maya) and Rie Mashiko (益子 梨恵, Mashiko Rie) while the Pitt race first appeared in episode 3 of Ultra Seven.
- Alien Baltan (バルタン星人, Barutan Seijin; 33, 34): A race of aliens from the extragalactic Planet Baltan (銀河系外惑星バルタン, Ginga Keigai Wakusei Barutan). As a result of a nuclear war, the Baltans were forced to evolve to survive in their planet and split into two different factions, the peaceful conservative faction and the radical faction. Thanks to their scientific research, they are expert in the field of moving through space, size manipulation, gravity manipulation and rapid cloning of a single individual. The race first appeared in episode 2 of Ultraman.
  - Children from Super Scientific Alien "Tiny Baltan" (子供の超科学星人 タイニーバルタン, Kodomo no Chōkagaku Seijin Tainī Barutan): An energetic young member of the Baltan species, known for her orange exoskeleton and a member of her race's conservative faction. After scaring Tsutomu with the illusion of a sea monster, she met the boy in person to explain her mission on Earth and even assuming a human form, using the boy as her medium of communicating with DASH members while hiding from the Dark Baltan during his rampage on Earth. After a trip back to her home planet, she recruited several children to aid her by recharging Kaito's transformation into Ultraman Max and ringing her race's sacred bells to quell Dark Baltan from his warlike tendencies. Aside from her race's abilities, Tiny Baltan can convert water into crystals. She is voiced by Anzu Handa (半田 杏, Handa Anzu), also the actor for her human form.
  - Super Scientific Alien "Dark Baltan" (超科学星人 ダークバルタン, Chōkagaku Seijin Dāku Barutan): The adult member of the Baltan species and part of the radical faction. Dark Baltan wished to invade the Earth due to countless pollution and war brought by humanity, predicting that they would expand their territory to Moon and Mars as well. On Earth, he disrupted Base Titan to prevent intervention from DASH members and weakened Max with variety of tricks from his planet's scientific research, including the ability to grow into 357 meters. When Max returned with the help of Tiny Baltan, Dark Baltan and the Ultra split into a multitude of clones against each other until he was stunned by the sacred bells of his home world, now quelled of his warlike tendencies and reduced to a human form by Dr. Date's Metamorphoser. With this, Dark Baltan joined Tiny in returning to Planet Baltan. He is voiced by Usoh Ozaki (尾崎 右宗, Ozaki Usō), who is also his human form's actor. His clones are voiced by Isao Teramoto.

=== Original ===
- Lava Monster Grangon (溶岩怪獣 グランゴン, Yōgan Kaijū Gurangon; 1, 30): The very first monster in the series, it was revered as a legendary dragon that resided within the Ryugendake volcano. Its body cell imitates Earth minerals and has the 900°C Magma Core (マグマコア, Maguma Koa) on its torso that allow the monster to utilize pyrokinetic attacks. Grangon arises as a result of natural disaster and was quickly destroyed by the strategic formation of Dash Birds 1 and 2. Grangon eventually resurrected from its destruction and fought against its natural opponent Lagoras but was killed by the recent arrival of Ultraman Max when it try to perform a suicidal charge. Sometime later in episode 30, a Grangon was defeated by Lagoras, who absorbed its Magma Core to evolve. Its carcass was spotted by DASH members during their investigation on Lagoras Evo. In the original draft, Grangon was named as Ancient Monster Guralion (古代怪獣 グラリオン, Kodai Kaijū Gurarion).
- Frozen Monster Lagoras (冷凍怪獣 ラゴラス, Reitō Kaijū Ragorasu; 1): A monster that served as a natural opponent to Grangon, it possessed the ability to exhale a freezing breath of -240 degree energy beam from its mouth. Lagoras awakened from Izu Islands and marched its way to Ryugendake to fight Grangon until Ultraman Max appeared, which caused both rivals to form an uneasy alliance. Alongside Grangon, Lagoras was at the receiving end of Maxium Cannon. Sometime later in Kaito's second year of employment in DASH, another Lagoras had defeated Grangon and evolved by absorbing its rival's power. In the original draft, Lagoras was named as Deep Sea Ancient Monster Lagoras (深海古代怪獣 ラゴラス, Shinkai Kodai Kaijū Ragorasu).
  - Evolved Monster Lagoras Evo (進化怪獣 ラゴラスエヴォ, Shinka Kaijū Ragorasu Evo; 30): The evolved form of a Lagoras upon absorbing Grangon's Magma Core from defeating the monster itself. As a result, Lagoras' skin turned black and has the ability to manipulate both heat and ice into Super Thermal Ray (超温差光線, Chō nuku-sa Kōsen) that surpasses even Max's Galaxy Cannon. To defeat monster, Sean invented the AG Maser based on Lagoras Evo's attack as Mizuki and Koba strike its Magma Core, causing it to explode.
- Ancient Strange Bird Reguila (古代怪鳥 レギーラ, Kodai Kaichō Regīra; 3): A bird monster from which was revered as a deity in an ancient Mexican civilization. While flying to Japan at the speed of Mach 2.5, DASH try to intercept the monster until it escaped due to Kaito's arrogance to prove Max's presence. The monster returned from Saipan beach area and fought against Max in a heated battle before it was killed by Maxium Sword's Sword Slash. It was designed by Hiroshi Maruyama after Alien Ayros from Ultra Seven. Its flight scene was devised by Japanese animator Ichirō Itano, who was known for the Itano Circus and is also his first participation of aerial combat scene in tokusatsu.
- High-Speed Alien Alien Sran (高速宇宙人 スラン星人, Kōsoku Uchūjin Suran Seijin; 4): A race of aliens whose objective is to invade Earth as their second home while claiming to reverse the damages done by human civilization. Their main ability includes accelerating in 170 km/h, spinning to create afterimages, firing energy beams and becomes gigantic. One lone member was sent to invade the planet by riding a space saucer that disguised into a stadium. After fighting against Kaito and Mizuki, his spacecraft crash landed, forcing Sran to become giant and fight against Ultraman Max. Once the Ultra foil his illusory technique, he kills Sran with Maxium Cannon. He is voiced by Yasuhiko Kawazu (川津 泰彦, Kawazu Yasuhiko), and his modus operandi was written as a tribute to Alien Baltan from episode 2 of Ultraman.
- Amphibian Monster Salamadon (両棲怪獣 サラマドン, Ryōsei Kaijū Saramadon; 5): A friendly salamander monster that protects Pigmon from harm. When a pair of treasure hunters kidnapped Pigmon, it provoked Salamadon into attacking them, which lead to their helicopter crashing a Pigmon statue and awakening the sealed Red King. Salamadon attempted to fight the evil monster but was defeated and killed from the latter's brute strength.
- Gliding Monster Paragler (飛膜怪獣 パラグラー, Himaku Kaijū Paragurā; 5, 6): A purplish monster themed after a Japanese giant flying squirrel, it is capable of retracting gliders for flight purposes. Like Salamadon, Paragler's purpose is to defend Pigmon when the former was killed and almost attacked Max out of confusion before Pigmon cleared up the misunderstanding. Paragler returned to fight Red King but was killed by its barrage of explosive rocks.
- Space Agents (宇宙工作員, Uchū Kōsaku-in): A group of aliens from KJ-K5 Nebula, their mission is to destroy civilizations whose population corrode their own planet, with Earth as their next target. According to the director Kengo Kaji, the actors for Kesam and Kerus are his colleagues and were previously cast members from Kamen Rider Ryuki.
  - Kesam (ケサム, Kesamu; 7): The first of his kind to appear. Kesam has been destroying various civilizations he went to with a transportation device on his left arm and his recent target being Earth. While recovering from his injury due to the crash landing, Kesam met an injured Mizuki, who treated his wound until she discovered his evil intention. Transforming into a giant with his battle armor equipped, Kesam wrestled with Max over his civilization-destroying bomb before heavily injured by the Maxium Sword's Sword Slash. While Max try to dispose the bomb, Kesam deactivated it in his dying breath after Mizuki's words reached his mind. He is portrayed by Kenzaburo Kikuchi (菊地 謙三郎, Kikuchi Kenzaburo).
  - Kerus (ケルス, Kerusu; 32): Following Kesam's last minute defection and failure, Kerus was sent by his group to detonate Earth in the former's place. He did so by hacking/kidnapping Elly and strapped her to his computer, using her vast knowledge of UDF headquarters across the globe in order to destroy them through his missiles. As Koba rescued Elly, Kerus fought against Ultraman Max which leads to the destruction of his transporter on his left hand, which disabled the countdown of his missiles. After killing the space agent with Maxium Cannon, the Ultra would proceed to destroy his missile launcher in the orbit. He is portrayed by Ryohei (涼平, Ryōhei).
  - Kedam (ケダム, Kedamu; 32): Kerus' grunts. Unlike their master and Kesam, the Kedam combatants wore jumpsuits and protective masks while their sole weapon is a beam rifle. All agents were killed by DASH members when infiltrating Kerus' base.
- Beetle-Type Space Monster Bagdalas (甲虫型宇宙怪獣 バグダラス, Kōchū-gata Uchū Kaijū Bagudarasu; 8): (Note: Also spelt as "Bugdalas".) An asexual space insect that crash landed on Earth as a meteorite. Originally started as a larva phase, the monster quickly hatched from the meteor as a result of Yoshinaga and Sean's infrared laser. Once freed, Bugdalas prey upon almost every workers on the Base Titan for their life energy while continuously growing and prepare to reproduce its kind on Earth. The semi-gigantic Bugdalas was spotted by Kaito and Captain Hijikata, with the former uses Sean's recently developed ammo to fire upon the monster but was absorbed of his life energy, causing the monster to grow and escape. Once intercepted by DASH Bird 1, it begins to fight against Max and was killed in an attempted flying charge attack when the Ultra opened fire with his Maxium Cannon. Bugdalas' main ability is to move at a blinding speed and assuming invisibility as part of a stealth attack. By absorbing human life forms, he can grow into monstrous forms and lead its victims to a slow death. Its tentative name was Victim (ヴィクティム, Vikutimu).
- Legendary Strange Dragon Natsunomeryu (伝説怪龍 ナツノメリュウ, Densetsu Kairyū Natsunomeryū; 9): A legendary dragon that was revered by the locals, in the past Natsunomeryu attacked the village after grieving from its destruction until it was sealed within the Lake Natsukawa. In the present day, there are movements supported by the village chief's own son to build a hotel and attracting tourist, including forging a fake sighting of Natsunomeryu. Angered by the destruction of its shrine and vandalism on its village, the dragon was revived to resume rampaging as Max disabled it to put out the fires it caused. Before Max can fire his Maxium Cannon, the spirit of a deceased girl stopped the fight of both giants, explaining that Natsunomeryu's actions were only as a result of the Natsukawa Village's vandalism. Max resealed the monster as the girl peacefully passes on to afterlife. Natsunomeryu was designed with Japanese and western eclecticism.
- Spatial Transition Monster Metacisus (空間転移怪獣 メタシサス, Kūkan Ten'i Kaijū Metashisasu; 10): A mysterious monster with the ability to teleport into different locations, Metacisus destroys communication towers due to its hatred for ultra high frequency waves emitted by mobile phones. Due to DASH's vast improvements in their monster detection wave, Metacisus' presence was undetectable except for a regular mobile phone used by DASH fanboy Masayuki. The boy used this to help DASH and Max in predicting Metacisus' next teleportation area and the Ultra sliced the monster with Maxium Sword.
- Supersonic Monster Halen (超音速怪獣 ヘイレン, Heiren; 11): A bird monster with the ability to traverse at the supersonic speed of Mach 10. Its hatred for a specific sound wave causes Halen to its sources, both examples being a test jet piloted by Koba and a giant television screen that promoted the Bad Scanners' single. As Halen attacked the band's debut concert, Bad Scanners play their music under DASH's advice to distract the monster, allowing Max to finish it off with Maxium Cannon. It was named after the rock band Van Halen.
- Perfect Life-form If (完全生命体 イフ, Kanzen Seimei-tai Ifu; 15): Originally appearing from outer space, If started as a unique life form capable adapting whatever it attacked with a stronger version. As DASH members were sent to exterminate If, they realized too late that of the creature's true potential, which resulted in various evolution into a monster, eventually becoming a threat that not even Ultraman Max could handle it. The blind girl Akko played her flute in between the commotion, which caused If to retaliate by turning itself into a musical instrument-themed monster as Max escort it to outer space, away from the Earth.
- Space Cats Tama, Mike and Kuro (宇宙化猫 タマ・ミケ・クロ, Tama, Mike, Kuro; 16): A trio of space cats with the ability to induce amnesiac waves. Mike was a normal variation, with Kuro sported cat ears and Tama has a sprouted right rear leg. A month prior, the three cats initially arrived from meteorites in small sizes and burrow themselves in three different household area. As they grew to their monstrous sizes, the trio initiate a wave which causes amnesia on nearby household residents. Mike was the first to resurface and attacked Base Titan, followed by Kuro and Tama. Their amnesiac waves caused all members of DASH save Elly to forget their objectives, leaving her to instruct Ultraman Max to attack the monsters. The amnesiac Ultraman maneuvers a beam technique which splits into three attacks that hit the cats all at once, thus restoring the memories of the amnesiac victims. Their original tentative name was Kafka (カフカ, Kafuka). Originally all three of them only have different tails as distinction but the addition of a cat foot on Tama was an ad-lib by the molding department's part. Director Takashii liked the idea and even requested a pair of cat ears on Kuro.
- Ice Beauty Nina (氷の美女 ニーナ, Kōri no Bijo Nīna; 17): A member of an unnamed ancient race with similar physical traits to humanity. Her kind initially turned humans into sapient creatures as Nina was frozen in a special chamber. Fast forward to 100,000 years later, when her chamber was relocated to Base Titan, her companion monster Eraga awaken her, and lured Koba into unfreezing herself before escaping. Seeing the devastation brought by humanity to Earth, she empowered Eraga into destroying the city until she was shot down by Koba, weakening the monster for Max to kill it. Despite her dialogue and eternally youthful appearance indicated her extraterrestrial origin, she was testified by Professor Yoshinaga to be entirely human. She is portrayed by Saki Kamiryo (上良 早紀, Kamiryō Saki), who would later on portray Haruna in Ultra Galaxy Mega Monster Battle.
- Space Ancient Monster Eraga (宇宙古代怪獣 エラーガ, Uchū Kodai Kaijū Erāga; 17): A monster under Nina's ownership. When Nina was relocated to Base Titan, Eraga awakened her and was defeated by attacks from DASH Birds. It was revived into a stronger form by Nina's psychic ability and trounced Max until its master was killed, allowing the Ultra to defeat it with Galaxy Cannon.
- Illusion Alien Alien Shamer (幻影宇宙人 シャマー星人, Gen'ei Uchūjin Shamā Seijin; 18, 36): A race of hyperactive light blue aliens that rely on light to empower themselves. Their true forms are actually standing on 15 cm and will grow to human size once absorbing sunlight. Aside from individual Shamers as human forms, a giant Shamer also appeared in episode 18 to fight Max, but is ultimately revealed to be an illusion.
  - Episode 18: The first Shamer disguised as a man who introduced himself to DASH and gave them three days to surrender. At that moment, his race had built an artificial sunlight, which caused Earth to be plagued with eternal daylight and Max is incapable of fighting the giant Shamer. Once discovering their weaknesses, Max ordered Mizuki to attack their artificial sun as he stall the giant Shamer. The artificial sun's destruction resulted in the restoration of night, which caused both Shamers on Earth forcefully reduced to their diminutive forms. Their race's saucer reveal itself and was destroyed by Max's Maxium Cannon. The smaller Shamer is portrayed by Masahiro Satō (佐藤 正宏, Satō Masahiro), while the larger Shamer's comical antics were based on the titular character of Crayon Shin-chan.
  - Episode 36: Months later, another Shamer appeared disguising as Dr. Yotsuya (四谷博士, Yotsuya hakase) while offering his service to DASH. Under the guise of creating a safety mechanism for Base Titan, "Yotsuya" was actually creating a teleportation gun to summon Red King, using Base Titan's power supply and banish Ultraman Max to Subject Phantom's dimension to avenge his permanent trap on Earth. He was foiled by the Pigmon-possessed Elly and Sean, leaving the shrunken alien at the mercy of a stray cat. Dr. Yotsuya is portrayed by Toshiyuki Watarai (渡来 敏之, Watarai Toshiyuki).
- Spatial Migration Alien Alien Tarla (空間移動宇宙人 ターラ星人, Kūkan Idō Uchūjin Tāra Seijin; 19): A long time ago, the population of Planet Tarla suffered from food shortage and was forced to migrate to Earth, where they achieve a peaceful coexistence with ancient humans. Unfortunately the Tarla aliens gained leadership of Earth in order to discipline the warlike nature of humans until Ultraman Max banished them back to their planet after pointing out the error of their ways. All but one Tarla died from starvation, and the surviving member plotted his revenge by kidnapping Mizuki and kill Max/Kaito when the humans managed to reopen the Tarla's portal door. During DASH's attempt to return, Tarla tried chasing them in his final attempt before Koba thwarted him, causing the lone alien to be trapped in a dimensional rift. He is portrayed by professional wrestler Alexander Otsuka (アレクサンダー大塚, Arekuzandā Ōtsuka).
- War God Gillfas (戦神 ギルファス, Ikusagami Girufasu; 19): A stone giant from Planet Tarla that Max fought in the ancient times when the Alien Tarla announced their invasion on Earth. Like the aliens as well, Gillfas was imprisoned in his home planet and the lone Tarla intended to sacrifice Mizuki to the giant. Armed with a boomerang sword stored on his head and a shield, Gillfas fought Ultraman Max once more while Team DASH try to escape. As the shield was impenetrable to Maxium Cannon, the Ultra summoned his Max Galaxy and destroyed Gillfas with Galaxy Cannon after a long struggle.
- Subspace Monster Cloudos (亜空間怪獣 クラウドス, Akūkan Kaijū Kuraudosu; 20): From a different subspace, an unnamed sleeping monster was accidentally transported to Earth, specifically above the Yamaguchi household area. It was named by Kenzo Tomioka and has the ability to manipulate its body density. So long it remains asleep, Cloudos would stay afloat and keep the city safe. After the townsfolk cooperate to keep the area silent, DASH try to put an earplug but realized too late that its supposed ears are actually "nostrils". Max fought the monster for a while and with DASH's help, he was able to send Cloudos back to its original subspace.
- Phantom Beast Madeus (夢幻神獣 魔デウス, Mugen Shinjū Madeusu; 22): In the dream world of Ultraman Max writer Ikuo Hasunuma, a middle-aged woman wanted to create a monster that is unbeatable by any existing Ultraman. She names the monster after Deus ex machina and launch it to Kaito's world, having used Hasunuma's script to do so. With both men switched place, Hasunuma becomes Max while Kaito writes the script to turn the tides of the battle. After being consumed, Max/Hasunuma burst out to escape and said monster was engulfed in explosion.
- Flying fish Monster Flygler (飛魚怪獣 フライグラー, Tobiuo Kaijū Furaigurā; 23): A flying fish that was mutated into a 51-meter-tall (167 ft) monster. The monster is capable of traverse in mid air and underwater alike and is capable of firing high pressure stream of water from its mouth. Flygler attacked the Base Poseidon in the UDF branch of Mimos Island, leading to the debut of DASH Bird 3. On board of said jet, Tomioka opened fire on its gills, allowing Max to gain advantage and defeated Flygler with Maxium Cannon. Flygler is designed after a flying fish, a tempura and a fried shrimp.
- Friendly Alien Alien Neril "Keef" (友好異星人 ネリル星人キーフ, Neriru Seijin; 25): An alien who migrated from his dying planet to search for a new home. Arriving on Earth, he assumed the form of a famous basketball player and befriended an Earthling but discovering the past record of hostile alien invaders, he willingly turn himself to UDF, where he was subjected to torturous experimentation. When Alien Godley appeared, Keef sacrificed his life to shield Max from the evil alien at the cost of his life. He is voiced by Gamon Kaai (河相 我聞, Kaai Gamon), who is also the actor of his human form and the basketball player he modeled after. Keef was designed based on Alien Zarab from Ultraman.
- Giant Alien Alien Godley (巨大異星人 ゴドレイ星人, Kyodai Iseijin Godorei Seijin; 25): A giant evil alien bent on destroying the Earth. Godley has the ability to fire energy beams and regenerate severed limbs. The alien came close to defeating Max until Keef took the blow meant for the giant of light. Max would summon the Max Galaxy and fired the Galaxy Cannon on Godley, avenging Keef's sacrifice.
- Mythical Beast Unizin (神話の幻獣 ユニジン, Shinwa no Genjū Yunijin; 26): An illusory creature which transcends space time, Unizin is usually sighted on Earth in every 12 years during Christmas Eve. The infamous Dr. Kouri caught a glimpse of its presence in Japan as a 12-year-old boy and had since tracked the monster's movement, with the recent being Ireland a dozen years prior to the series. He gained assistance from Elly to steal several items across the town in order to create a trap for said monster and imprison Unizin into an ancient Egyptian crystal. When Unizin's capture proves a threat to the time stream, Kaito transformed into Max to prevent its power from affecting the city, while Dr. Kōri disabled the trap to free the monster. Unizin left with a branch of idesia in gratitude before parting ways.
- Ririka (リリカ; 28): An alien fugitive from Planet S-851 who fled to Earth after Luganogar killed her brethren and home planet. For two months, Ririka had slip into the human society as a babysitter but her use of healing ability on an injured boy lead to DASH and her home world's destroyer to pick up its energy signal. After Luganogar's death, Ririka thanked Kaito while keeping his double life as Ultraman Max a secret. She is portrayed by Mai Saitō (斉藤 麻衣, Saitō Mai).
- Disaster Monster Luganogar (凶獣 ルガノーガー, Kyō-jū Ruganōgā; 28): A malevolent space monster bent on destroying planets with rich energy sources, it annihilated the Planet S-851 and traced Ririka to Earth due to her use of healing powers. Luganogar fought with its reflective armor and stinger tail to drain Max of his energy. While DASH Bird fighters provide cover, Max took a discarded missile to attack the monster's unprotected backside and ended the fight with Max Galaxy's Galaxy Cannon. Luganogar's creation is a result of the winning entry from the Monster Design Contest held for the show itself, where its original name was Luganol (ルガノール, Ruganōru).
- Gyūki Monster Geronga (牛鬼怪獣 ゲロンガ, Gyūki Kaijū Geronga; 29): A monster that appeared in Okutama mountains, it was first sighted 40 years before the series and attacked the filming crews of a horror series, Unbalance. A young Yoshinaga and two other cast members bravely fought the monster, which resulted in losing its right fang and retreated to the depths of the tunnel. In the present day, Geronga had grown into the size of an average monster and rampaged in the city. After being lured away from the city by DASH members, Max fought the monster and managed to sever its left fang. Feeling guilty of the monster's loss of its fangs, Max brought it back to Okutama, where the Geronga would return to slumber. It was designed after Geronga from episode 3 of Ultraman, while the monster itself was named after an abandoned script of Ultra Q.
- Provocation Alien Moetaranga (挑発星人 モエタランガ, Chōhatsu Seijin Moetaranga; 31): An alien whose appearance is themed after a burning flame. Despite his violent tendency, Moetaranga is rather intelligent, able to understand human language through vocal and telepathy, even to the point of using honorifics. In order to invade the Planet Earth and defeat its resistances, Moetaranga spreads the Moetaranga Virus (モエタランガウイルス, Moetaranga Uirusu) to human victims and Kaito/Max, causing them to become extremely energetic but later on subjugate them to burnout syndrome. Professor Yoshinaga invented its cure, allowing Dr. Date to reverse the tides of the battle before Max kill Moetaranga with Galaxy Cannon. He is voiced by Moriya Endo (遠藤 守哉, Endō Moriya). In the original plan, Sasahiler from Return of Ultraman was meant to appear but was scrapped due to budget constraints.
- Sea Monster (海獣, Kaijū; 33): The unnamed sea monster at the beginning of the episode, its appearance frighten Tsutomu, leading to the young boy being labelled as a liar by the townspeople. In truth, it was an illusion created by Tiny Baltan as means of picking the boy's attention.
- Nebula Guardian Beast Hophop (星雲守護獣 ホップホップ, Seiun Shugo-jū Hoppuhoppu; 35): A guardian monster whose role is to protect the children Adam and Eve after the destruction of their home planet in Nebula M32. Hop Hop crash landed on Earth but lost the two cubs during its impact. Initially sleeping under the observation from DASH, Hophop woke up frantically trying to search for the missing cubs. After a brief scuffle with Max, the Ikuta siblings return Adam and Eve back to Hophop while said Ultra brought the monster to inhabit Venus.
  - Nebula Little Beasts Adam & Eve (星雲小獣 アダムとイブ, Seiun Shōjū Adamu to Ibu; 35): A pair of cub monsters from Nebula M32, they were in possession of Ikuta siblings when Hophop fell on Earth. The siblings quickly return them to Hophop, as all three of them moved to Venus through Ultraman Max's help.
- Starbem Keplus (星獣 ケプルス, Seijū Kepurusu; 37): A monster assuming the form of constellation, therefore virtually weightless and impervious to all forms of attacks. It was unleashed by the Alien Saton after being angered by Earthlings' negligence for the stars. When Mizuki managed to convince Narumiya otherwise, Keplus ceased its attack and went with Narumiya to Planet Saton.
- Starry Sky Creator Alien Saton (星空の創造主 サトン星人, Hoshizora no Sōzōnushi Saton Seijin; 37): A race of aliens that taught the Earthlings of appreciating the starry sky. Several Earthlings also inherited their gene, such as Kazunari Narumiya (成宮 和也, Narumiya Kazunari) and DASH member Mizuki. Angered that the present mankind disregard the stars, they sent Keplus to attack human civilization as Narumiya attempts to pursue Mizuki in returning to Planet Saton. However, she was able to convince the middle-aged man that mankind's lights are their sign of peace, thus ordering Keplus to cease its attack as they return to their planet. Kazunari Narumiya was portrayed by Nagare Hagiwara (萩原 流行, Hagiwara Nagare).
- Underground Civilization Delos (地底文明 デロス, Chitei Bunmei Derosu; 39): An underground civilization being whose affected negatively by human activities in the surface. In order to survive, they declared their war on humanity by destroying worldwide UDF bases, including the Base Titan and use their tower to purify oxygen to revert Earth to its original state. After witnessing Kaito's effort to revive Mizuki, the Delos people realized that they went overboard with their actions and asked for Ultraman Max to destroy their creation, Giga Berserke. With the Berserke System deactivated, Delos cease their declaration of war and return to stasis, hoping to interact with humanity in better terms in near future. The Delos people is portrayed by Shelley Swenney (シェリー・スゥエニー, Sherī Suenī) and voiced by Yuriko Yamamoto (山本 百合子, Yamamoto Yuriko).
- Mechanical Doll Auto Maton (機械人形 オートマトン, Kikai Ningyō Ōtomaton; 38): A series of machines used by Delos as their means to communicate with humans. They are voiced by Masato Hirano (平野 正人, Hirano Masato).
- Berserke System (バーサークシステム, Bāsāku Shisutemu): Delos' main technology, it refers to several atmosphere-purifying towers used to convert carbon dioxide and nitrogen into oxygen. They are also connected to robot-type machines that the Delos people used for combat.
  - Mechanical Monster Satellite Berserke (機械獣 サテライトバーサーク, Kikai-jū Sateraito Bāsāku; 38, 39): A man-sized Berserke stationing in the Delos civilization. He chokes Kaito before Mizuki threaten to detonate the Delos civilization through DASH Bird 3. He is voiced by Shinichi Yamada (山田 真一, Yamada Shin'ichi).
  - Mechanical Monster Scout Berserke (機械獣 スカウトバーサーク, Kikai-jū Sukauto Bāsāku; 38): The first Berserke unit to appear, its true purpose was to analyze the capabilities of Ultraman Max before willingly destroyed by Galaxy Cannon.
  - Mechanical Monster Giga Berserke (機械獣 ギガバーサーク, Kikai-jū Giga Bāsāku; 39): The last opponent in the series finale. Giga Berserke was simultaneously activated with the Berserke System towers and prepares to eliminate all resistance, including Ultraman Max. The Ultra was crucified and died as it held a plethora of Max's combat capabilities. When DASH members revived Max into a super gigantic proportions, the Ultra empowers his Galaxy Cannon and sliced the machine, allowing Delos to shut down their protocol.
