= Masao Kusakari =

Japanese actor and model (born 1952)

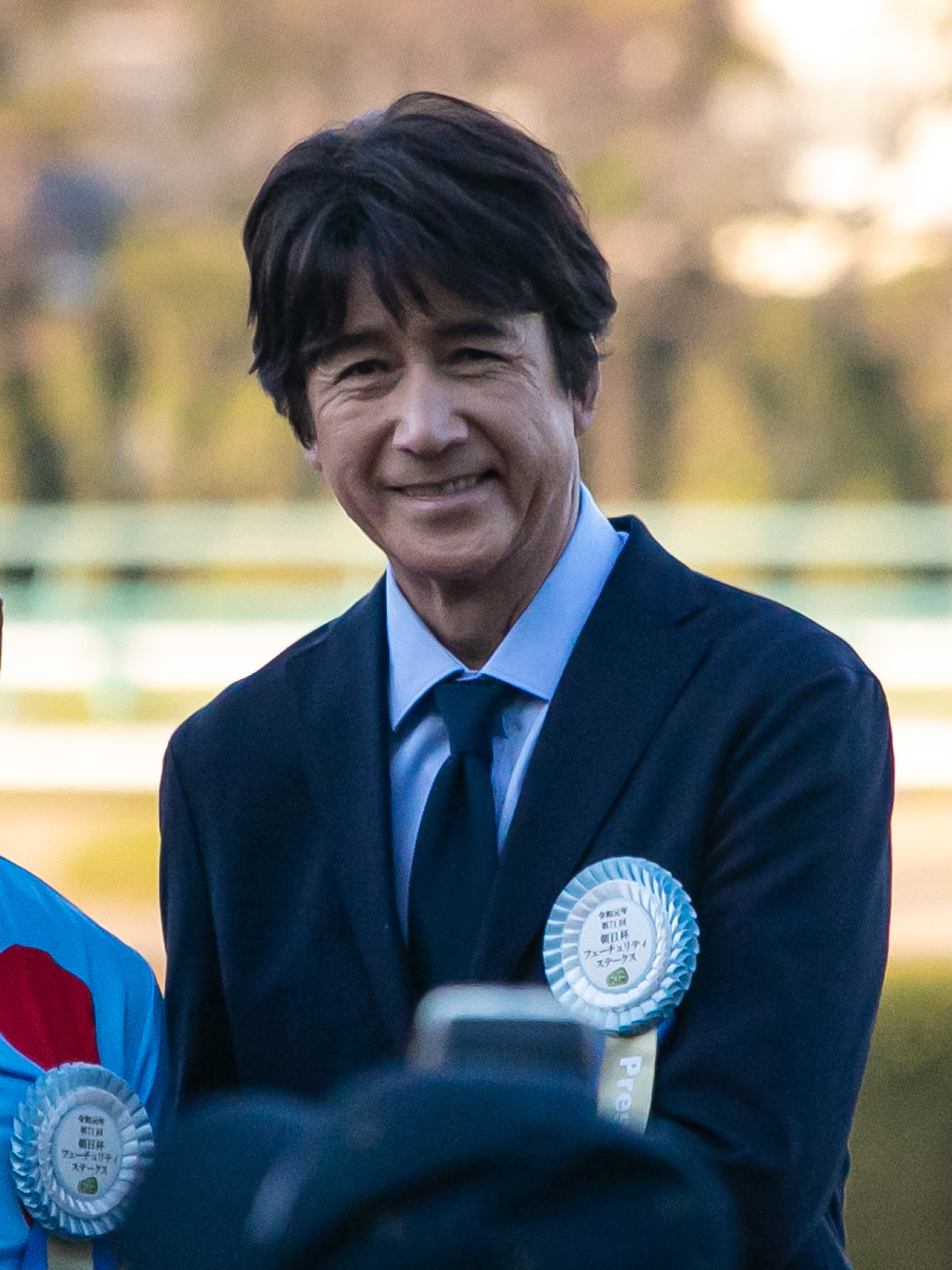
- Born: September 5, 1952 (age 73); Yukuhashi, Fukuoka, Japan
- Occupations: Actor, model
- Years active: 1970–present
- Height: 1.85 m (6 ft 1 in)
- Children: Kuran Kusakari; Mayū Kusakari

Masao Kusakari (草刈 正雄, Kusakari Masao; born September 5, 1952 in Yukuhashi, Fukuoka) is a Japanese actor and model.

== Biography ==
Masao Kusakari was born in Fukuoka Prefecture to a Japanese mother Sueko from Yukuhashi, and an American father Robert H. Tolar from Tar Heel, North Carolina, a USAF mailman who was deployed to Tsuiki Base during Korean War. Masao was told by Sueko (who died in 2010) that Robert had died in the Korean War, and he believed so, until NHK show "Family History" discovered that Robert had left Japan to move back to the US before Masao was born, then deployed to West Germany for several years as a military personnel, and later settled back in North Carolina where he died in 2013. After Masao was born, Sueko left her hometown of Yukuhashi, where there were strong prejudices against children with mixed races, then settled in Kokura (Current Kitakyushu) where she worked for multiple jobs to raise Masao. Masao also started working as early as elementary school age as a newspaper delivery boy. He started his career as a fashion model in Fukuoka when he was a high school student. Considered stunningly good looking, Masao was scouted at age 17 by a model agency in Tokyo, where his debut into the public eye began when he became a model for Shiseido Cosmetics in the early 1970's. He joined Toho in 1974 and began his career as a screen actor. He won his first major award at the Elan d'or Awards in 1975, and a year later, appeared in Kaze to Kumo to Niji to, a dream of his since early childhood to star in a taiga drama. From then to the early 1980's, Kusakari was one of the most popular actors in Japan.

He won popularity again through his role in Sanada Maru in 2016. In 2017, Kusakari won Best Supporting Actor of 10th Tokyo Drama Awards for his role in Sanada Maru. In 2019, Kusakari appeared in the Asadora Natsuzora and played an important role that has a great influence on leading character Natsu's life.

== Filmography ==
=== Film ===
Year	Title	Role	Notes	Ref.
1974	ESPY	Jirō Miki		
1974	Okita Sōji	Okita Sōji	Lead role	
1974	Himiko	Takehiko		
1975	Gambare Wakadaishō	Shōzo Umeno aka Wakadaishō	Lead role	
1976	Brother and Sister	Inokichi		
1978	Hi no Tori	Yumihiko of Matsuro		
1979	G.I. Samurai	Masakichi		
1979	Byoinzaka no Kubikukuri no Ie	Hinatsu Mokutaro		
1980	Virus	Yoshizumi	Lead role	
1981	Eijanaika	Itoman		
1982	The Last Hero	Akio Kitano	Lead role	
1984	Wangan Doro	Kensuke Sugimoto	Lead role	
1987	Horinonakano Playball	Junichi Mizuta	Lead role	
1989	Yuwakusha	Kazuhiko Sotomura		
1995	August in the Water			
1999	Hakuchi	Kogarashi		
2004	Ultraman: The Next	Manjōme		
2013	Casting Blossoms to the Sky			
2018	My Retirement, My Life	Michitarō Sano	Lead role	
2019	Hit Me Anyone One More Time	Daigo Tsurumaru		
2022	Dreaming of the Meridian Arc	The Governor of Chiba / Tokugawa Ienari		
2024	Kingdom 4: Return of the Great General	King Zhaoxiang of Qin		
2025	Emergency Interrogation Room: The Final Movie	Masanao Gōhara		
2026	The Honest Realtor: The Movie	Toshiro Tosaka		

=== Television dramas ===
Year	Title	Role	Notes	Ref.
1976	Kaze to Kumo to Niji to	Kashima no Haruaki	Taiga drama	
1981	Pro Hunter	Shunsuke Ryuzaki	Lead role	
1985	Sanada Taiheiki	Sanada Yukimura		
1994	Minami-kun no Koibito	Chiyomi's father		
1994	Hana no Ran	Hino Katsumitsu	Taiga drama	
1996	Furuhata Ninzaburō	Ken'ichirō Inui	Episode 16	
1996	Iguana Girl	Masanori Aoshima		
1997	Mōri Motonari	Katsura Hirozumi	Taiga drama	
2002	Shopping Hero			
2004	Ultra Q: Dark Fantasy			
2005	Yoshitsune	Taira no Tomoyasu	Taiga drama	
2008	Atsuhime	Abe Masahiro	Taiga drama	
2009	Atashinchi no Danshi			
2010	Clouds Over the Hill	Katō Tomosaburō		
2011	Gō	Honda Masanobu	Taiga drama	
2012	Priceless	Hirose		
2014	Emergency Interrogation Room	Masanao Gōhara		
2016	Sanada Maru	Sanada Masayuki	Taiga drama	
2017	Bakumatsu Gourmet Bushi Meshi!	The Lord		
2017	Doctor-X Season 5	Kagenobu Uchikanda		
2018	Fūunji tachi	Tanuma Okitsugu	Television film	
2019	Innocence, Fight Against False Charges	Shin Kurokawa	Special appearance	
2019	Natsuzora: Natsu's Sky	Taiju Shibata	Asadora	
2020	Operation Z	Prime minister Ejima	Lead role	
2020	Love Begins When the Money Ends	Tomihiko Saruwatari	Miniseries	
2021	A Man and His Cat	Kanda Fuyuki	Lead role	
2022	Chimudondon	Gorō Ōsato	Asadora	
2022–24	The Honest Realtor	Toshiro Tosaka	2 seasons	

=== Dubbing ===
Year	Title	Role	Notes	Ref.
1997	My Best Friend's Wedding	George Downes (Rupert Everett)	2000 NTV edition	
2008	WALL-E	Captain B. McCrea		
2017	Murder on the Orient Express	Hercule Poirot (Kenneth Branagh)		

== Awards and prizes ==
Year	Award	Category	Work	Result	Ref.
1975	Elan d'or Awards	Newcomer of the Year	Himself	Won	
2017	10th Tokyo Drama Awards	Best Supporting Actor	Sanada Maru	Won	
