= Takeshi Yagi =

Japanese TV director/producer

- Born: Takeshi Yagi (八木 毅, Yagi Takeshi); Tokyo, Japan

Takeshi Yagi (八木 毅, Yagi Takeshi) is a Japanese TV director/producer whose credits include Tsuburaya Productions' popular Ultra Series.

== Personal history ==
Born in 1967, Yagi grew up during the boom of tokusatsu television shows in Japan. In the mid-1990s, he joined Tsuburaya Productions, the creators of the popular Ultra Series, working as an Assistant Director on TV series such as Ultraman Tiga. He made his directorial debut on the fourth episode of the TV mini-series Moon Spiral in 1996. He continued to serve as both a Director and Director of Special Effects for the majority of Tsuburaya Productions' Ultra Series until 2007.

In 2004, Yagi was credited as the Main Director for Ultra Q: Dark Fantasy. The following year, he was promoted to Series Producer for 2005's Ultraman Max, where he made the popular decision to bring in acclaimed directors Shusuke Kaneko and Takashi Miike to direct episodes for the series. In 2007, he acted as the Series Organizer and Main Director for the late-night Ultraseven X. Around the same time, he also began work on his first feature film, Superior Ultraman 8 Brothers.

Yagi retired from Tsuburaya Productions in January 2008 to pursue a career as a freelance director/producer. His first directorial piece after leaving Tsuburaya Productions was Toei's Urban Legend Sepia.

== Filmography ==
Year	Title	Format	Occupation
1996	Moon Spiral	TV	Director
1999	Ultraman Gaia	TV	Director
2001	Ultraman Cosmos	TV	Director
2001	Ultraman Gaia: Gaia Again	Video	Director
2004	Ultra Q: Dark Fantasy	TV	Director
2004	Ultraman Nexus	TV	Director
2005	Ultraman Max	TV	Series Producer
2006	Ultraman Mebius	TV	Director
2007	Ultraseven X	TV	Series Organiser
2008	Superior Ultraman 8 Brothers	Movie	Director
2009	Urban Legend Sepia	TV	Director
