= Shopping Hero =

2002 Japanese television drama

Shopping Hero, also known as Tsuhan-Man (ツーハンマン), is a Japanese comedic television drama. Eleven episodes were created and broadcast on TV Asahi, from July 5, 2002, to September 20, 2002.

== Plot ==
The show centers around Makoto, a mild-mannered businessman who works for Paradise Corporation. Makoto is unable to confess his true feelings to his coworker, Yuka. She works as the queen of shopping on Paradise Corporation's show and is late for broadcasting. To save the show, Makoto appears as Shopping Hero and thus a legend is born. His performance is a great success, he's forced to do this weekly and his identity remains hidden amongst his peers. During his product presentation, he is able to pitch his product and teach a life lesson to his audience.

== Cast ==
- Shunsuke Nakamura
- Ayako Kawahara
- Kenji Kohashi
- Hiromasa Taguchi
- Masao Kusakari
- Sawa Suzuki
- Hiroshi Tamaki
