= A Man and His Cat =

Japanese manga series by Umi Sakurai

- Cover of the first print edition of the series, featuring Kanda and Fukumaru

おじさまと猫 (Ojisama to Neko)
- Genre: Comedy, slice of life
- Created by: Umi Sakurai
- Manga
- Written by: Umi Sakurai
- Published by: Pixiv, Square Enix
- English publisher: NA: Square Enix Manga
- Imprint: Gangan Comics
- Magazine: Monthly Shōnen Gangan; Gangan Pixiv
- Original run: 2017 – present
- Volumes: 17
- Television drama
- Directed by: Keijiro Tsubakimoto; Masahiro Soejima
- Written by: Mitsuhiko Fujimi; Date-san
- Studio: Socket
- Original network: TV Tokyo, TVO
- Original run: January 6, 2021 – March 24, 2021
- Episodes: 12
- icon

A Man and His Cat (Japanese: おじさまと猫, Hepburn: Ojisama to Neko) is a Japanese manga series written and illustrated by Umi Sakurai. Self-published as a webcomic by Sakurai before being serialized by Square Enix Manga, the series follows an older widower who adopts an unwanted cat.

A live-action television drama adaptation aired from January to March 2021. The cats are portrayed by puppets.

== Synopsis ==
Fukumaru, a large and homely Exotic Shorthair at a pet store, is regularly passed over in favor of kittens that are younger and cuter than he is. He is unexpectedly purchased by Kanda, an older man who is recently widowed and who has a distant relationship with his adult children. The episodic, slice of life series follows Kanda and Fukumaru as they live and seek mutual companionship together.

== Characters ==
Fuyuki Kanda (神田冬樹, Kanda Fuyuki)
Portrayed by: Masao Kusakari
A world-famous and highly renowned classical pianist who works as a music teacher at a local school. Kanda is a middle-aged widower and the owner of Fukumaru; he was inspired to adopt him after falling into loneliness due to the death of his cat-loving wife. He has post-traumatic stress disorder surrounding concert halls or musical performances of any sort, and has not performed professionally since the death of his wife.
Fukumaru (ふくまる)
Voiced by: Ryunosuke Kamiki (TV drama)
A chubby black-and-white male Exotic Shorthair cat who is the runt of his five siblings. Fukumaru was put up for sale at a local pet shop when he was a kitten, but struggled to sell due to customers finding his flat face ugly. When he is around a year old, he is adopted by Kanda. Fukumaru is shown to be a spoilt but kind indoor cat who loves food and being petted.
Natsuhito Kobayashi (小林夏彦, Kobayashi Natsuhito)
Kanda's best friend since childhood. He is a loud and boisterous man with a pet Shiba Inu named Chako, and initially dislikes cats. He is disliked by Fukumaru for his personality.

== Media ==
=== Manga ===
A Man and His Cat was originally self-published by Sakurai, with new entries in the series posted weekly on her Twitter and Pixiv accounts. The series is also published by Square Enix in its manga magazines Monthly Shōnen Gangan and Gangan Pixiv, and has been collected in seventeen tankōbon volumes. To date, the series has received over 560 million views.

In May 2019, Penguin Random House announced that it would partner with Square Enix to launch Square Enix Manga as an imprint in North America, with A Man and His Cat as one of the imprint's anchor titles. The first volume of the series was released in English in February 2020.

No.	Original release date	Original ISBN	English release date	English ISBN
1	February 22, 2018	978-4-7575-5626-3	February 11, 2020	978-1-64609-026-6
2	November 22, 2018	978-4-7575-5772-7 (SE); 978-4-7575-5773-4 (LE)	July 14, 2020	978-1-64609-027-3
3	July 12, 2019	978-4-7575-5626-3	February 23, 2021	978-1-64609-028-0
4	January 11, 2020	978-4-7575-6464-0	September 14, 2021	978-1-64609-093-8
5	June 12, 2020	978-4-7575-6669-9	January 25, 2022	978-1-64609-115-7
6	December 11, 2020	978-4-7575-6920-1	June 14, 2022	978-1-64609-138-6
7	March 22, 2021	978-4-7575-7154-9	October 25, 2022	978-1-64609-139-3
8	September 22, 2021	978-4-7575-7465-6	July 4, 2023	978-1-64609-163-8
9	May 12, 2022	978-4-7575-7939-2	September 5, 2023	978-1-64609-214-7
10	November 11, 2022	978-4-7575-8262-0	March 26, 2024	978-1-64609-246-8
11	May 11, 2023	978-4-7575-8571-3	June 4, 2024	978-1-64609-268-0
12	November 10, 2023	978-4-7575-8899-8	October 15, 2024	978-1-64609-313-7
13	June 12, 2024	978-4-7575-9246-9	April 8, 2025	978-1-64609-388-5
14	December 12, 2024	978-4-7575-9567-5	December 2, 2025	978-1-64609-446-2
15	June 12, 2025	978-4-7575-9893-5	April 14, 2026	978-1-64609-490-5
16	January 9, 2026	978-4-301-00277-2	—	—
17	June 11, 2026	978-4-301-00580-3	—	—

=== Drama ===
A live-action television drama adaptation was announced in November 2020. It aired 12 episodes on TV Tokyo from January 6 to March 24, 2021.

=== Video game ===
In the eighth volume of the manga, it was revealed that a video game adaptation was in development. The game, titled Ojisama to Neko Super Miracle Puzzle, was a puzzle game and featured voice acting from Jouji Nakata and Natsuki Hanae as Fuyuki Kanda and Fukumaru respectively. It was released on Android and iOS devices from January 20, 2022, to January 31, 2023.

=== Other media ===
Short motion comic videos have been produced to promote the release of the tankōbon editions of the series, and feature Jouji Nakata as the voice of Kanda.

A picture book adaptation was released on November 11, 2022. At Anime Expo 2023, Square Enix Manga & Books announced that they licensed the picture book for English publication.

== Reception ==
A Man and His Cat has received positive reviews from critics. Anime UK News gave the series 8 out of 10, praising the narrative for being heartwarming without being overly sentimental. Manga Bookshelf noted that the book "hits you in the feels" and praised the quality of its storytelling.

A Man and His Cat was one of the top-selling physical manga series on Amazon Japan in 2018. The first Japanese tankōbon edition of the series debuted at third in the Oricon sales rankings.

In 2018, A Man and His Cat was one of the top recommended manga titles in a survey of Japanese bookstore employees. That same year, the series was a runner-up in for the Grand Prize at the magazine's Next Manga Awards organized by the manga magazine Da Vinci. Da Vinci also ranked A Man and His Cat in its annual Book of the Year rankings in 2018 and 2019. The series also placed fourth in the 2018 Pixiv's Comic Ranking, and third in Pixiv's 2018 Web Manga General Election. The 2019 edition of Kono Manga ga Sugoi! ranked A Man and His Cat as the fifth best manga series for female readers.
