= Katsura Motozumi =

Japanese samurai

- 桂 元澄
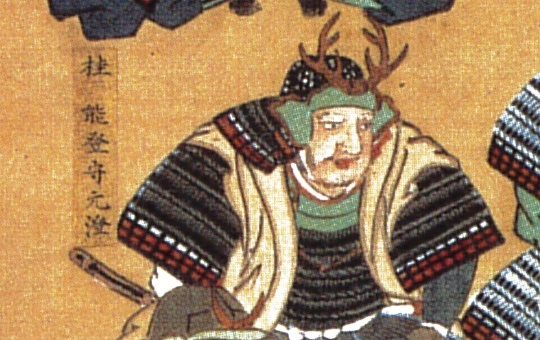
- Born: 1500; Aki Province
- Died: 5 September 1569 (aged 68–69)
- Military career
- Commands: Katsura Castle, Sakurao Castle
- Conflicts: Battle of Miyajima

Katsura Motozumi (桂 元澄; 1500 – 5 September 1569) was a Japanese samurai and commander of the Sengoku period. Motozumi was one of the most important retainers of the Mōri clan. He was also the castle lord in command of Sakurao Castle.

Saka Hirohide, who was related to Motosumi's father Katsura Hirozumi, rebelled against Mōri Motonari. Hirohide was dissatisfied with Motonari's succession to the family headship, but the rebellion ended in failure . Later, Hirozumi took responsibility for the conflict and committed seppuku. In the Battle of Miyajima, Motozumi succeeded as a decoy and lured Sue Harukata's army toward Itsukushima and so contributed to the victory of the Mōri clan.

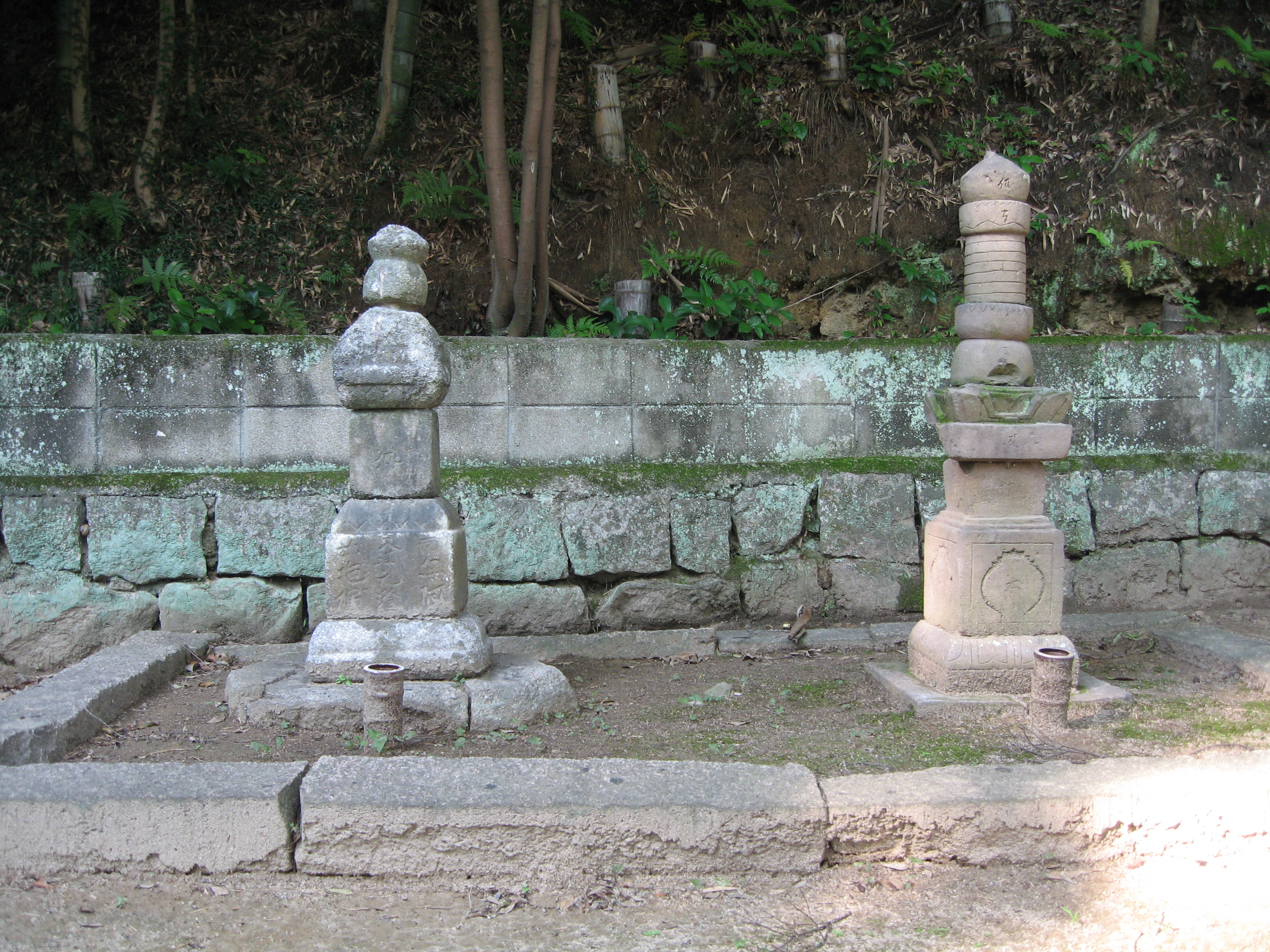
Katsura Motozumi and his wife's grave
