= Kaori Sakagami =

Japanese singer and actress

Kaori Sakagami 坂上 香織
- Born: 29 July 1974 (age 52); Nagasaki, Japan
- Genres: Japanese Pop
- Occupation: Singer
- Instrument: Vocals
- Years active: 1987–2008

Japanese name
- Kanji: 坂上 香織
- Hiragana: さかがみ かおり
- Katakana: サカガミ カオリ
Transcriptions
- Romanization: Sakagami Kaori

Kaori Sakagami (坂上 香織, Sakagami Kaori; born 29 July 1974) is a former Japanese singer and actress who is noted for singing Platonic Tsuranuite, the first ending of Ranma ½. Also in Kiteretsu Daihyakka, she sang "Race no Cardigan" for the ending theme in the first season. In 1991, she portrayed Ai Amano in the live-action version of the popular manga series Video Girl Ai. She also portrays Deputy Captain Shinobu Mizuki in Ultraman Cosmos. She retired from the music industry at 15 years old. In 1993, she was in Japanese Playboy at the age of 19.

== Works ==
- Platonic Tsuranuite (Let's Keep It Platonic)
- Race no Cardigan (Lace Cardigan)
- Good-bye My Love
- Boyfriend
- Privacy
- Summer Kiss

== Filmography ==
Year	Title	Role	Notes
1990	Osu!! Karate-bu		
1991	Video Girl Ai	Ai Amano	
1995	Rei Tin: Ko redisu!!! Socho saigo no hi	Kaori Ukon	
1995	Hana Yori Dango	Sakurako Sanjo	
1996	Yabu no naka	Masago	
1998	Manji	Sonoko	
2000	Shin otokogi: Kanketsu-hen		
2000	Boogiepop wa Warawanai	Karaoke staff	
2001-2002	Ultraman Cosmos	Deputy-Captain Shinobu Mizuki	65 episodes
2002	Ultraman Cosmos 2: The Blue Planet	Deputy-Captain Shinobu Mizuki	
2003	Ultraman Cosmos vs. Ultraman Justice: The Final Battle	Deputy-Captain Shinobu Mizuki	
2006	Beni bara fujin		
2007	Kuchisake-onna	Saori Tamura	
2007	Kyonyu wo business ni shita otoko		(final film role)
