= Katsura Hirozumi =

Japanese samurai

- 桂 広澄
- Born: Unknown; Aki Province
- Died: 1524; Katsura castle
- Military career
- Commands: Katsura Castle

Katsura Hirozumi (桂 広澄; ? – 1524) was a Japanese samurai and commander of the Sengoku period.

Hirozumi's relative Saka Hirohide rebelled against Mōri Motonari, as Hirohide was dissatisfied with Motonari's succession to the family headship. However, the rebellion ended in failure . He took responsibility for the conflict and committed seppuku, even though Motonari never pursued for his responsibility for the matter. His son Katsura Motozumi became one of the most important retainers of the Mōri clan. Motozumi served Motonari and Mōri Terumoto until his death.

== In popular culture ==
Hirozumi was portrayed by actor Masao Kusakari in the 1997 Japanese television series Mōri Motonari.
