= Ultraman Cosmos =

Japanese television series

- Genre: Tokusatsu; Kaiju; Superhero; Adventure; Science fiction Kyodai Hero
- Created by: Tsuburaya Productions
- Developed by: Naoyuki Edo
- Directed by: Tsugumi Kitaura
- Starring: Taiyo Sugiura; Daisuke Shima; Kaori Sakagami; Hidekazu Ichinose; Koichi Sudo; Mayuka Suzuki
- Opening theme: Spirit by Project DMM
- Ending theme: Ultraman Cosmos~Kimi ni Dekiru Nani Ka by Project DMM; Kokoro no Kizuna by Project DMM
- Composer: Tōru Fuyuki
- Country of origin: Japan
- No. of episodes: 65

Production
- Running time: 24 minutes
- Production companies: Tsuburaya Productions; Mainichi Broadcasting System

Original release
- Network: JNN (MBS, TBS)
- Release: July 7, 2001 – September 28, 2002

Related
- Ultraman Neos; Ultra Q: Dark Fantasy

Ultraman Cosmos (ウルトラマンコスモス, Urutoraman Kosumosu) is a Japanese tokusatsu TV series being the twelfth entry (seventeenth overall) show in the Ultra Series. Produced by Tsuburaya Productions, Ultraman Cosmos aired from July 7, 2001 to September 28, 2002, with a total of 65 episodes, which currently makes it the longest running Ultra show to date. It was also released to celebrate the 35th anniversary of the Ultraman series.

In June 2002, Cosmos was taken off of television for several weeks (following the broadcast of the 49th episode) when lead actor Taiyo Sugiura was questioned in an assault and extortion case. When the case against Sugiura was dropped for lack of evidence, Cosmos was put back on the air. MBS, TBS and Tsuburaya ultimately pulled five episodes (50, 52, 54, 56, and 58) from broadcast to make up for time lost, and these episodes were later released on DVD.

In April 2017, the television channel TOKU announced that they would release the series in the United States in the near future. A year later, the series was released by the channel on April 23, 2018.

== Story concepts ==
Observing the increasing trend of violence that occurred in the younger generation of Japan, Tsuburaya made an Ultraman character that has a gentler nature than its predecessors. With a dominantly blue look, Tsuburaya wanted to elevate Ultraman's image as a figure of love for the environment and peace. Thus, the concept of the story is the theme of pacifism, meaning an idea which considers war to be morally unjustifiable, and all disputes or disagreements must be resolved by the way of peace. So Ultraman Cosmos is a gentle Ultraman, engaging in nonviolent fights.

== Plot ==
The series featured many firsts for the franchise, including the start of the story in a movie rather than the series proper. Ultraman Cosmos: The First Contact was the prequel to the series and took place eight years before episode 1. In it, 11-year-old Musashi Haruno encounters the being of light, Ultraman Cosmos (ウルトラマンコスモス, Urutoraman Kosumosu), and befriends him as the two confront a threat to Earth.

Ten years later, Musashi, now 19 and a member of Team EYES, once again encounters the being of light from his childhood. The dark being Chaos Header has appeared and is corrupting the monsters of Earth, making them become ravenous and violent creatures that threaten humanity. Through Musashi's will to see the beasts and humans live in peace, Cosmos grants him a new power that will allow him to heal the corrupted creatures.

== Episodes ==
No.	Title	Directed by	Written by	Original release date
1	"Reunion With Light"; Transliteration: "Hikari to no Saikai" (Japanese: 光との再会)	Tsugumi Kitaura	Shinsuke Onishi	July 7, 2001
2	"The Shadow of the Chaos Header"; Transliteration: "Kaosu Heddā no Kage" (Japanese: カオスヘッダーの影)	Tsugumi Kitaura	Shinsuke Onishi	July 14, 2001
3	"Fly, Musashi!"; Transliteration: "Tobe! Musashi" (Japanese: 飛べ! ムサシ)	Miki Nemoto	Keiichi Hasegawa	July 21, 2001
4	"The Fallen Robot"; Transliteration: "Ochitekita Robotto" (Japanese: 落ちてきたロボット)	Masaki Harada	Hideyuki Kawakami	July 28, 2001
5	"Revenge of the Fireflies"; Transliteration: "Hotaru no Fukushū" (Japanese: 蛍の復讐)	Ryuichi Ichino	Hideyuki Kawakami	August 4, 2001
6	"Monster Fishing"; Transliteration: "Kaijū Ipponzuri" (Japanese: 怪獣一本釣り)	Ryuichi Ichino	Takahiko Masuda	August 11, 2001
7	"Present from the Sky"; Transliteration: "Sora kara no Purezento" (Japanese: 空からのプレゼント)	Kazuya Konaka	Junki Takegami	August 18, 2001
8	"Sleeping Maiden"; Transliteration: "Otome no Nemuri" (Japanese: 乙女の眠り)	Kazuya Konaka	Hideyuki Kawakami	August 25, 2001
9	"Friend in the Forest"; Transliteration: "Mori no Tomodachi" (Japanese: 森の友だち)	Masaki Harada	Junki Takegami	September 1, 2001
10	"The Bronze Devil"; Transliteration: "Seidō no Majin" (Japanese: 青銅の魔神)	Miki Nemoto	Shinsuke Onishi	September 8, 2001
11	"Move! Monster"; Transliteration: "Ugoke! Kaijū" (Japanese: 動け! 怪獣)	Tsugumi Kitaura	Satoru Nishizono	September 15, 2001
12	"The Organism of Light"; Transliteration: "Inochi no Kagayaki" (Japanese: 生命の輝き)	Tsugumi Kitaura	Junki Takegami	September 22, 2001
13	"Daughter of Time: Part 1"; Transliteration: "Toki no Musume (Zenpen)" (Japanese: 時の娘 前編)	Masaki Harada	Ai Ōta	September 29, 2001
14	"Daughter of Time: Part 2"; Transliteration: "Toki no Musume (Kōhen)" (Japanese: 時の娘 後編)	Masaki Harada	Ai Ōta	October 6, 2001
15	"Deep Sea Fight"; Transliteration: "Shinkai no Shitō" (Japanese: 深海の死闘)	Ryuichi Ichino	Shinsuke Onishi	October 13, 2001
16	"The Flying Whale"; Transliteration: "Tobu Kujira" (Japanese: 飛ぶクジラ)	Ryuichi Ichino	Keiichi Hasegawa	October 20, 2001
17	"The Different Dimensional Trap"; Transliteration: "Ijigen no Wana" (Japanese: 異次元の罠)	Hirochika Muraishi	Junki Takegami	October 27, 2001
18	"The Legend of Mt. Nibito"; Transliteration: "Nibitoyama Densetsu" (Japanese: 二人山伝説)	Hirochika Muraishi	Hideyuki Kawakami	November 3, 2001
19	"Star Lover"; Transliteration: "Hoshi no Koibito" (Japanese: 星の恋人)	Takeshi Yagi	Kengo Kaji	November 10, 2001
20	"Musashi’s Sky"; Transliteration: "Musashi no Sora" (Japanese: ムサシの空)	Takeshi Yagi	Sotaro Hayashi	November 17, 2001
21	"The Battle With the Tech Booster: Part 1"; Transliteration: "Tekku Būsutā Shutsudō seyo (Zenpen)" (Japanese: テックブースター出動せよ 前編)	Miki Nemoto	Kengo Kaji & Sotaro Hayashi	November 24, 2001
22	"The Battle With the Tech Booster: Part 2"; Transliteration: "Tekku Būsutā Shutsudō seyo (Kōhen)" (Japanese: テックブースター出動せよ 後編)	Miki Nemoto	Kengo Kaji & Sotaro Hayashi	December 1, 2001
23	"Luna vs. Luna"; Transliteration: "Runa Tai Runa" (Japanese: ルナ対ルナ)	Tsugumi Kitaura	Kenichi Araki	December 8, 2001
24	"Warm Memories"; Transliteration: "Nukumori no Kioku" (Japanese: ぬくもりの記憶)	Masaki Harada	Masakazu Migita	December 15, 2001
25	"Alien Girl"; Transliteration: "Isei no Hito" (Japanese: 異星の少女)	Masaki Harada	Takahiko Masuda	December 22, 2001
26	"The Power to Defeat the Chaos"; Transliteration: "Kaosu o Taosu Chikara" (Japanese: カオスを倒す力)	Tsugumi Kitaura	Shinsuke Onishi	December 29, 2001
27	"A Space Monster Is Born on Earth"; Transliteration: "Chikyū Umare no Uchū Kaijū" (Japanese: 地球生まれの宇宙怪獣)	Ryuichi Ichino	Atsushi Maekawa	January 5, 2002
28	"Strength and Power"; Transliteration: "Tsuyosa to Chikara" (Japanese: 強さと力)	Ryuichi Ichino	Shinsuke Onishi	January 12, 2002
29	"Dreaming Courage"; Transliteration: "Yumemiru Yūki" (Japanese: 夢みる勇気)	Miki Nemoto	Shinsuke Onishi	January 19, 2002
30	"Eclipse"; Transliteration: "Ekuripusu" (Japanese: エクリプス)	Miki Nemoto	Shinsuke Onishi	January 26, 2002
31	"Rescue Gon"; Transliteration: "Gon o Sukue" (Japanese: ゴンを救え)	Hirochika Muraishi	Junki Takegami	February 2, 2002
32	"The Nightmare Experiment"; Transliteration: "Akumu no Jikken" (Japanese: 悪夢の実験)	Hirochika Muraishi	Yū Yamamoto	February 9, 2002
33	"Monster Hunter"; Transliteration: "Kaijū Hantā" (Japanese: 怪獣狙撃手)	Takeshi Yagi	Kengo Kaji & Sotaro Hayashi	February 16, 2002
34	"Wrath of the Sea God"; Transliteration: "Kaijin no Ikari" (Japanese: 海神の怒り)	Takeshi Yagi	Sotaro Hayashi	February 23, 2002
35	"The Magic Stone"; Transliteration: "Mahō no Ishii" (Japanese: 魔法の石)	Masaki Harada	Hideyuki Kawakami	March 2, 2002
36	"The Mountain of Yōkai"; Transliteration: "Yōkai no Yama" (Japanese: 妖怪の山)	Masaki Harada	Junki Takegami	March 9, 2002
37	"Fubuki Retires?!"; Transliteration: "Fubuki Tainin?!" (Japanese: フブキ退任?!)	Ryuichi Ichino	Atsushi Maekawa	March 16, 2002
38	"Alien Old Man"; Transliteration: "Oyaji Seijin" (Japanese: オヤジ星人)	Ryuichi Ichino	Takahiko Masuda	March 23, 2002
39	"Light of Evil"; Transliteration: "Jaaku no Hikari" (Japanese: 邪悪の光)	Miki Nemoto	Shinsuke Onishi	March 30, 2002
40	"Giant of Evil"; Transliteration: "Jaaku no Kyojin" (Japanese: 邪悪の巨人)	Miki Nemoto	Hideyuki Kawakami	April 6, 2002
41	"The Green Fugitive"; Transliteration: "Midori no Tōbōsha" (Japanese: 緑の逃亡者)	Teruyoshi Ishii	Kenichi Araki	April 13, 2002
42	"Friend"; Transliteration: "Tomodachi" (Japanese: ともだち)	Teruyoshi Ishii	Shinsuke Onishi	April 20, 2002
43	"Puppet Monster"; Transliteration: "Ayatsuri Kaijū" (Japanese: 操り怪獣)	Hirochika Muraishi	Hideyuki Kawakami	April 27, 2002
44	"Ghighi vs. Gon"; Transliteration: "Gigi Tai Gon" (Japanese: ギギVSゴン)	Hirochika Muraishi	Junki Takegami	May 4, 2002
45	"The Amusement Park Legend"; Transliteration: "Yūenchi Densetsu" (Japanese: 遊園地伝説)	Takeshi Yagi	Masakazu Migita	May 11, 2002
46	"The Miraculous Flower"; Transliteration: "Kiseki no Hana" (Japanese: 奇跡の花)	Takeshi Yagi	Sotaro Hayashi	May 18, 2002
47	"Sorceress of the Sky"; Transliteration: "Sora no Majo" (Japanese: 空の魔女)	Masaki Harada	Satoshi Suzuki	May 25, 2002
48	"Waroga Counterattack"; Transliteration: "Waroga Gyakushū" (Japanese: ワロガ逆襲)	Masaki Harada	Masakazu Migita	June 1, 2002
49	"Snow of Space"; Transliteration: "Uchū no Yuki" (Japanese: 宇宙の雪)	Ryuichi Ichino	Shinsuke Onishi	June 8, 2002
50	"Monster Smuggling!?"; Transliteration: "Kaijū Mitsuyu!?" (Japanese: 怪獣密輸!?)	Ryuichi Ichino	Hideyuki Kawakami	June 15, 2002
51	"Enemy of Chaos"; Transliteration: "Kaosu no Teki" (Japanese: カオスの敵)	Miki Nemoto	Kengo Kaji	July 20, 2002
52	"Transformation Impossible!?"; Transliteration: "Henshin Funō!?" (Japanese: 変身不能!?)	Miki Nemoto	Sotaro Hayashi	July 20, 2002
53	"Future Monster"; Transliteration: "Mirai Kaijū" (Japanese: 未来怪獣)	Teruyoshi Ishii	Kenichi Araki	July 27, 2002
54	"Human Transporter"; Transliteration: "Ningen Tensōki" (Japanese: 人間転送機)	Teruyoshi Ishii	Shinsuke Onishi	August 3, 2002
55	"Final Test"; Transliteration: "Saishū Tesuto" (Japanese: 最終テスト)	Hirochika Muraishi	Junki Takegami	August 3, 2002
56	"Kappa Village"; Transliteration: "Kappa no Sato" (Japanese: かっぱの里)	Hirochika Muraishi	Hideyuki Kawakami	August 3, 2002
57	"Door of Snow"; Transliteration: "Yuki no Tobira" (Japanese: 雪の扉)	Masaki Harada	Ai Ōta	August 10, 2002
58	"The Sky of Revenge"; Transliteration: "Fukushū no Sora" (Japanese: 復讐の空)	Masaki Harada	Masakazu Migita	August 10, 2002
59	"Maximum Invasions"; Transliteration: "Saidai no Shinryaku" (Japanese: 最大の侵略)	Takeshi Yagi	Kengo Kaji	August 17, 2002
60	"Chaos War"; Transliteration: "Kaosu Taisen" (Japanese: カオス大戦)	Takeshi Yagi	Kengo Kaji	August 24, 2002
61	"Forbidden Weapon"; Transliteration: "Kindan no Heiki" (Japanese: 禁断の兵器)	Ryuichi Ichino	Takahiko Masuda	August 31, 2002
62	"Cry of the Earth"; Transliteration: "Chikyū no Himei" (Japanese: 地球の悲鳴)	Ryuichi Ichino	Takahiko Masuda	September 7, 2002
63	"Chaos’s Violent Attack"; Transliteration: "Kaosu Gekishū" (Japanese: カオス激襲)	Miki Nemoto	Shinsuke Onishi	September 14, 2002
64	"Deathmatch on the Moon"; Transliteration: "Getsumen no Kessen" (Japanese: 月面の決戦)	Miki Nemoto	Shinsuke Onishi	September 21, 2002
65	"True Hero"; Transliteration: "Shin no Yūsha" (Japanese: 真の勇者)	Miki Nemoto	Shinsuke Onishi	September 28, 2002

== Cast ==
- Musashi Haruno (春野 ムサシ, Haruno Musashi): Taiyo Sugiura (杉浦 太陽, Sugiura Taiyō), Kounosuke Tokai (東海 孝之助, Tōkai Kōnosuke; Childhood)
- Harumitsu Hiura (ヒウラ ハルミツ, Hiura Harumitsu): Daisuke Shima (嶋 大輔, Shima Daisuke)
- Shinobu Mizuki (ミズキ シノブ, Mizuki Shinobu): Kaori Sakagami (坂上 香織, Sakagami Kaori)
- Keisuke Fubuki (フブキ ケイスケ, Fubuki Keisuke): Hidekazu Ichinose (市瀬 秀和, Ichinose Hidekazu)
- Koji Doigaki (ドイガキ コウジ, Doigaki Kōji): Koichi Sudo (須藤 公一, Sudō Kōichi)
- Ayano Morimoto (モリモト アヤノ, Morimoto Ayano): Mayuka Suzuki (鈴木 繭菓, Suzuki Mayuka)
- Commander Sahara (佐原司令官, Sahara-shirei-kan): Masahiro Sudō (須藤 正裕, Sudō Masahiro)
- Vice Commander Shishikura (宍倉副司令官, Shishikura-fuku-shirei-kan): Eiji Ōki (大城 英司, Ōki Eiji)
- Naval Officer Saijō (西条武官, Saijō-bukan): Atsushi Narasaka (奈良 坂篤, Narasaka Atsushi)
- Director Ikeyama (イケヤマ管理官, Ikeyama-kanri-kan): Hyōe Ichikawa (市川 兵衛, Ichikawa Hyōe)
- Azusa Niimi (新見 あづさ, Niimi Azusa): Kayano Komaki (小牧 かやの, Kayano Komaki)
- Mitsuya (ミツヤ): Issey Takahashi (高橋 一生, Takahashi Issei)
- Noboru Kawaya (カワヤ ノボル, Kawaya Noboru): Shigeki Kagemaru (影丸 茂樹, Kagemaru Shigeki)
- Yukari Yoshii (吉井 ユカリ, Yoshii Yukari): Nana Horie (堀江 奈々, Horie Nana)
- Science Director Hazumi (ハズミ科学主任, Hazumi-kagaku-shunin): Takumi Tsutsui (筒井 巧, Tsutsui Takumi)
- Bengals Captain Oka (ベンガルズ隊長・岡, Bengaruzu taichō Oka), Evacuees (1): Hideki Oka (岡 秀樹, Oka Hideki)

=== Voice cast ===
- Ultraman Cosmos: Hiroyuki Sato (佐藤 浩之, Satō Hiroyuki)
- Chaos Header (カオスヘッダー, Kaosu Heddā)/Chaos Ultraman (カオスウルトラマン, Chaos Ultraman): Koji Haramaki (服巻 浩司, Haramaki Koji)
- Narrator, TV announcer (6): Hiroshi Isobe (磯部 弘, Isobe Hiroshi)

=== Guest cast ===
- Igomas (イゴマス, Igomasu; Voice; 4), Ishii (石井; 14, 25, 48, 58): Hiroshi Ishii (石井 浩, Ishii Hiroshi)
- Sosuke Nagano's father (7): Yoichi Okamura (岡村 洋一, Okamura Yoichi)
- Yasuhiro Iwata (岩田 康祐, Iwata Yasuhiro; 9): Tamotsu Ishibashi (石橋 保, Ishibashi Tamotsu)
- Shinichi Takekoshi (竹越 真一, Takekoshi Shin'ichi; 18): Arthur Kuroda (黒田 アーサー, Kuroda Āsā)
- Kensaku Kimoto (木本 研作, Kimoto Kensaku; 20): Shunji Fujimura (藤村 俊二, Fujimura Shunji)
- Jun Takasugi (高杉 純, Takasugi Jun; 24): Makoto Kamijo (上條 誠, Kamijō Makoto)
- Alien Sreiyu "Lamia" (スレイユ星人 ラミア, Sureiyu Seijin Ramia; 25): Becky (ベッキー, Bekkī)
- Clevergon (クレバーゴン, Kurebāgon; Voice; 29, 31, 44): Hiroko Sakurai (桜井 浩子, Sakurai Hiroko)
- Tadao Kusano (草野 忠雄, Kusano Tadao; 38): Shoichiro Akaboshi (赤星 昇一郎, Akaboshi Shōichirō)
- Yamano/Alien Curia (山野/キュリア星人, Yamano/Kyuria Seijin; 46): Eisuke Tsunoda (角田 英介, Tsunoda Eisuke)
- Keizō (敬造; 56): Ken Okabe (岡部 健, Okabe Ken)
- Shōichi (正一; 56): Eiichi Kikuchi (きくち 英一, Kikuchi Eiichi)
- Old Man Tomano (戸間乃老人, Tomano-rōjin; 57): Hideyo Amamoto (天本 英世, Amamoto Hideyo)

== Songs ==
Opening theme

- "Spirit"
  - Lyrics: Goro Matsui
  - Composition: KATSUMI
  - Arrangement: Takao Konishi
  - Artist: Project DMM

Ending themes

- "Ultraman Cosmos ~ Kimi ni Dekiru Nanika" (ウルトラマンコスモス～君にできるなにか, Urutoraman Kosumosu ~ Kimi ni Dekiru Nanika; lit. "You Can Be Something")
  - Lyrics: Goro Matsui
  - Composition: Kisaburo Suzuki
  - Arrangement: Seiichi Kyoda
  - Artist: Project DMM
- "Kokoro no Kizuna" (心の絆; lit. "Bonds of the Heart")
  - Lyrics, Composition: KATSUMI
  - Arrangement: Kazuya Daimon
  - Artist: Project DMM

== Media ==
=== Feature films ===
- Ultraman Cosmos: The First Contact (2001)
- Ultraman Cosmos 2: The Blue Planet (2002)
- Ultraman Cosmos vs. Ultraman Justice: The Final Battle (2003)

=== Other appearances ===
- Mega Monster Battle: Ultra Galaxy (2009), an alternate iteration of Musashi makes a cameo appearance as a ZAP Spacy member.
- Ultraman Saga (2012), Cosmos joins Ultraman Zero, Ultraman Dyna and five Showa-era Ultra Heroes.
- Ultraman Ginga S: Showdown! Ultra 10 Warriors!! (2015), Cosmos joins Ultraman Ginga, and eight Heisei-era Ultra Heroes.
- Ultraman Orb: The Origin Saga (2016-2017), Musashi joins Ultraman Orb and Ultraman Dyna.
- Ultra Galaxy Fight: The Absolute Conspiracy (2020), Cosmos along with Justice joins Ultraman 80, Ultraman Neos and Ultraseven 21 at Planet Feed to fight against Leugocyte.

== Home media ==
In July 2020, Shout! Factory announced to have struck a multi-year deal with Alliance Entertainment and Mill Creek, with the blessings of Tsuburaya and Indigo, that granted them the exclusive SVOD and AVOD digital rights to the Ultra series and films (1,100 TV episodes and 20 films) acquired by Mill Creek the previous year. Ultraman Cosmos, amongst other titles, will stream in the United States and Canada through Shout! Factory TV and Tokushoutsu.

The series is scheduled to be released in the United States on DVD November 1, 2022 by Mill Creek Entertainment.
