= Ultraman Max =

Japanese television series

- Promotional poster
- Genre: Superhero; Tokusatsu; Science fiction; Action/Adventure; Kaiju; Kyodai Hero
- Created by: Kazuo Tsuburaya
- Developed by: Yūji Kobayashi
- Directed by: Shusuke Kaneko
- Starring: Sota Aoyama; Nobuyuki Ogawa; Hitomi Hasebe; Sean Nichols; Hikari Mitsushima; Kai Shishido; Hiroko Sakurai; Susumu Kurobe
- Composers: Kuniaki Haishima, Toru Fuyuki
- Country of origin: Japan
- Original language: Japanese
- No. of episodes: 39 (with 1 special)

Production
- Producer: Takeshi Yagi
- Running time: Approx. 24 mins per episode
- Production companies: Tsuburaya Productions; Chubu-Nippon Broadcasting

Original release
- Network: JNN (CBC, TBS)
- Release: July 2, 2005 – April 1, 2006

Related
- Ultraman Nexus; Ultraman Mebius

Ultraman Max (ウルトラマンマックス, Urutoraman Makkusu) is a Japanese tokusatsu series produced by Tsuburaya Productions and Chubu-Nippon Broadcasting Company. Released as the fourteenth entry (twentieth overall) in the Ultra Series, it aired from July 2, 2005, until April 1, 2006. The show aimed to return to the fast-paced formula of encountering a new monster each week, similar to the previous series, with the exception of Ultraman Nexus. On October 10, 2014, Crunchyroll announced that the series would be broadcast on their streaming service starting on October 17, 2014, in the US, Canada, Latin America, UK, Australia, and New Zealand.

On January 27, 2017, the US television channel TOKU announced that the series would be broadcast in the United States on its channel beginning February 27, 2017, making it the fifth Ultra Series to air in the United States after Ultraman, Ultraseven, Ultraman: Towards the Future (filmed in Australia), Ultraman: The Ultimate Hero (filmed in the U.S.) and Ultraman Tiga.

== Synopsis ==
In the 21st century, multiple phenomenas begin to occur as monsters who were initially thought to be a part of mythology come to life. These phenomenas resulted from human activities that disrupted the nature of the ecosystem.

Kaito Touma dreamed of entering DASH because previously he was a volunteer who often rescued people from natural disasters. However, he failed the entrance test because he was considered too hot-spirited when trying to protect people without thinking and often unconsciously doing excessive actions that endangered his safety. Kaito still insists on getting into DASH. When he was still an apprentice, Kaito recklessly replaced one of the wounded DASH members to help dispel the monster and avoid heavy casualties. At a critical moment, Kaito bonded with Ultraman Max to save his life and fought the incoming monster on his own.

After being accepted into DASH, Kaito and Max had been teaming up to defend Earth from various monsters and alien threats. In the middle of the series, Max is saved from Zetton by Ultraman Xenon, who gives him the Max Galaxy to even the odds: the device has been added to his arsenal since then. In the final episode, the underground civilization Delos began their invasion of the surface after years of suffering from the negative effects of their civilization. Max initially backed away from the fight due to his race's policy of not interfering with civil wars until Kaito's determination changed the minds of Ultraman and Delos, the latter of whom begged their doomsday weapon Giga Berserk to be stopped. Max was initially killed saving Kaito until DASH members revived him with enough sunlight to destroy Giga Berserk.

The Ultraman left Earth years later, and the elderly Kaito and Mizuki watched their grandchildren depart for space as Earth finally entered a peaceful coexistence with other races.

== Episodes ==
No.	Title	Directed by	Written by	Original release date
1	"Birth of Ultraman Max!"; Transliteration: "Urutoraman Makkusu Tanjō!" (Japanese: ウルトラマンマックス誕生!)	Shusuke Kaneko	Kengo Kaji & Yūji Kobayashi	July 2, 2005
2	"The Girl Who Keeps a Monster"; Transliteration: "Kaijū o Kau On'na" (Japanese: 怪獣を飼う女)	Shusuke Kaneko	Kengo Kaji & Yūji Kobayashi	July 9, 2005
3	"Proof of a Brave Man"; Transliteration: "Yūshi no Shōmei" (Japanese: 勇士の証明)	Hirochika Muraishi	Hideyuki Kawakami	July 16, 2005
4	"Infinite Invaders"; Transliteration: "Mugen no Shinryakusha" (Japanese: 無限の侵略者)	Hirochika Muraishi	Kengo Kaji & Sotaro Hayashi	July 23, 2005
5	"A Monster Island Appears!"; Transliteration: "Shutsugen, Kaijūtō!" (Japanese: 出現、怪獣島!)	Hiroaki Tochihara	Kiyoto Takeuchi	July 30, 2005
6	"5 Seconds Before Bombing"; Transliteration: "Bakugeki, Go-byō Mae" (Japanese: 爆撃、５秒前)	Hiroaki Tochihara	Kiyoto Takeuchi	August 6, 2005
7	"Destroyer of Stars"; Transliteration: "Hoshi no Hakaisha" (Japanese: 星の破壊者)	Kengo Kaji	Kengo Kaji & Takahiro Ōkura	August 13, 2005
8	"DASH Annihilated!?"; Transliteration: "Dasshu Kaimetsu!?" (Japanese: DASH壊滅!?)	Kengo Kaji	Sotaro Hayashi	August 20, 2005
9	"Dragon Lover"; Transliteration: "Ryū no Koibito" (Japanese: 龍の恋人)	Futoshi Sato	Yūji Kobayashi	August 27, 2005
10	"Young DASH"; Transliteration: "Shōnen Dasshu" (Japanese: 少年DASH)	Futoshi Sato	Yōsuke Kuroda	September 3, 2005
11	"Prophecy of Baradhi"; Transliteration: "Barāji no Yogen" (Japanese: バラージの予言)	Shusuke Kaneko	Masaya Ozaki	September 10, 2005
12	"Pursuit at Supersonic Speed"; Transliteration: "Chō Onsoku no Tsuigeki" (Japanese: 超音速の追撃)	Shusuke Kaneko	Jirō Kaneko	September 17, 2005
13	"Zetton's Daughter"; Transliteration: "Zetton no Musume" (Japanese: ゼットンの娘)	Takeshi Yagi	Shozo Uehara	September 24, 2005
14	"King Joe in Love"; Transliteration: "Koi Suru Kingu Jō" (Japanese: 恋するキングジョー)	Takeshi Yagi	Shozo Uehara	October 1, 2005
15	"Miracle of the Third Planet"; Transliteration: "Dai San-ban Wakusei no Kiseki" (Japanese: 第三番惑星の奇跡)	Takashi Miike	Masaru Nakamura	October 8, 2005
16	"Who Am I?"; Transliteration: "Watashi wa Daare" (Japanese: わたしはだあれ?)	Takashi Miike	Masaru Nakamura	October 15, 2005
17	"Ice Beauty"; Transliteration: "Kōri no Bijo" (Japanese: 氷の美女)	Hideaki Murakami	Jirō Kaneko	October 22, 2005
18	"Bright World"; Transliteration: "Akarui Sekai" (Japanese: アカルイセカイ)	Hideaki Murakami	Takuro Fukuda	October 29, 2005
19	"Person Coming from the Door"; Transliteration: "Tobira yori Kitaru Mono" (Japanese: 扉より来たる者)	Hirochika Muraishi	Sotaro Hayashi	November 5, 2005
20	"Drifting Monster"; Transliteration: "Kaijū Hyōryū" (Japanese: 怪獣漂流)	Hirochika Muraishi	Ai Ōta	November 12, 2005
21	"Challenge from Underground"; Transliteration: "Chitei kara no Chōsen" (Japanese: 地底からの挑戦)	Hiroaki Tochihara	Noboru Takagi	November 19, 2005
22	"Butterfly Dream"; Transliteration: "Kochō no Yume" (Japanese: 胡蝶の夢)	Akio Jissoji	Yūji Kobayashi	November 26, 2005
23	"Youth Again"; Transliteration: "Yomigaere Seishun" (Japanese: 甦れ青春)	Hiroaki Tochihara	Yūji Kobayashi	December 3, 2005
24	"The Unmarked Town"; Transliteration: "Nerawarenai Machi" (Japanese: 狙われない街)	Akio Jissoji	Yūji Kobayashi	December 10, 2005
25	"A Distant Friend"; Transliteration: "Haruka naru Yūjin" (Japanese: 遥かなる友人)	Takeshi Yagi	Ai Ōta	December 17, 2005
26	"Elly of Christmas"; Transliteration: "Kurisumasu no Erī" (Japanese: クリスマスのエリー)	Takeshi Yagi	Ai Ōta	December 24, 2005
27	"The Stolen Max Spark"; Transliteration: "Ubawareta Makkusu Supāku" (Japanese: 奪われたマックススパーク)	Takeshi Yagi	Chiaki J. Konaka	December 31, 2005
28	"Evil Attacks"; Transliteration: "Jaaku Shūrai" (Japanese: 邪悪襲来)	Hirochika Muraishi	Sotaro Hayashi	January 15, 2006
29	"Why Do Monsters Appear"; Transliteration: "Kaijū wa Naze Arawareru no ka" (Japanese: 怪獣は何故現れるのか)	Hirochika Muraishi	Chiaki J. Konaka	January 14, 2006
30	"Courage Is from the Heart"; Transliteration: "Yūki o Mune ni" (Japanese: 勇気を胸に)	Toshiyuki Takano	Chiaki J. Konaka	January 21, 2006
31	"Burn! Earth!!"; Transliteration: "Moetsukiro! Chikyū!!" (Japanese: 燃えつきろ! 地球!!)	Kengo Kaji	Kazuki Nakashima	January 28, 2006
32	"Elly Destruction Directive"; Transliteration: "Erī Hakai Shirei" (Japanese: エリー破壊指令)	Kengo Kaji	Takahiro Ōkura	February 4, 2006
33	"Welcome! To The Earth: Part 1: The Science of the Planet Baltan"; Transliteration: "Yōkoso! Chikyū e Zenpen Barutan-sei no Kagaku" (Japanese: ようこそ! 地球へ 前篇 バルタン星の科学)	Toshihiro Iijima	Kitao Senzoku	February 11, 2006
34	"Welcome! To The Earth: Part 2: Farewell Alien Baltan"; Transliteration: "Yōkoso! Chikyū e Kōhen Saraba! Barutan Seijin" (Japanese: ようこそ! 地球へ 後篇 さらば!バルタン星人)	Toshihiro Iijima	Kitao Senzoku	February 18, 2006
35	"Adam and Eve of M32 Nebula"; Transliteration: "Emu Sanjū-ni Seiun no Adamu to Ibu" (Japanese: M32星雲のアダムとイブ)	Shusuke Kaneko	Keisuke Fujikawa	February 25, 2006
36	"Alternate Dimension World"; Transliteration: "Ijigen Sekai" (Japanese: イジゲンセカイ)	Shusuke Kaneko	Takuro Fukuda	March 4, 2006
37	"Constellation Thief"; Transliteration: "Seiza Dorobō" (Japanese: 星座泥棒)	Takeshi Yagi	Yūji Kobayashi	March 11, 2006
38	"Prelude to Earth Destruction"; Transliteration: "Chijō Kaimetsu no Jokyoku" (Japanese: 地上壊滅の序曲)	Takeshi Yagi	Chiaki J. Konaka	March 18, 2006
39	"Seize the Future!"; Transliteration: "Tsukamitore! Mirai" (Japanese: つかみとれ! 未来)	Takeshi Yagi	Chiaki J. Konaka	March 25, 2006
EX	"Special Finale -To the Ultra Future-"; Transliteration: "Supesharu Fināre -Urutora no Mirai e-" (Japanese: スペシャルフィナーレ ～ウルトラの未来へ～)	Takeshi Yagi	Yūji Kobayashi	April 1, 2006

== Super Battle Special ==
After the broadcast of Ultraman Max, an eight-minute special was released on DVD. This special was a five-minute clip show giving a review of Ultraman Max's back-story and primary attacks up until Ultraman Xenon gives him the Max Galaxy. After the clip show, the monster Red King attacks Max with Zetton shortly joining in. The special ends with Max defeating both of them.

== Cast ==
- Kaito Touma (トウマ・カイト, Tōma Kaito): Sōta Aoyama (青山 草太, Aoyama Sōta)
- Kenjiro Koba (コバ・ケンジロウ, Koba Kenjirō): Nobuyuki Ogawa (小川 信行, Ogawa Nobuyuki)
- Mizuki Koishikawa (コイシカワ・ミズキ, Koishikawa Mizuki): Hitomi Hasebe (長谷部 瞳, Hasebe Hitomi)
- Sean White (ショーン・ホワイト, Shōn Howaito): Sean Nichols (ショーン・ニコルス, Shōn Nikorusu)
- Elly (エリー, Erī): Hikari Mitsushima (満島 ひかり, Mitsushima Hikari)
- Shigeru Hijikata (ヒジカタ・シゲル, Hijikata Shigeru): Kai Shishido (宍戸 開, Shishido Kai)
- Yukari Yoshinaga (ヨシナガ・ユカリ, Yoshinaga Yukari): Hiroko Sakurai (桜井 浩子, Sakurai Hiroko)
- Kenzo Tomioka (トミオカ・ケンゾウ, Tomioka Kenzō): Susumu Kurobe (黒部 進, Kurobe Susumu)

=== Voice cast ===
- Ultraman Max: Kazuya Nakai (中井 和哉, Nakai Kazuya)
- Narrator: Shirō Sano (佐野 史郎, Sano Shirō)

=== Guest cast ===
- Mitsugu Shindō (進藤 貢, Shindō Mitsugu; 5–6): Yukijirō Hotaru (螢 雪次朗, Hotaru Yukijirō)
- Kesam (ケサム, Kesamu; 7): Kenzaburo Kikuchi (菊地 謙三郎, Kikuchi Kenzaburo)
- Yūichi Sakata (坂田 裕一, Sakata Yūichi; 11): Uketa Take (タケ・ウケタ, Take Uketa)
- Natsumi Oda (小田 夏美, Oda Natsumi; 13–14): Nao Nagasawa (長澤 奈央, Nagasawa Nao)
- Ultraman Xenon (ウルトラマンゼノン, Urutoraman Zenon; Voice; 13, 39): Osamu Ryūtani (龍谷 修武, Ryūtani Osamu)
- Takeru Ozaki (オザキ タケル, Ozaki Takeru; 19): Kohji Moritsugu (森次 晃嗣, Moritsugu Kōji)
- Alien Tarla (ターラ星人, Tāra Seijin; 19): Alexander Otsuka (アレクサンダー大塚, Arukezandā Ōtsuka)
- Hatsuko Yamaguchi (山口 初子, Yamaguchi Hatsuko; 20): Miyoko Yoshimoto (芳本 美代子, Yoshimoto Miyoko)
- Takeo Yamaguchi (山口 武雄, Yamaguchi Takeo; 20): Joe Onodera (小野寺 丈, Onodera Jō)
- Monk (20), Ichiro Nagareboshi (流れ星 一郎, Nagareboshi Ichirō; 20), Outlaw rider (20), Kousei Ueda (上田 耕生, Ueda Kōsei; 29): Shoichiro Akaboshi (赤星 昇一郎, Akaboshi Shōichirō)
- Ikuo Hasunuma (蓮沼 征夫, Hasunuma Ikuo; 22): Renji Ishibashi (石橋 蓮司, Ishibashi Renji)
- Director Akihiro Saeki (佐伯 昭宏監督, Saeki Akihiro-kantoku; 22): Taro Suwa (諏訪 太朗, Suwa Tarō)
- Dr. Date (ダテ博士, Date-hakase; 23, 31, 34, 38): Masanari Nihei (二瓶 正也, Nihei Masanari)
- Detective Narasaki (楢崎刑事, Narasaki-keiji; 24): Naomasa Musaka (六平 直政, Musaka Naomasa)
- Researcher (24): (Note: Yōjirō Matsunaga (松永 要二郎, Matsunaga Yōjirō) on his nameplate.) Masami Horiuchi (堀内 正美, Horiuchi Masami)
- Man in black (24): Minori Terada (寺田 農, Terada Minori)
- Alien Neril "Keef" (ネリル星人キーフ, Neriru Seijin Kīfu; 25): Gamon Kaai (河相 我聞, Kaai Gamon)
- Ririka (リリカ; 28): Mai Saitō (斉藤 麻衣, Saitō Mai)
- Kenji Sahashi (佐橋 健児, Sahashi Kenji; 29): Kenji Sahara (佐原 健二, Sahara Kenji)
- Yasuhiko Saigo (西郷 保彦, Saigō Yasuhiko; 29): Yasuhiko Saijo (西條 康彦, Saijō Yasuhiko)
- Doctor (30): Kunio Masaoka (正岡 邦夫, Masaoka Kunio)
- Kerus (ケルス, Kerusu; 32): Ryohei (涼平, Ryōhei)
- Police officer (33–34): Ryu Manatsu (真夏 竜, Manatsu Ryū)
- Security guard (33): Sandayū Dokumamushi (毒蝮 三太夫, Dokumamushi Sandayū)
- Evacuee (36): Hidenori Tokuyama (徳山 秀典, Tokuyama Hidenori) (Note: Uncredited.)
- Kazunari Narumiya (成宮 和也, Narumiya Kazunari; 37): Nagare Hagiwara (萩原 流行, Hagiwara Nagare)

== Songs ==
Opening theme

- "Ultraman Max" (ウルトラマンマックス, Urutoraman Makkusu)
  - Lyrics: Neko Oikawa (及川 眠子, Oikawa Neko)
  - Composition & Arrangement: Yasuharu Takanashi (高梨 康治, Takanashi Yasuharu)
  - Artist: TEAM DASH with Project DMM

Insert songs

- "NO LIMITED"
  - Lyrics, Composition, & Arrangement: Kazuya Daimon (大門 一也, Daimon Kazuya)
  - Artist: Project DMM
- "Ultra miracle"
  - Lyrics, composition, arrangement: Daimon Kazuya
  - Artist: Project DMM
- "NOT SO BAD"
  - Lyrics and composition: Yoshihiro Takahashi
  - Arrangement: ACTION
  - Artist: BAD SCANNERS (ACTION)
- "Goodbye song"
  - Arrangement: Kuniaki Kuwashima
- "Chocho"
  - Arrangement: Toru Fuyuki
  - Artist: Yukari Oshima
- "Red Dragonfly"
  - Arrangement: Toru Fuyuki
  - Artist: Yukari Oshima
- "TO THE MAX"
  - Artist: Project DMM
- "Ultraman Max"
  - Artist: Sean Nichols

== Home media ==
In July 2020, Shout! Factory announced to have struck a multi-year deal with Alliance Entertainment and Mill Creek, with the blessings of Tsuburaya and Indigo, that granted them the exclusive SVOD and AVOD digital rights to the Ultra series and films (1,100 TV episodes and 20 films) acquired by Mill Creek the previous year. Ultraman Max, amongst other titles, will stream in the United States and Canada through Shout! Factory TV and Tokushoutsu.

The series was later released in the United States on DVD in January 22, 2023 by Mill Creek Entertainment.
