= Ultra Q: Dark Fantasy =

- Genre: Tokusatsu; Dark Fantasy; Kaiju
- Created by: Tsuburaya Productions
- Developed by: Shozo Uehara
- Directed by: Takeshi Yagi
- Starring: Yoshihiko Hakamada, Kumiko Endo, Masao Kusakari, Shiro Sano
- Country of origin: Japan
- No. of episodes: 26

Production
- Running time: 24 minutes (per episode)
- Production company: Tsuburaya Productions

Original release
- Network: TV Tokyo
- Release: April 7 – September 29, 2004

Related
- Ultraman Cosmos; Ultraman Nexus

the Ultra Q: Dark Fantasy (ウルトラQ dark fantasy, Urutora Kyū: dāku fantajī) is a tokusatsu TV series for midnight series and the eighteenth entry in the Ultra Series that was broadcast in Japan in 2004. It is a remake of Ultra Q, the first entry of the Ultra Series. It retains the same swirling effect for the title card, but with the words "Dark Fantasy" added underneath, the title also remains black and white. The final episode confirmed this is not a sequel; rather, it is another timeline in which the original series is portrayed as a television show.

== Characters ==
- Goichi Sakamoto (Yoshihiko Hakamada): A journalist for Global Magazine's subdivision, MIND Magazine. It covers everything, including the paranormal. Though he is considered eccentric, he is an expert journalist and is good with computers. Ever since he first joined, the magazine's sales have increased at an astronomical level. He was formerly a student of Watarai, and still retains contact.
- Ryo Kusunoki (Kumiko Endo): A 25-year-old freelance photographer who also works for MIND. Though she appears to hate Goichi, she actually respects him a great deal.
- Kakunoshin Watarai (Masao Kusakari): A 54-year-old inventor, and a professor of science at Teito University. He spent some years in Britain, where he found his craving for biscuits and tea. He is knowledgeable in many topics, especially science, history, mythology, and folklore.

== Episode List ==
#	Japanese title	English title	Air Date	Director	Writer
1	踊るガラゴン (Odoru garagon)	Dancing Garagon	7-Apr-04	Takeshi Yagi	Shozo Uehara
2	らくがき (Raku ga ki)	Graffiti	14-Apr-04	Mitsunori Hattori	Aya Takei
3	あなた誰ですか? (Anata daredesuka?)	Who Are You?	21-Apr-04	Shusuke Kaneko	Tamio Hayashi
4	パズルの女 (Pazuru no on'na)	The Puzzle Woman	28-Apr-04	Tsugumi Kitaura	Mitsutaka Hirota
5	ヒエロニムスの下僕 (Hieronimusu no geboku)	The Slave of Hieronymus	5-May-04	Takeshi Yagi	Hiroshi Takashi
6	楽園行き (Rakuen iki)	Bound for Paradise	12-May-04	Mitsunori Hattori	Sadayuki Murai
7	綺亞羅 (Kiara)	Kiara	19-May-04	Shusuke Kaneko	Chiaki Konaka
8	ウニトローダの恩返し (Unitoroda no ongaeshi)	Unitoroda's repayment	26-May-04	Tsugumi Kitaura	Shozo Uehara
9	午前2時の誘惑 (Gozen 2-ji no yuwaku)	Temptation at 2AM	2-Jun-04	Masaki Harada	Takashi Shinohara
10	送り火 (Okuribi)	Ceremonial Bonfire	9-Jun-04	Masaki Harada	Ai Ota
11	トーテムの眼 (Totemu no me)	The Eyes of the Totem	16-Jun-04	Tsugumi Kitaura	Nobuyoshi Shimizu and Masakazu Migita
12	夢見る石 (Yumemiru ishi)	The Dream Stone	23-Jun-04	Norio Tsuruta	Ai Ota
13	影の侵略者 (Kage no shinryaku-sha)	The Invader of Shadows	30-Jun-04	Masaki Harada	Ai Ota
14	李里依とリリー (Ri Rie to riri)	Lily and Lili	7-Jul-04	Norio Tsuruta	Noboru Takagi
15	光る舟 (Hikaru fune)	The Shining Ship	14-Jul-04	Masaki Harada	Ai Ota
16	ガラQの大逆襲 (Gara Q no dai gyakushu)	Gara Q's Revenge	21-Jul-04	Mitsunori Hattori	Shozo Uehara
17	小町 (Komachi)	The Town Beauty	28-Jul-04	Takeshi Yagi	Shozo Uehara
18	後ろの正面 (Ushiro no shomen)	The Front of the Behind	4-Aug-04	Mitsunori Hattori	Aya Takei
19	レンズ越しの恋 (Renzu-goshi no koi)	Love Through a Lens	11-Aug-04	Mitsunori Hattori	Yuji Kobayashi
20	密やかな終幕 (Hisoyakana shumaku)	The Quiet End	18-Aug-04	Iwao Takahashi	Yuuki Okano
21	夜霧よ、今夜も... (Yogiri yo, kon'ya mo...)	The Night Fog, This Evening	25-Aug-04	Takeshi Yagi	Keisuke Fujikawa
22	カネゴンヌの光る径（みち） (Kanegon'nu no hikaru Wataru (michi))	Kanegoneh's Shining Road	1-Sep-04	Atsushi Shimizu	Masahiro Yamada
23	右365度の世界 (Migi 365-do no sekai)	Alice in the 365 Degree World	8-Sep-04	Takeshi Yagi	Sadayuki Murai
24	ヒトガタ (Hitogata)	Hitogata	8-Sep-04	Akio Jissoji	Chiaki Konaka
25	闇 (Yami)	Darkness	15-Sep-04	Akio Jissoji	Chiaki Konaka
26	虚無の扉 (Kyomu no tobira)	The Door to Nothingness	29-Sep-04	Iwao Takahashi	Yuji Kobayashi
