= Ultraman New Generation Stars =

Japanese TV series

- The series poster with the main Ultra Warriors of the New Generation Heroes series (1st season).
- Created by: Tsuburaya Productions
- Opening theme: "STARS" by NEW GENERATION STARS with Voyager; "ULTRA PRIDE" by Yuka Ohta with Voyager; "Zero no Kakusei" by Ultraman Zero (Mamoru Miyano) with Voyager; "We'll be one!" by Ultraman Z (Tasuku Hatanaka) with Voyager
- Country of origin: Japan
- No. of seasons: 4
- No. of episodes: 88

Production
- Running time: 30 minutes
- Production company: Tsuburaya Productions

Original release
- Network: TV Tokyo
- Release: January 28, 2023 – present

Related
- Ultraman Chronicle D

Ultraman New Generation Stars (ウルトラマン ニュージェネレーション スターズ, Urutoraman Nyū Jenerēshon Sutāzu) is a biography series produced by Tsuburaya Productions created to commemorate the 10th anniversary of New Generation Ultraman (ニュージェネレーションウルトラマン, Nyū Jenerēshon Urutoraman) series lineup that started since Ultraman Ginga. The first season premiered on January 28, 2023 on TV Tokyo, effectively a week after the end of Ultraman Decker. The second season was announced to commemorate the 15th anniversary of Ultraman Zero and premiered on January 27, 2024 on TV Tokyo, effectively a week after the end of Ultraman Blazar. The third season premiered on January 25, 2025 on TV Tokyo, effectively a week after the end of Ultraman Arc. The fourth season was announced to commemorate the 60th anniversary for the franchise's and premiered on January 24, 2026 on TV Tokyo, effectively a week after the end of Ultraman Omega.

== Synopsis ==
=== Season 1 ===
As the force of evil reaches the Land of Light in Nebula M78, the record of the New Generation Ultraman became lost. The Dimensionizer (ディメンションナイザー, Dimenshon'naizā) is entrusted to Ultraman Zero, alongside the message which directs him to regain the lost Star Chronicles (スター列伝, Sutā Retsuden) and the bonds with the New Generation Ultras.

=== Season 2 ===
Let's trace the proud record of battles woven by the New Generation Heroes together with Yuka! The genius scientist Yuka Ohta traces the many famous battles of the Ultra Heroes who have ignited the passion of the Ultra Pride, and through this research, she will power up the Special Airborne Armor that has gone through the battle along with Ultraman Z and its fellow members of the anti-monster robot force STORAGE, Sevenger! ... or maybe!?

=== Season 3 ===
The admirable fighter Ultraman Z receives a message from Ultraman Zero, who he admires and considers his master, and ends up on an unknown planet. While the planet seems deserted, he receives a record of Ultra Hero's fights and, in the blink of an eye, as he reaches for a mysterious light, he finds himself wearing the New Generation Ultra Hero Cape (ニュージェネレーションウルトラマンケープ, Nyū Jenerēshon Urutoraman Kēpu)! He follows the path of the New Generation Ultra Heroes and begins his journey towards the future and his personal growth!

=== Season 4 ===
Ultraman Z, who learned about the "bonds between Ultras" on the Planet Ialim, is sent by Ultraman Zero on a new mission with Ultraman Geed! Z and Geed make their way to the place Zero instructed, but when they arrive, they find a mysterious body of energy. When Z touches it, the word "Gamedon," and the image of "a red Ultra" appear in his head. As Z and Geed chase the orb, new "bonds between Ultras" are formed between the New Generation Ultras. The tale of cross-dimensional bonds starts now!

== Episodes ==
Season	Episodes	Originally released	
Season	Episodes	First released	Last released
1	22	January 28, 2023	June 24, 2023
2	22	January 27, 2024	June 22, 2024
3	22	January 25, 2025	June 21, 2025
4	22	January 24, 2026	June 20, 2026

=== Season 1 ===
No.	Title	Original release date
1	"Lost History"; Transliteration: "Rosuto Hisutorī" (Japanese: ロストヒストリー)	January 28, 2023
An unidentified force declares a challenge against the Land of Light residents by erasing all the Ultra Warriors. To counter this, Ultraman Zero is entrusted with the Dimensionizer, an item sent by Ultraman Decker from the future to restore the erased historical records. Z initially appears to take up the role and fails to do so, as Ultraman Ginga explains that Z left himself out from his own recollection. In addition, Zero had mass-produced multiple copies of said device for the entire New Generation Heroes to restore each of their own history records.: This episode is a tribute to all the New Generation Heroes.
2	"Beginning of Ginga: Town of Falling Stars"; Transliteration: "Biginingu Obu Ginga ~Hoshi no Furu Machi~" (Japanese: ビギニング・オブ・ギンガ〜星の降る町〜)	February 4, 2023
Ultraman Ginga (more specifically, Hikaru Raido) recounts the day of his first battle in Mount Furuhoshi that leads to his first battle on Earth. By doing so, he obtains his own card and the record pertaining to Ginga's exploits.: This episode is a tribute to Ultraman Ginga.
3	"Dear Friends"; Transliteration: "Taisetsu na Nakama" (Japanese: 大切な仲間)	February 11, 2023
After fulfilling his duty, Ginga continues to recount his further exploits after that, remembering how his friends from Furuhoshi supported him in his fight and eventually his partnership with the Victorian Sho, who transforms into Ultraman Victory. The latter resulted with the accidental access to Ultraman Victory's card and historical record, prompting Hikaru to contact Sho and begging his forgiveness.: This episode is a tribute to Ultraman Ginga Theater Special, Ultraman Ginga S, Ultraman Geed and Ultraman Z.
4	"Allies in Battle"; Transliteration: "Tomo ni Tatakau Mono-tachi" (Japanese: 共に戦う者たち)	February 18, 2023
Ultraman Z tries to recount his fights on Earth and exploring each of STORAGE's SAA Units that he fought alongside with. Just as he was about to obtain his card, Z went off the rails by further exploring GUTS-Select's exploits both during the era of Trigger and Decker, a fact which Haruki reprimands him off-screen.: This episode is a tribute to Ultraman Z, Ultraman Trigger: New Generation Tiga and Ultraman Decker.
5	"Stand Up, Z! The Last Hero"; Transliteration: "Tachiagare Zetto! ~Saigo no Yūsha~" (Japanese: 立ち上がれゼット！〜最後の勇者〜)	February 25, 2023
Remembering the Ultra Brothers, Z relates to Ace, his godfather and how he arrived to the former's aid during Baraba's attack. His act of doing so manages to unlock his own card and history record from the Dimensionizer.: This episode is a tribute to Ultraman Ace and Ultraman Z.
6	"Trigger's Peril! The Golden Threat"; Transliteration: "Torigā no Kiki! ~Ōgon no Kyōi~" (Japanese: トリガーの危機！〜黄金の脅威〜)	March 4, 2023
Ultraman Trigger is called for help from the Land of Light in restoring his own personal history record. Trigger recounts the day when The Kingdom invades his Earth to steal the powers of Eternity Core to their advantage and how Ultraman Ribut's arrival puts their actions to a temporary stop. By doing so, Trigger unlocks Ribut's card and its accompanying historical record.: This episode is a tribute to Ultraman Trigger: New Generation Tiga and Ultra Galaxy Fight: The Destined Crossroad.
7	"The Ship That Carried Bonds! Operation Dragon"; Transliteration: "Kizuna o Noseta Fune ~Operēshon Doragon~" (Japanese: 絆を乗せた艦〜オペレーションドラゴン〜)	March 11, 2023
Trigger then further dwells into Kengo and Yuna's training session with Ribut's human form to control their powers while GUTS-Select members prepare to exploit Absolute Diavolo's powers for the Nursedessei, all the while the Giants of Darkness provide their own assistance. Trigger then unlocks his own card and the accompanying historical record, assuring that the exploits made by the Ultras as a whole should not be erased.: This episode is a tribute to Ultraman Trigger: New Generation Tiga and Ultra Galaxy Fight: The Destined Crossroad, continuing the events from episode 6.
8	"Enemy Contact!"; Transliteration: "Kaiteki!" (Japanese: 会敵！)	March 18, 2023
With the help of the New Generation Ultras, Ultraman Zero steadily accumulates memories, but that's when the culprit comes into contact. This unforeseen manner of attack reminds Ultraman Zero of his past battles against strong enemies.: This episode is a tribute to Ultraman Zero, Ultraman Ginga S The Movie, Ultraman Z and Ultraman Trigger: Episode Z.
9	"Battle Across Dimensions! When the Aegis Shines"; Transliteration: "Jikū o Koeta Tatakai ~Ījisu Hikaru Toki~" (Japanese: 時空を超えた戦い〜イージス光る時〜)	March 25, 2023
After getting contacted by Ultraman Zero, Ultraman X reminisces on the first time he met Zero. During the transportation of the Spark Dolls, Black King and Alien Nackle Bandello make an appearance. X works with Ultraman Zero, who was going after Bandello, to save their friends from Xio.: This episode is a tribute to Ultraman Zero and Ultraman X.
10	"Interwoven Possibilities"; Transliteration: "Tsumugareta Kanōsei" (Japanese: 紡がれた可能性)	April 1, 2023
X has overcome difficulties in the past with the help of other Ultras like, Max, Ginga, Victory and Tiga. Remember the infinite possibilities that open up with the power of the Ultra bond!: This episode is a tribute to Ultraman, Ultraman Tiga, Ultraman Max, Ultraman Ginga S and Ultraman X.
11	"Words from the Future"; Transliteration: "Mirai kara no Kotoba" (Japanese: 未来からの言葉)	April 8, 2023
After receiving the Dimensionizer, Kanata Asumi was reminiscing about his past battles. That was when the Dimensionizer shot a beam of light and started projecting Ultraman's records it had recovered. What went through Kanata's mind after he saw everything?: This episode is a tribute to Ultraman X, Ultraman Z and Ultraman Decker.
12	"Bonds That Lead to Beyond"; Transliteration: "Kanata e Tsuzuku Kizuna" (Japanese: 彼方へ続く絆)	April 15, 2023
Through the Dimensionizer, Kanata was able to see other Ultras helping each other in battles and it reminded him of the Ultras he had fought together with Trigger is an Ultra who has been fighting since the ancient times. Decker and Dyna are Ultras who fight in the future. The bond that Kanata formed with them unravel the history of the Ultras.: This episode is a tribute to Ultraman Dyna, Ultraman Trigger: New Generation Tiga and Ultraman Decker.
13	"Origin of the Two: From Today We Are Ultraman"; Transliteration: "Futari no Genten ~Urutoraman Hajimemashita~" (Japanese: 二人の原点〜ウルトラマンはじめました〜)	April 22, 2023
The Dimensionizer is also sent to Ultraman Rosso and Ultraman Blu. The way Blu jumps right in to try to figure out what was sent to them hasn't changed a bit from the past. It reminds Rosso of when they had first become Ultraman. Brothers, Katsumi Minato and Isami, get caught up in a monster disaster and were about to face serious danger, when they acquired the power to transform into Ultraman. The Ultraman brothers' battle starts here!: This episode is a tribute to Ultraman R/B.
14	"A Girl Who Fights"; Transliteration: "Tatakau On'na no Ko" (Japanese: 戦う女の子)	April 29, 2023
Having recovered their memories, Rosso and Blu try to help their sister, Ultrawoman Grigio, recover hers as well. Rosso keeps getting side-tracked by his sister—will they be able to reclaim their sister, Asashi's memories from the future?: This episode is a tribute to Ultraman R/B, Ultraman R/B The Movie, Ultra Galaxy Fight: New Generation Heroes and Ultra Galaxy Fight: The Absolute Conspiracy.
15	"Connections Are Circular"; Transliteration: "Tsunagari wa Enkan" (Japanese: 繋がりは円環)	May 6, 2023
Ultraman Orb after receiving the Dimensionizer from Zero, reminisces about the old battles he has fought in the past. He remembers about the battles he fought against the ghost sorcerer, Reibatos and the space witch thief, Murnau and also recalls the time when he first met the members of the SSP. Orb, the wanderer of the galaxy, looks back on the different bonds he's formed in the past.: This episode is a tribute to Ultraman Orb, Ultraman Orb The Movie and Ultra Fight Orb.
16	"An Inescapable Bond"; Transliteration: "Kusareen no Otoko" (Japanese: 腐れ縁の男)	May 13, 2023
While Jugglus Juggler is both a companion and the greatest nemesis of Ultraman Orb, for Z he's a reliable captain. Orb and Z have very different impressions and memories of Jugglus Juggler. Orb and Z unveil the story of this mysterious man.: This episode is a tribute to Ultraman Orb and Ultraman Z.
17	"Time to Get Ready! Welcome to the Secret Base"; Transliteration: "Kimeru ze Kakugo ~Himitsu Kichi e Yōkoso~" (Japanese: 決めるぜ覚悟〜秘密基地へようこそ〜)	May 20, 2023
After receiving the Dimensionizer, Ultraman Geed remembers the first time he transformed. Riku Asakura loses his home after Skull Gomora attacked the city he lived in. Along with his alien partner, Pega, he is lured to a secret base and it was there that he received the Geed Riser and Ultra Capsule. Riku decides to transform into Ultraman Geed to save everyone.: This episode is a tribute to Ultraman Geed.
18	"ShOUT"	May 27, 2023
After sending his Dimension Card to Zero, Ultraman Geed remembers the fierce battles they have fought together. Although they were tough, the two became stronger by overcoming such difficulties. Looking back to those battles brings forth a new Dimension Card for Ultraman Geed.: This episode is a tribute to Ultraman Zero and Ultraman Geed.
19	"The One Place We Seek Together"; Transliteration: "Tomo ni Susumu Basho wa Hitotsu" (Japanese: 共に進む場所は一つ)	June 3, 2023
After receiving the Dimensionizer, Ultraman Taiga reminisces about the members of the Tri-Squad: Ultraman Titas, the Wise Man of Power, and Ultraman Fuma, the Ruler of Wind. In the early days of the Tri-Squad things did not always go smoothly, but eventually over time Taiga formed a tight bond with the members. He thinks back on the numerous battles they overcame together.: This episode is a tribute to Ultraman Taiga and Ultra Galaxy Fight: The Absolute Conspiracy.
20	"The Story of the Fourth Member! Buddy Go!"; Transliteration: "Yo-ninme no Monogatari ~Badi Gō~" (Japanese: 四人目の物語〜バディゴー〜)	June 10, 2023
After acquiring Ultraman Titas and Ultraman Fuma's cards, Ultraman Taiga remembers the time when he first met the fourth member of the Tri-Squad, Hiroyuki Kudo. Hiroyuki works at E.G.I.S., a private security organization on an Earth where aliens secretly inhabit. While he is on duty, he gets involved in an alien-related incident and is forced to face monsters including Hellberus the Ultimate Disaster Monster. That is when the Hero of Light within Hiroyuki is called to awaken!: This episode is a tribute to Ultraman Taiga.
21	"To Every Encounter..."; Transliteration: "Subete no Deai ni......" (Japanese: 全ての出会いに……)	June 17, 2023
Ultraman Zero, who has regained most of the New Generation Ultras' memories, looks back on the battles he has fought. He thinks back on the relationship he has with Ultraman Belial, something that all started because he was young and thoughtless. He also remembers about the time he formed the Ultimate Force Zero with his friends from another universe. He's also reminded of when he finally gained the power of the Ultimate Shining Ultraman Zero, after training with Ultraseven, Ultraman Leo and Ultraman Joneus. Ultraman Zero's power comes from every one of these experiences.: This episode is a tribute to Mega Monster Battle: Ultra Galaxy, Ultraman Zero: The Revenge of Belial, Ultra Zero Fight, Ultraman Saga and Ultra Galaxy Fight: The Destined Crossroad.
22	"To the Future"; Transliteration: "Mirai e" (Japanese: 未来へ)	June 24, 2023
After Ultraman Zero restores all of the memories, the mastermind of the incident appears before him once again. The truth about the whole incident is revealed.: This episode is a tribute to Ultraman Taiga The Movie, Ultraman Trigger: Episode Z and Ultraman Decker.

=== Season 2 ===
No. overall	No. in season	Title	Original release date
23	1	"Sevenger Enhancement Plan"; Transliteration: "Sebungā Kyōka Keikaku" (Japanese: セブンガー強化計画)	January 27, 2024
Special Airborne Armor Unit-1, Sevenger. A masterpiece that has gone through many battles. STORAGE member Yuka Ohta was ordered to submit an enhancement proposal for Sevenger. Will Yuka be able to come up with a good idea by watching the past battle records?: This episode is a tribute to Ultraman Z and Ultraman Trigger: New Generation Tiga.
24	2	"A Treasure Hunter Arrives"; Transliteration: "Torejā Hantā Arawaru" (Japanese: トレジャーハンター現る)	February 3, 2024
A mysterious robot suddenly appears in front of Yuka. It seems there are data of various dimensions inside it. Chasing the robot, came a mysterious young man. He introduced himself as...: This episode is a tribute to Ultraman Ginga, Ultraman Z and Ultraman Trigger: New Generation Tiga.
25	3	"Ignis' Request"; Transliteration: "Igunisu no Irai" (Japanese: イグニスの依頼)	February 10, 2024
In order to obtain the newly genetrated exquisite item, Ignis, a treasure hunter who travels the universe, asked a favor. To achieve that, it seems Yuka must do something...: This episode is a tribute to Ultra Zero Fight, Ultraman Geed and Ultraman Z.
26	4	"Xio's Fierce Battle! A Warrior's Back"; Transliteration: "Jio Gekitō! Senshi no Senaka" (Japanese: Xio激闘！戦士の背中)	February 17, 2024
Ultraman X and the defense team Xio. By watching the records of the battles of them, Yuka learns the necessary mindset to be a defense team member and a warrior fighting for peace.: This episode is a tribute to Ultraman X.
27	5	"Judgementer"; Transliteration: "Jajjimentā" (Japanese: ジャッジメンター)	February 24, 2024
Even among robots, there exist machines that threaten humanity, in stark contrast to the Special Airborne Armor that protect peace. What kind of threat could the machine lifeform Gillvalis, which even fought against STORAGE poses?: This episode is a tribute to Ultraman Orb The Movie, Ultraman Geed, Ultraman Geed The Movie and Ultraman Z.
28	6	"Deploy! The Name Is Earth Garon"; Transliteration: "Shutsugeki! Sono Na wa Āsu Garon" (Japanese: 出撃！その名はアースガロン)	March 2, 2024
A diverse universe born from countless possibilities. Whose hands will the records of the battles between Ultraman and the Defense Team, which have unfolded in one of those possibilities, reach as they transcend time and space?: This episode is a tribute to Ultraman Blazar.
29	7	"Proof of Genius"; Transliteration: "Tensai no Shōmei" (Japanese: 天才の証明)	March 9, 2024
The Defense Team, entrusted with preserving peace, relies heavily on the existence of mechas. Behind the development of these mechas are genius minds shouldering the responsibility. What will their ingenuity, transcending time and space, bring to the troubled Yuka?: This episode is a tribute to Ultraman Ginga S, Ultraman X, Ultra Galaxy Fight: The Absolute Conspiracy and Ultraman Trigger: New Generation Tiga.
30	8	"Yuka in Distress: The Second Robot Activation Plan"; Transliteration: "Yuka no Kunō Ni-gō Robo Kidō Keikaku" (Japanese: ユカの苦悩 二号ロボ起動計画)	March 16, 2024
The remarkable achievements of the Special Airborne Armor. Behind them lie the countless struggles endured by members like Yuka and the crew of STORAGE. The final key to energizing the new Special Airborne Armor Windam rested in Yuka's shift in perspective.: This episode is a tribute to Ultraman Z.
31	9	"Bizarre! Night of Insects Chirping"; Transliteration: "Kaiki! Mushi no Ne no Yoru" (Japanese: 怪奇！虫の音の夜)	March 23, 2024
Amidst the multitude of information traversing through time and space. When the records of Ultraman Blazar's battles, alongside the fighting efforts of SKaRD, once again reach STORAGE, a new Hyper Key shines.: This episode is a tribute to Ultraman Blazar.
32	10	"Heroes' Encounters"; Transliteration: "Eiyū-tachi no Kaikō" (Japanese: 英雄たちの邂逅)	March 30, 2024
Ultraman. They share an incredible bond that transcends even time and space. What can be gleaned from the history of Ultraman's cooperative battles will also lead to the wonderful realizations of Yuka.: This episode is a tribute to Ultraman Ginga S The Movie, Ultraman Trigger: New Generation Tiga and Ultraman Decker.
33	11	"Challenge from the Extradimensional Being"; Transliteration: "Ijigen-jin no Chōsen" (Japanese: 異次元人の挑戦)	April 6, 2024
An entity that has been in conflict with Ultraman for a long time. It is a messenger from a dimension where human common sense does not apply at all. Its grudge has created a threat beyond monsters, giving rise to Terrible-Monsters and continuing to erode peace.: This episode is a tribute to Ultraman Zero Side Story: Killer the Beatstar, Ultra Fight Victory, Ultraman Geed and Ultraman Z.
34	12	"The Unbreakable Spirit: Bond -Unite-"; Transliteration: "Akiramenai Kokoro Kizuna -Yunaito-" (Japanese: 諦めない心 絆 -Unite-)	April 13, 2024
The light that humans possess. It nurtures various possibilities and has brought forth miracles. The hope that descended before Ultraman X was none other than the light of humans embodying miracles.: This episode is a tribute to Ultraman Nexus and Ultraman X.
35	13	"Darkness Heels"; Transliteration: "Dākunesu Hīruzu" (Japanese: ダークネスヒールズ)	April 20, 2024
The adversaries that have confronted the Ultra heroes harbor diverse and often nefarious intentions. What were they aiming for, exactly? And what does Yuka, who witnessed it, feel about it?: This episode is a tribute to Ultraman Ginga Theater Special, Ultraman Geed, Ultraman Taiga and Ultraman Z.
36	14	"Individual Paths: So That I Can Be Me"; Transliteration: "Sorezore no Michi Boku ga Boku de Aru Koto" (Japanese: それぞれの道 僕が僕であること)	April 27, 2024
Each person has their own position and role to fulfill. Who taught this to Yuka, were none other than the warrior of light who resisted fate and a salaryman who toiled with sweat dripping down their brows.: This episode is a tribute to Ultraman Geed.
37	15	"Shape of the Heart: Nebula House Invasion"; Transliteration: "Kokoro no Katachi Ubawareta Seiun-sō" (Japanese: ココロのカタチ 奪われた星雲荘)	May 4, 2024
Does highly developed artificial intelligence possess a soul? Let's contemplate this profound question through the actions of the AI character REM, as depicted in Ultraman Geed.: This episode is a tribute to Ultraman Geed.
38	16	"Orchestra of Imposters"; Transliteration: "Nisemono no Ōkesutora" (Japanese: ニセモノのオーケストラ)	May 11, 2024
Aliens who disguise themselves as Ultras and robots created to mimic Ultras abilities. Let's learn about the impostors who pose a threat by being the exact opposite of understanding the real thing.: This episode is a tribute to Mega Monster Battle: Ultra Galaxy, Ultra Galaxy Legend Side Story: Ultraman Zero vs. Darklops Zero, Ultraman Orb and Ultraman R/B.
39	17	"Defeat the Robot Army! The Lone Warrior"; Transliteration: "Taose Robotto Gundan! Kokō no Senshi" (Japanese: 倒せロボット軍団！孤高の戦士)	May 18, 2024
The approaching mechanical army. Their relentless power, devoid of will, sometimes overwhelms even the Ultras. How will Ginga and Victory confront the sheer volume of this threat?: This episode is a tribute to Ultraman Ginga S.
40	18	"Complete? The Sevenger Enhancement Plan"; Transliteration: "Kansei? Sebungā Kyōka Puran" (Japanese: 完成？セブンガー強化プラン)	May 25, 2024
A reliable force that has fought alongside STORAGE, the Special Airborne Armor. From the combat data of the Special Airborne Armor, which has endured numerous battles, Yuka finally may extract the answer...?: This episode is a tribute to Ultraman R/B and Ultraman Z.
41	19	"A Forbidden Weapon?! Split! UPG"; Transliteration: "Kindan no Heiki!? Bunretsu! Yū Pī Jī" (Japanese: 禁断の兵器！？分裂！UPG)	June 1, 2024
The enhancement plan for Sevenger is finally completed. While Yuka presses forward towards its realization, Ediom, standing by, seems to be feeling uneasy. What could be the reason for this...?: This episode is a tribute to Ultraman Ginga S.
42	20	"False Hope That Bares Its Fangs"; Transliteration: "Kiba o Muku Itsuwari no Kibō" (Japanese: 牙を剥く偽りの希望)	June 8, 2024
The strengthening power to protect peace. However, if misused, it could become a weapon of demonic proportions that threatens that very peace. Are humans doomed to repeat the same history?: This episode is a tribute to Ultraman Z and Ultraman Decker.
43	21	"What It Means to Have Power"; Transliteration: "Chikara o Motsu Toiu Koto" (Japanese: 力を持つということ)	June 15, 2024
Yuka, burdened by the revealed truth, falls into despair. It's then that Ignis returns to her. What new truth does he bring, and what seeds does it plant within Yuka's heart?: This episode is a tribute to Ultraman Trigger: New Generation Tiga and Ultraman Trigger: Episode Z.
44	22	"Ultra Pride"; Transliteration: "Urutora Puraido" (Japanese: ウルトラプライド)	June 22, 2024
Throughout all time and space, warriors have fought with pride until the very end. Witnessing their battles, Yuka finally arrives at an answer.: This episode is a tribute to Ultraman Ginga S, Ultraman X and Ultraman Z.

=== Season 3 ===
No. overall	No. in season	Title	Original release date
45	1	"A Summons from Master Zero"; Transliteration: "Zero-shishō kara no Shōshū" (Japanese: ゼロ師匠からの招集)	January 25, 2025
Ultraman Z has faced countless harsh battles. He now receives a message from Ultraman Zero. As Z arrives on planet Ialim, he is suddenly bathed in a mysterious light and changed into a new form! Why is he on planet Ialim, and what awaits him there?: This episode is a tribute to Ultra Galaxy Legend Side Story: Ultraman Zero vs. Darklops Zero, Ultra Galaxy Fight: The Absolute Conspiracy and Ultra Galaxy Fight: The Destined Crossroad.
46	2	"The Guided Hero"; Transliteration: "Michibikareshi Eiyū" (Japanese: 導かれし英雄)	February 1, 2025
Ultraman Z has arrived on planet Ialim. There, he looks back fondly at the achievements of his mentor, Ultraman Zero. But then, a new sphere of light appears! What is it, and why has it appeared in front of him?: This episode is a tribute to Mega Monster Battle: Ultra Galaxy, Ultraman Saga and Ultra Zero Fight.
47	3	"Meeting a Partner: I Ask That You Chant My Name!"; Transliteration: "Aibō to no Deai Goshōwa Kudasai, Ware no Na o!" (Japanese: 相棒との出会い ご唱和ください、我の名を！)	February 8, 2025
Ultraman Z now has the New Generation Ultra Hero Cape, but to wear it, he must first understand the bond between the Ultra Heroes. There's a lot for Ediom to cover regarding the Ultra Heroes' history, but to start things off Z will first revisit and further understand the beginnings of himself.: This episode is a tribute to Ultraman Z.
48	4	"Battle Across Dimensions: When the Aegis Shines"; Transliteration: "Jikū o Koeta Tatakai Ījisu Hikaru Toki" (Japanese: 時空を超えた戦い イージス光る時)	February 15, 2025
Z wants to expand his understanding about the other Ultra Heroes, so Ediom presents him with Ultraman X's data. Ultraman X and Zero have a tight bond and have fought together. What will Z learn from their teamwork?: This episode is a tribute to Ultraman X and Ultra Galaxy Fight: The Destined Crossroad.
49	5	"Those Who Don Armor"; Transliteration: "Yoroi Matoishi Mono" (Japanese: 鎧纏し者)	February 22, 2025
After seeing Ultraman X's armor, Ultraman Z becomes curious about the various armors worn by other New Generation Ultras. By exploring the armors' powers, what will Z learn about the Ultra Heroes themselves?: This episode is a tribute to Ultraman X, Ultraman X The Movie and Ultraman Arc.
50	6	"Vessels of Light"; Transliteration: "Hikari ga Yadoru Utsuwa" (Japanese: 光が宿る器)	March 1, 2025
Ultraman Z gazes at the Ultra Z Riser that connects him with Haruki Natsukawa. He learns it's not the only item that forms bonds with Ultra Heroes, there are as many of them as there are heroes. Z also comes to understand the meaning of the bonds each item contains.: This episode is a tribute to Ultraman Ginga, Ultraman Taiga, Ultraman Z, Ultra Galaxy Fight: The Absolute Conspiracy and Ultra Galaxy Fight: The Destined Crossroad.
51	7	"Beliarok Appears! A Hero's Duty"; Transliteration: "Beriaroku Arawaru! Senshi no Shimei" (Japanese: ベリアロク現る！戦士の使命)	March 8, 2025
Beliarok, the phantasmic magic sword, suddenly appears before Ediom and Ultraman Z on Planet Ialim. With its arrival, Ediom learns how the sentient sword came to be. Earth was facing a desperate crisis. What a terrifying tale...: This episode is a tribute to Ultraman Z.
52	8	"Phantasmic Magic Sword"; Transliteration: "Genkai Maken" (Japanese: 幻界魔剣)	March 15, 2025
The sentient sword Beliarok doesn't let its wielder decide what it slices and pays no mind to whether they are on the side of light, or darkness. Ultraman Z looks back on Beliarok's exploits. What new knowledge will he gain?: This episode is a tribute to Ultraman Z, Ultraman Trigger: New Generation Tiga and Ultra Galaxy Fight: The Destined Crossroad.
53	9	"Heroes' United Front: The Light of Hope from the Red Planet"; Transliteration: "Eiyū no Kyōtō Kibō no Hikari, Akaki Hoshi yori" (Japanese: 英雄の共闘 希望の光、赤き星より)	March 22, 2025
Ediom had heard about Ultraman Trigger from Ignis. Seven years later, a new hero inherits the light Trigger had nurtured. His name is Ultraman Decker. When Trigger and Decker assemble, it is to stand against a great peril.: This episode is a tribute to Ultraman Trigger: New Generation Tiga and Ultraman Decker.
54	10	"A New Bond: Light and Darkness, Again"; Transliteration: "Arata na Kizuna Hikari to Yami, Futatabi" (Japanese: 新たな絆 光と闇、ふたたび)	March 29, 2025
Ultraman Trigger and Ultraman Decker team up against an enemy. The consciousness hidden within it leads light and darkness to the next stage. When Z learns this, something begins to grow in his heart, giving him a deeper understanding of bonds.: This episode is a tribute to Ultraman Decker.
55	11	"The Will That the Blade Nurtures"; Transliteration: "Yaiba ga Hagukumu Omoi" (Japanese: 刃が育む想い)	April 5, 2025
Beliarok, the Phantasmic Magic Sword, is bored and bothers Z with its childish behavior. Ediom, unable to stand this sight, proposes examining data on other Ultra Heroes' weapons. Z learns the hidden intent that makes each Ultra swing their blades.: This episode is a tribute to Ultraman Orb, Ultraman R/B, Ultraman Taiga and Ultraman Blazar.
56	12	"Ultraman Zero The Movie: The Fighting Bird"; Transliteration: "Urutoraman Zero Za Mūbī ~Tatakau Tori~" (Japanese: ウルトラマンゼロ THE MOVIE ～戦う鳥～)	April 12, 2025
On his way to spar with Ultraman Blazar, Beliarok runs into Ultraman Zero. Zero refuses Beliarok's challenge to fight saying it would bring back bad memories of his fated nemesis and the battles he fought against him. However...: This episode is a tribute to Ultraman Zero: The Revenge of Belial.
57	13	"Ultraman Zero The Movie: Burning Magma"; Transliteration: "Urutoraman Zero Za Mūbī ~Moeru Maguma~" (Japanese: ウルトラマンゼロ THE MOVIE ～燃えるマグマ～)	April 19, 2025
Beliarok demands to hear the rest of Ultraman Zero's battles, who obliges. Zero and his companions begin their search for the Shield of Baradhi so they can overpower the Belial Army. However, someone is waiting for them...a hot-headed space pirate who desires freedom.: This episode is a tribute to Ultraman Zero: The Revenge of Belial.
58	14	"Ultraman Zero The Movie: The Shadow Standing in the Light"; Transliteration: "Urutoraman Zero Za Mūbī ~Hikari no Naka ni Tatsu Kage wa~" (Japanese: ウルトラマンゼロ THE MOVIE ～光の中に立つ影は～)	April 26, 2025
Zero and his friends arrive on the Planet of Mirrors they learned of from Glenfire. There, they find a miserable sight. The noble Mirror Knight has fallen prey to Belial's darkness. Meanwhile, Belial's dark hand draws closer to Ultraman Zero...!: This episode is a tribute to Ultraman Zero: The Revenge of Belial.
59	15	"Ultraman Zero The Movie: To Bear the Light"; Transliteration: "Urutoraman Zero Za Mūbī ~Hikari o Seotte~" (Japanese: ウルトラマンゼロ THE MOVIE ～光を背負って～)	May 3, 2025
After rescuing Mirror Knight, Zero finally faces off against Kaiser Belial. However, Belial still has a trick up his sleeve, driving Zero into a corner. What new power will Zero gain? The final showdown against his fated nemesis begins!: This episode is a tribute to Ultraman Zero: The Revenge of Belial.
60	16	"No Matter the Bond"; Transliteration: "Don'na Tsunagari demo......" (Japanese: どんな繋がりでも……)	May 10, 2025
Ultraman Geed appears before Beliarok and Zero. He tells them that his destiny was connected to the story between Zero and Belial. This sparks Beliarok's curiosity and he asks Geed to talk about his past battles. In response, Geed starts with something he seems to have overcome...: This episode is a tribute to Ultraman Geed.
61	17	"The Man Returns! Defeat Gillvalis!"; Transliteration: "Kaettekita Otoko! Girubarisu o Kōryaku Seyo!" (Japanese: 帰ってきた男！ギルバリスを攻略せよ！)	May 17, 2025
Beliarok appears before Z and Ediom once more and tells them of his encounter with Zero and Geed. Z recalls the fight against Gillvalis, where he and Geed first met.: This episode is a tribute to Ultraman Z.
62	18	"The Targeted Genes: His Majesty's Medal"; Transliteration: "Nerawareta Idenshi Heika no Medaru" (Japanese: 狙われた遺伝子 陛下のメダル)	May 24, 2025
Riku is suddenly kidnapped from STORAGE HQ. Haruki and the others rush to his rescue but a formidable enemy appears. Z and Geed are put in an impossible situation! What will happen to them? Plus, the hero shows up late?!: This episode is a tribute to Ultraman Z.
63	19	"Ultra Galaxy Fight: New Generation Heroes Episode 1"; Transliteration: "Urutora Gyarakushī Faito Nyū Jenerēshon Hīrōzu Episōdo Wan" (Japanese: ウルトラギャラクシーファイト ニュージェネレーションヒーローズ エピソード１)	May 31, 2025
Looking back on heroes' past battles, Z questions his purpose. Seeing him like this, Ediom shows Z a fight that brought the New Generation Ultras together!: This episode is a tribute to Ultra Galaxy Fight: New Generation Heroes.
64	20	"Ultra Galaxy Fight: New Generation Heroes Episode 2"; Transliteration: "Urutora Gyarakushī Faito Nyū Jenerēshon Hīrōzu Episōdo Tsū" (Japanese: ウルトラギャラクシーファイト ニュージェネレーションヒーローズ エピソード２)	June 7, 2025
The New Generation Heroes head for Planet Tenebris to save Zero and Grigio, who are trapped there. But old, powerful enemies and the Darkness Copies back them into a corner. How will they break through?: This episode is a tribute to Ultra Galaxy Fight: New Generation Heroes.
65	21	"Ultra Galaxy Fight: New Generation Heroes Episode 3"; Transliteration: "Urutora Gyarakushī Faito Nyū Jenerēshon Hīrōzu Episōdo Surī" (Japanese: ウルトラギャラクシーファイト ニュージェネレーションヒーローズ エピソード３)	June 14, 2025
The New Generation Heroes break out of a bad situation with the power of their bonds! However, another enemy from the past returns... In the midst of this fierce battle, Ultraman Zero powers up with a new form. At last, the final showdown begins!: This episode is a tribute to Ultra Galaxy Fight: New Generation Heroes.
66	22	"What Is Passed Down"; Transliteration: "Kataritsugareteiku Mono" (Japanese: 語り継がれていくもの)	June 21, 2025
Watching the Ultra Heroes' fights, Z seems to have found the meaning of Ultras' bonds. Ediom begins to reveal the answer. But what answer did Z find...?: This episode is a tribute to Ultraman Ginga S The Movie, Ultraman R/B, Ultra Galaxy Fight: The Destined Crossroad and Ultraman Regulos.

=== Season 4 ===
No. overall	No. in season	Title	Original release date
67	1	"The Order They Were Given"; Transliteration: "Futari ni Kudatta Shirei" (Japanese: 二人に下った指令)	January 24, 2026
Ultraman Z and Geed are given a new order. That order is to cross space and time to track a mysterious energy that has appeared. What will they find waiting for them there? A new tale involving many Ultras begins.: This episode is a tribute to Mega Monster Battle: Ultra Galaxy, Ultraman Ginga, Ultraman Ginga S, Ultraman X, Ultraman Orb, Ultraman Geed, Ultraman R/B The Movie and Ultraman Taiga.
68	2	"The Unknown Hero"; Transliteration: "Mada Minu Eiyū" (Japanese: まだ見ぬ英雄)	January 31, 2026
Z and Geed meet a mysterious being called Gamedon. Gamedon contains vast amounts of data on things the two don't know. They are invited into a space that shows images of things they can't get their heads around, and there they see a strange, red Ultra. Could he be connected to Gamedon?: This episode is a tribute to Ultra Fight Orb, Ultraman Z, Ultraman Trigger: New Generation Tiga, Ultraman Decker and Ultraman Arc.
69	3	"The House of Barossa: Hang in There, Meteokaiju!"; Transliteration: "Barossa no Ie Ganbare Meteokaijū!" (Japanese: バロッサの家 がんばれメテオカイジュウ！)	February 7, 2026
Z and Geed discover that Gamedon contains data on many Ultras. When Gamedon shows Omega's Meteo, they get a glimpse of an Omega episode, and Z sees the Meteokaijus struggling against a familiar face. Just what is Gamedon? And who is its owner...?: This episode is a tribute to Ultraman Omega.
70	4	"Omega's Armor"; Transliteration: "Omega no Yoroi" (Japanese: オメガの鎧)	February 14, 2026
Having seen his battle, Z and Geed learn of the existence of the kaijus that fight alongside Omega, and Geed guesses that Gamedon is one of them. As it turns out, the trusty Meteokaijus can also give power directly to Omega. What will Z and Geed make of that?: This episode is a tribute to Ultraman X and Ultraman Omega.
71	5	"The Birth of Arc! Unleash Your Imagination!"; Transliteration: "Āku Tanjō! Sōzōryoku o Tokihanate!" (Japanese: アーク誕生！想像力を解き放て！)	February 21, 2026
Z follows Gamedon across space and time, where he meets Ultraman Arc. As Z hears the tale of this hero born of the power of imagination, he makes several realizations.: This episode is a tribute to Ultraman Arc.
72	6	"The Transcending Wish: Here Comes Blazar!"; Transliteration: "Koeru Omoi Burēzā Tōjō!" (Japanese: 超える想い ブレーザー登場！)	February 28, 2026
Shrouded in light, the New Generation Ultraman Brooch comes to Arc. The other dimension that Arc had visited in the past: it is said that there was an Ultra who protects life. What is the meaning of the power that brought Arc and Blazar together?: This episode is a tribute to Ultraman Arc.
73	7	"Pierced by a Star"; Transliteration: "Hoshi ni Inukarete" (Japanese: 星に射抜かれて)	March 7, 2026
Ultraman Z and Ultraman Arc are in Gamedon's dimension when suddenly the Blazar Meteo appears, and new information about Ultraman Blazar is revealed to the two. As Z is trying to come to terms with just how little he actually knows, he encounters...: This episode is a tribute to Ultraman Blazar and Ultraman Arc.
74	8	"Reunion: The Propagating Invasion"; Transliteration: "Saikai ~Hanshoku Suru Shinryaku~" (Japanese: 再会 ～繁殖する侵略～)	March 14, 2026
Ultraman Z had a new encounter after being led to a new place. He parted with Ultraman Blazar and headed to another universe. When he arrives, he is told a tale of a joint battle. Once again, Z thinks about how this space's past is linked to the future.: This episode is a tribute to Ultraman Trigger: New Generation Tiga.
75	9	"Champions Who Cross Paths: Heroes on the Moon"; Transliteration: "Kōsaku Suru Eiyū Getsumen no Senshi-tachi" (Japanese: 交錯する英雄 月面の戦士たち)	March 21, 2026
Having followed Gamedon on journey after journey, Z is reunited with Ultraman Trigger. Together they encounter yet another new light. Trigger tells him about the repeated battles he fought against their nemesis alongside other heroes; another tale of camaraderie in battle.: This episode is a tribute to Ultraman Decker.
76	10	"Those Who Wish and Those Who Protect"; Transliteration: "Negau Mono to Mamoru Mono" (Japanese: 願う者と守る者)	March 28, 2026
Ultraman Z says farewell to Ultraman Trigger and Ultraman Decker and follows Gamedon to yet another new destination. Up until now the information that Gamedon has shared with him has been full of mysteries. As Z is finally starting to uncover the truth, a certain Ultra suddenly appears!: This episode is a tribute to Ultraman Z, Ultra Galaxy Fight: The Absolute Conspiracy and Ultraman Omega.
77	11	"The Star-Seeker Who Became the Light"; Transliteration: "Hoshi o Mite Hikari ni Naru" (Japanese: 星を見て光に成る)	April 4, 2026
Ultraman Z meets Ultraman Omega in a way he never would have dreamed of. Omega tells him the truth about Space Gazers. He also tells Z about the irreplaceable friend he made on Earth.: This episode is a tribute to Ultraman Omega.
78	12	"Absolutian"; Transliteration: "Abusoryūtian" (Japanese: アブソリューティアン)	April 11, 2026
While Ultraman Z is following Gamedon, Ultraman Geed is heading to the Galaxy Rescue Force. Why does he want to visit Ribut and Regulos...?: This episode is a tribute to Ultra Galaxy Fight: The Absolute Conspiracy, Ultra Galaxy Fight: The Destined Crossroad and Ultraman Regulos.
79	13	"Demon Invasion: The Golden Threat"; Transliteration: "Akuma Shūrai Ōgon no Kyōi" (Japanese: 悪魔襲来 黄金の脅威)	April 18, 2026
In The Kingdom live those holding similar powers to the Ultras from the Land of Light. Fate is revealed by Ribut, who had encountered Absolute Diavolo in the past. A memory of a planet protected by an ancient hero.: This episode is a tribute to Ultraman Trigger: New Generation Tiga.
80	14	"Operation Dragon: Defeat the Golden Demon"; Transliteration: "Operēshon Doragon Ōgon no Akuma o Kōryaku Seyo" (Japanese: オペレーションドラゴン 黄金の悪魔を攻略せよ)	April 25, 2026
Ultraman Trigger heads towards the raging Absolute Diavolo. Faced with a powerful foe, it's time to use the secret strategy passed to him by Ribut. And what decision did GUTS-SELECT make?: This episode is a tribute to Ultraman Trigger: New Generation Tiga.
81	15	"Burn! Ultraman Regulos: First Mission"; Transliteration: "Moero! Urutoraman Regurosu Fāsuto Misshon" (Japanese: 燃えろ！ウルトラマンレグロス ファーストミッション)	May 2, 2026
Ultraman Regulos: the one who inherited Cosmo Beast Style. He, too, has a past incident he must recount. The story of his first mission upon entering the Galaxy Rescue Force. A great evil was resurrected, and Regulos shows it his resuce spirit...: This episode is a tribute to Ultraman Geed and Ultraman Regulos: First Mission.
82	16	"Gamedon's Data: Standing Tall for Someone Special"; Transliteration: "Gamedon no Dēta Taga Tame no Yūshi" (Japanese: ガメドンのデータ 誰がための勇姿)	May 9, 2026
After meeting Ultraman Omega, Z returns to his original dimension. There, he meets Ultraman Geed, who can't hide his surprise that Z has brought Omega with him. The next information that Gamedon reveals is about Ultraman Decker, an Ultra who boldly faces the future and pushes on, and his heated battles alongside his friends.: This episode is a tribute to Ultraman Decker.
83	17	"From the World of Darkness"; Transliteration: "Yami no Sekai yori" (Japanese: 闇の世界より)	May 16, 2026
Gamedon contains data about many different dimensions. Recordings of hero veterans. However, where there is light there is darkness too, and these records are no different. Ultraman Belial and Ultraman Tregear. What does Omega think of these dark beings...?: This episode is a tribute to Ultraman Geed, Ultraman Taiga, Ultraman Trigger: New Generation Tiga, Ultraman Trigger: Episode Z and Ultraman Arc The Movie: The Clash of Light and Evil.
84	18	"In Flames: Hard-Boiled River"; Transliteration: "Honō no Naka de Hādoboirudo Ribā" (Japanese: 炎の中で ハードボイルドリバー)	May 23, 2026
Flame, water, wind, ground. Z and Geed speak of Ultraman Orb, who harnesses the power of nature. With a swing of his sword, the Orb Calibur, he can release the power of the four elements. This piques Omega's interest.: This episode is a tribute to Ultraman Orb.
85	19	"Showdown! The 10 Ultra Warriors! Chapter of Spacetime"; Transliteration: "Chō Kessen! Urutora Jū Yūshi!! Jikū no Shō" (Japanese: 超決戦! ウルトラ10勇士!! 時空の章)	May 30, 2026
Ultraman Omega's Gamedon Armor allows him to cross dimensions. Z knows of one other armor that holds the same power. Omega is excited to learn about new abilities. The other armor that he learns about is...: This episode is a tribute to Ultraman Ginga S The Movie.
86	20	"Showdown! The 10 Ultra Warriors! Chapter of Bond"; Transliteration: "Chō Kessen! Urutora Jū Yūshi!! Kizuna no Shō" (Japanese: 超決戦! ウルトラ10勇士!! 絆の章)	June 6, 2026
Z continues the tale of Etelgar, the Super Dimensional Demon running rampant. To face such a formidable foe, Hikaru and Sho must unite their hearts as one. As their bond is put to the ultimate test, a new hero descends. And his form is...: This episode is a tribute to Ultraman Ginga S The Movie.
87	21	"Showdown! The 10 Ultra Warriors! Chapter of Hero"; Transliteration: "Chō Kessen! Urutora Jū Yūshi!! Eiyū no Shō" (Japanese: 超決戦! ウルトラ10勇士!! 英雄の章)	June 13, 2026
The Ultra Heroes assemble! Standing in their way are powerful enemies from the past. Can Hikaru and Sho seize glory? Each and every battle will become the light that guides the way to the future.: This episode is a tribute to Ultraman Ginga S The Movie.
88	22	"You're an Ultra, Too"; Transliteration: "Kimi mo Urutoraman" (Japanese: 君もウルトラマン)	June 20, 2026
No matter the odds or the strength of the enemy, they shall never be defeated. For the Ultras are the eternal champions of peace. Now, a mighty foe descends before Z, Geed, and Omega. Believing in a peaceful tomorrow, they fight on.: This episode is a tribute to Ultraman Ginga S, Ultra Fight Victory, Ultraman Geed, Ultraman Z and Ultraman Regulos.

== Exclusive characters ==
- Ediom (エディオム, Ediomu; (S1-S3)): An artificial intelligence who was created by the inhabitants of Planet Ialim (惑星イアリム, Wakusei Iarimu) tens of millions of years prior to gather data on various civilizations for research purposes, including records of all the Ultra Heroes' battles so far. Seeing civilizations crumble upon reaching their end, Ediom initially erases archived data from the Land of Light as a challenge to its inhabitants, only for the collective New Generation Heroes to restore it with their recollection of memories. Ediom would later recognize their efforts and continues his mission to observe civilizations after making peace with Ultraman Zero. He later uses a robot body, and temporarily used a fake identity as Mountain Gulliver II-V (マウンテンガリバーII-V, Maunten Garibā Tsū Faibu).
- Gamedon (ガメドン, (S4)): A Black Turtle-Snake-themed Meteokaiju that can transform from Kaiju Mode to Buster Mode (バスターモード, Basutā Mōdo) to give Ultraman Omega access to his Gamedon Armor (ガメドンアーマー, Gamedon Āmā) form clad in a green-colored armor that grants him the Gamedon Buster (ガメドンバスター, Gamedon Basutā) crossbow. It specializes in intel gathering and has the power to traverse dimensions. Like Ediom, it has records of all the Ultra Heroes' battles so far. Omega's Gamedon Armor form made its first appearance in Ultra Heroes Expo 2026 New Year Festival in Tokyo Dome City before its debut in the tv show.

== Cast ==
- Kanata Asumi (アスミ カナタ, Asumi Kanata; 11, 12 (S1)), Ultraman Decker (ウルトラマンデッカー, Urutoraman Dekkā; Voice, 11, 12 (S1), 8, 9 (S4)): Hiroki Matsumoto (松本 大輝, Matsumoto Hiroki)
- Yuka Ohta (オオタ ユカ, Ōta Yuka; (S2)): Hikari Kuroki (黒木 ひかり, Kuroki Hikari)
- Ignis (イグニス, Igunisu; S2): Kei Hosogai (細貝 圭, Hosogai Kei)

=== Voice cast ===
- Ultraman Zero (ウルトラマンゼロ, Urutoraman Zero; 8, 9, 18, 21, 22 (S1), (S3)): Mamoru Miyano (宮野 真守, Miyano Mamoru)
- Ultraman Ginga (ウルトラマンギンガ, Urutoraman Ginga; 1-3 (S1)): Takuya Negishi (根岸 拓哉, Negishi Takuya)
- Ultraman X (ウルトラマンエックス, Urutoraman Ekkusu; 9, 10 (S1)): Yuichi Nakamura (中村 悠一, Nakamura Yūichi)
- Ultraman Orb (ウルトラマンオーブ, Urutoraman Ōbu; 15, 16 (S1)): Hideo Ishiguro (石黒 英雄, Ishiguro Hideo)
- Ultraman Geed (ウルトラマンジード, Urutoraman Jīdo; 17, 18 (S1), 15, 16 (S3), (S4)): Tatsuomi Hamada (濱田 龍臣, Hamada Tatsuomi)
- Ultraman Rosso (ウルトラマンロッソ, Urutoraman Rosso; 13, 14 (S1)): Yuya Hirata (平田 雄也, Hirata Yūya)
- Ultraman Blu (ウルトラマンブル, Urutoraman Buru; 13, 14 (S1)): Ryosuke Koike (小池 亮介, Koike Ryōsuke)
- Ultraman Taiga (ウルトラマンタイガ, Urutoraman Taiga; 19, 20 (S1)): Takuma Terashima (寺島 拓篤, Terashima Takuma)
- Ultraman Z (ウルトラマンゼット, Urutoraman Zetto; 1, 4, 5, 16 (S1), (S3), (S4)): Tasuku Hatanaka (畠中 祐, Hatanaka Tasuku)
- Ultraman Trigger (ウルトラマントリガー, Urutoraman Torigā; 6, 7 (S1), 8, 9 (S4)): Raiga Terasaka (寺坂 頼我, Terasaka Raiga)
- Ediom (S1-S3): Kensuke Nishi (西 健亮, Nishi Kensuke)
- Mountain Gulliver II-V (S2): Chiya Nishimura (西村 千夜, Nishimura Chiya)
- AI voice (S2): Katsumi Fukuhara (福原 かつみ, Fukuhara Katsumi)
- Beliarok (ベリアロク, Beriaroku; (S3)): Yūki Ono (小野 友樹, Ono Yūki)
- Preview narration (S3): Yutaka Harasawa (原沢 侑高, Harasawa Yutaka)
- Ultraman Blazar (ウルトラマンブレーザー, Urutoraman Burēzā; 7 (S4)): Hideyoshi Iwata (岩田 栄慶, Iwata Hideyoshi)
- Ultraman Arc (ウルトラマンアーク, Urutoraman Āku; 4-7 (S4)): Yuki Totsuka (戸塚 有輝, Totsuka Yūki)
- Ultraman Omega (ウルトラマンオメガ, Urutoraman Omega; S4): Shori Kondo (近藤 頌利, Kondō Shōri)
- Kosei Hoshimi (ホシミ コウセイ, Hoshimi Kōsei; 11 (S4)): Haruto Yoshida (吉田 晴登, Yoshida Haruto)
- Ultraman Ribut (ウルトラマンリブット, Urutoraman Ributto; 12-15 (S4)): Wataru Komada (駒田 航, Komada Wataru)
- Ultraman Regulos (ウルトラマンレグロス, Urutoraman Regurosu; 12-15 (S4)): Shugo Nakamura (仲村 宗悟, Nakamura Shūgo)
- Yapool (ヤプール, Yapūru; 9, 22 (S4)): Katsuya Shōji (ショージ カツヤ, Shōji Katsuya)
- Preview narration (S4): Munetoshi Takubo (田久保 宗稔, Takubo Munetoshi)

== Theme songs ==
Season 1

- "STARS"
  - Lyrics: TAKERU, Chiaki Seshimo (瀬下 千晶, Seshimo Chiaki)
  - Composition & Arrangement: Takao Konishi (小西 貴雄, Konishi Takao)
  - Artist: NEW GENERATION STARS with Voyager
  - Episodes: 1-5, 8-12, 17, 18, 21 (Verse 1); 6, 7, 13-16, 19, 20, 22 (Verse 2)

Season 2

- "ULTRA PRIDE"
  - Lyrics: TAKERU, Chiaki Seshimo
  - Composition & Arrangement: Takao Konishi
  - Artist: Yuka Ohta with Voyager

Season 3

- "Zero no Kakusei" (ゼロの覚醒; "Awakening of ZERO")
  - Lyrics & Composition: Toshihiko Takamizawa (高見沢 俊彦, Takamizawa Toshihiko)
  - Arrangement: Toshihiko Takamizawa with Yuichiro Honda (本田 優一郎, Honda Yūichirō)
  - Artist: Ultraman Zero (Mamoru Miyano) with Voyager

Season 4

- "We'll be one!"
  - Lyrics: TAKERU, Chiaki Seshimo
  - Composition & Arrangement: Takao Konishi
  - Artist: Ultraman Z (Tasuku Hatanaka) with Voyager
