= Hosogai =

Hosogai (written: 細貝) is a Japanese surname. Notable people with the surname include:

- Hajime Hosogai (細貝 萌, born 1986), Japanese footballer
- Kei Hosogai (細貝 圭, born 1984), Japanese actor and musician
