= Ultraman Trigger: Episode Z =

- Theatrical movie poster

Japanese name
- Kanji: ウルトラマントリガー エピソードZ
Transcriptions
- Revised Hepburn: Urutoraman Torigā Episōdo Zetto
- Directed by: Masayoshi Takesue
- Written by: Toshizo Nemoto
- Based on: Ultraman Trigger: New Generation Tiga by Koichi Sakamoto
- Produced by: Tsugumi Kitaura
- Starring: Raiga Terasaka; Runa Toyoda; Shunya Kaneko; Meiku Harukawa; Tadashi Mizuno; Katsuya Takagi; Kei Hosogai; Kohshu Hirano; Akinori Ando; Yūichi Nakamura; Shin Takuma
- Cinematography: Satoshi Murakawa
- Edited by: Yosuke Yafune
- Music by: Go Sakabe
- Production company: Tsuburaya Productions
- Distributed by: Bandai Namco Arts; Tsuburaya Productions
- Release date: 18 March 2022
- Running time: 74 mins
- Country: Japan
- Language: Japanese

Ultraman Trigger: Episode Z (ウルトラマントリガー エピソードZ) is a 2022 Japanese superhero kaiju film, serving as the ending to the 2021–22 Ultra Series anime Ultraman Trigger: New Generation Tiga. Aside from its premiere on 18 March 2022 through Japanese theaters, it was also made available on the pay per view website Tsuburaya Imagination.

== Plot ==
Two years after Kengo merged into the Eternity Core as Ultraman Trigger to stabilize it, GUTS-Select and their new leader Ryuichi Tokioka deal with a new wave of Kaiju attacks before being assigned to investigate the Leyrah cult, a terrorist group seeking to restore the Ultra Ancient Civilization. The group learns from the cult's captured leader, Leyrah Ibra, relays his message of the Eternity Core and Kengo's impending doom to Yuna. Wanting to save them both require the help of Yuzare and the Ancient Sparklence, GUTS-Select agrees with the temporary alliance to enact a ritual to extract Kengo from the Eternity Core, with Kengo's Hyper Keys scattered in the process. Following a brief celebration, Ibra escapes while using a Pagos to attack TPU headquarters as a diversion. The Kaiju is quickly defeated by Ultraman Z, revealing he and Haruki were on the tracking down the alien parasite Celebro after he escaped from STORAGE's captivity. As Haruki and Z's search led them to Kengo's Earth, the group deduce that Celebro is hiding amongst the Leyrah cultists and decide to track the cult down while locating Trigger's Hyper Keys.

During their hunt for the keys, Celebro and Ibra summons a Gazort before luring Haruki away after he gives Kengo the Multi Type key for Kengo, Trigger regaining the Sky Type and Power Type keys while joined by Z to destroy Deathdrago and Genegarg in a wrestling match. However, Haruki is revealed to have been possessed by Celebro, who reveals himself while turning Ultraman Z into Z Red Damage before seemingly killing off Tokioka while stealing the Hyper Keys. Ignis arrives at that moment to spirit GUTS-Select away from the cult. The group reassembles and confront Leyrah cultists as they prepare another ritual with their true leader revealed to be Tokioka, who reveals himself as Yuzare's comrade Zabil. Zabil explains that he realized from witnessing Yuzare's death that humans must become "light" to protect themselves, having orchestrated events in anticipation of the Giants of Darkness' return to steal Trigger's light while forming an alliance with Celebro by promising the parasite that it would resume its Civilization Self-Destruction Game. With Trigger's Hyper Keys as conduits, Zabil sacrifices his followers to activate his Ancient Sparklence and transform into Evil Trigger, who proceeds to overpower Trigger Dark and GUTS-Select's mechas with Z Red Damage.

After Akito reclaims his gear to become Trigger again while Tatsumi resumes command of GUTS-Select, Kengo helps Haruki expel Celebro with Z back to normal. Celebros retaliates by possessing Ibra and turning his host into Destrudos, helping Evil Trigger overpower the Ultramen. As GUTS-Select defend Kengo as their friend when Evil Trigger mocks him for not being a human, Yuna sacrifices Yuzare's ring and the gateway tower to have the Eternity Core restore Trigger's ability to become Glitter Trigger Eternity. After Destrudos is defeated by the Ultramen, Evil Trigger attempts to kill them after using his inner darkness to increase his size. But he is fatally wounded, reverting to Zabil as he dissolves with the gateway tower. Himari gives the recaptured Celebro to Haruki, who returns to his Earth while Ignis resumes his journey for treasure. The entire GUTS-Select later celebrates their victory, while Kengo decides to continue living as both human and Ultraman.

The film ends with a post-credit scene that reveals the new Ultraman, Decker.

== Production ==
Ultraman Trigger: Episode Z was first announced by Tsuburaya Productions in the second Tsubucon stage announcement on 13 December 2021. The stage greeting presents the actors Raiga Terasaka, Kohshu Hirano, and Yūichi Nakamura introducing themselves to the audience with Evil Trigger making his brief glimpse of appearance. Kohshu Hirano noted that since the series Ultraman Z lacks a film adaptation, he hoped to leave his mark for the franchise through his guest appearance. Actor Yūichi Nakamura acknowledges that the voice actor who shares his name was the voice of the eponymous Ultraman X and added that he was "mistakenly" picked by the series for this role.

=== Releases ===
Apart from the film's availability in Japanese theaters, it is also available for viewing in Tsuburaya Imagination, a pay per view subscription service exclusively in Japan, hence its label as a "Tsuburaya Imagination original film". Tsuburaya's English website later announces the movie's availability in certain countries outside Japan as a video on demand through Ultraman Connection website, followed by a talk show between the cast members, Raiga Terasaka, Runa Toyoda, Shunya Kaneko and Kohshu Hirano. The subtitles provided are English, Thai, Indonesian, Malay, Brazilian Portuguese, Latin American Spanish, Vietnamese, Tagalog, and Korean.

== Cast ==
Kengo Manaka (マナカ ケンゴ, Manaka Kengo)/Ultraman Trigger (ウルトラマントリガー, Urutoraman Torigā)
Voiced by: Raiga Terasaka
Yuna Shizuma (シズマ ユナ, Shizuma Yuna)
Voiced by: Runa Toyoda
Akito Hijiri (ヒジリ アキト, Hijiri Akito)
Voiced by: Shunya Kaneko
Himari Nanase (ナナセ ヒマリ, Nanase Himari)
Voiced by: Meiku Harukawa
Tesshin Sakuma (サクマ テッシン, Sakuma Tesshin)
Voiced by: Tadashi Mizuno
Seiya Tatsumi (タツミ セイヤ, Tatsumi Seiya)
Voiced by: Katsuya Takagi
Ignis (イグニス, Igunisu)/Trigger Dark (トリガーダーク, Torigā Dāku; Voice)
Voiced by: Kei Hosogai
Haruki Natsukawa (ナツカワ ハルキ, Natsukawa Haruki)
Voiced by: Kohshu Hirano
Rylar Ibra (ライラー イブラ, Rairā Ibura)
Voiced by: Akinori Ando
Ryuichi Tokioka (トキオカ リュウイチ, Tokioka Ryūichi)/Evil Trigger (イーヴィルトリガー, Īviru Torigā)
Voiced by: Yūichi Nakamura
Mitsukuni Shizuma (シズマ ミツクニ, Shizuma Mitsukuni)
Voiced by: Shin Takuma (Japanese); 宅麻 伸 (English)
Marluru (マルゥル, Marwuru)
Voiced by: Mao Ichimichi
Ultraman Z (ウルトラマンゼット, Urutoraman Zetto)
Voiced by: Tasuku Hatanaka
Beliarok (ベリアロク, Beriaroku)
Voiced by: Yūki Ono

== Theme songs ==
"Believer"

- Lyrics: Sayuri Horishita
- Composition: Kōsuke Morimoto
- Arrangement: Tōru Watanabe and Hirofumi Hibino
- Vocals: Kengo Manaka (Raiga Terasaka), Yuna Shizuma (Runa Toyoda), and Akito Hijiri (Shunya Kaneko)
