= Tasuku Hatanaka =

Japanese actor, voice actor and singer

- 畠中 祐
- Born: August 17, 1994 (age 32); Sagamihara, Kanagawa, Japan
- Education: J. F. Oberlin University
- Occupations: Actor; voice actor; singer
- Years active: 2006–present
- Agent: Ken Production
- Spouse: Sayaka Senbongi (m. 2019)
- Parents: Hiroshi Hatanaka (father); Keiko Fukushima (mother)

Tasuku Hatanaka (畠中 祐, Hatanaka Tasuku) is a Japanese actor, voice actor and singer.

== Early life ==
Hatanaka is the son of actors Hiroshi Hatanaka and Keiko Fukushima. His mother was also a choreographer, and taught him to dance. He wanted to be an actor like his parents as a boy. He was overweight as a kid, and his parents recommend him to target himself as a overweight actor if he wanted to pursue the career, which he did not. In High School, he was on the basketball team and as a cheerleader. He attended J. F. Oberlin University, studying psychology and sociology.

== Career ==
When Hatanaka was 16, he voiced Yuma Tsukumo and did the whistling for Kaito Tenjo in the anime series Yu-Gi-Oh! Zexal. He continued voice acting, appearing as Ushio in Ushio and Tora, Ikoma in Kabaneri of the Iron Fortress, Gō Nagakura in Battery, and Fudō Nomura in Armed Girl's Machiavellism. He was listed among the Best Voice Actors for Newtype Anime Awards in 2016.

He is also the official Japanese voice-dubbing artist for Skandar Keynes as Edmund Pevensie in The Chronicles of Narnia, which was his debut role as a voice actor. Since 2013, Hatanaka has been employed by Ken Production.

His music career includes "Dying Wish", the opening theme for Moriarty the Patriot, and "Twisted Hearts", the opening theme for the anime's second season. In addition to his solo musical career, Tasuku is also a member of Animate Channel's group 8P.

On December 29, 2019, the agency I'm Enterprise announced in a statement that Hatanaka and Sayaka Senbongi had married.

== Filmography ==
=== Anime ===
List of voice performances in anime
Year	Title	Role	Notes	Source
2011–14	Yu-Gi-Oh! Zexal series	Yuma Tsukumo, Kaito Tenjo (whistling)	2 seasons	
2014	Ping Pong the Animation	Additional voices		
2014	Bakumatsu Rock	Justice Corps		
2015	Kuroko's Basketball	Reiji Mochida	Season 3	
2015	Gunslinger Stratos	Student		
2015–16	Ushio and Tora	Ushio Aotsuki	2 seasons	
2015	Snow White with the Red Hair	Soldier		
2016	Hikari: Kariya wo Tsunagu Monogatari	Sano	Other	
2016–25	My Hero Academia	Denki Kaminari		
2016	Kabaneri of the Iron Fortress	Ikoma		
2016	Cheer Boys!!	Mori Hisashi		
2016	Battery: The Animation	Kō Nagakura		
2016	JoJo's Bizarre Adventure: Diamond Is Unbreakable	Satoru Nakae	Ep. 108	
2017	Armed Girl's Machiavellism	Fudou Nomura	Also OVA	
2017	Nana Maru San Batsu	Daisuke Inoue		
2018	Basilisk: The Ōka Ninja Scrolls	Kouga Hachirou		
2018	The Legend of the Galactic Heroes: Die Neue These – Kaikō	Lao		
2018	Attack on Titan	Flegel Reeves	Season 3	
2018	Captain Tsubasa	Yūzō Morisaki		
2018	My Sister, My Writer	Yū Nagami		
2019	Domestic Girlfriend	Alex J. Matsukawa		
2019	Mob Psycho 100 II	Joseph		
2019	Ace of Diamond Act II	Hirofumi Asada		
2019	Senryu Girl	Eiji Busujima		
2019	King of Prism: Shiny Seven Stars	Taiga Kōgami		
2019	The Ones Within	Anya Kudō		
2019	Stars Align	Tōma Shinjō		
2020	Golden Kamuy Season 3	Yuusaku Hanazawa		
2021	Project Scard: Scar on the Praeter	Itsuki Torataka		
2021	SK8 the Infinity	Reki Kyan		
2021	Those Snow White Notes	Sōichi Tanuma		
2021	Mars Red	Shutaro Kurusu		
2021	Re-Main	Yutaka Babayaro Inomata		
2022	Tokyo Revengers	Hakkai Shiba		
2022	Mobile Suit Gundam: The Witch from Mercury	Nuno Kargan		
2022	I'm the Villainess, So I'm Taming the Final Boss	Auguste Zelm		
2022	Lupin Zero	Arsène Lupin III		
2023	Sacrificial Princess and the King of Beasts	Lanteveldt		
2023	Overtake!	Kotarō Komaki		
2023	MF Ghost	Ogata		
2023	A Playthrough of a Certain Dude's VRMMO Life	Zwei		
2023	Paradox Live the Animation	Satsuki Itō		
2023	Under Ninja	Miracle Hibi		
2023	The Vexations of a Shut-In Vampire Princess	Melakonsi		
2023	Ragna Crimson	Shin Cutlass		
2024	A Sign of Affection	Shin Iryuu		
2024	Pokémon Horizons: The Series	Jinia		
2024	Shinkalion: Change the World	Tsukumo Umikaze		
2024	The Most Notorious "Talker" Runs the World's Greatest Clan	Loki		
2025	Beheneko: The Elf-Girl's Cat Is Secretly an S-Ranked Monster!	Tama		
2025	Medaka Kuroiwa Is Impervious to My Charms	Yuzuru Kido		
2025	Everyday Host	Ryōichi		
2025	April Showers Bring May Flowers	Tsutomu Shinbashi		
2025	Let's Play	Umed Patel		
2026	Hell Mode	Dogora		
2026	Tamon's B-Side	Keito Tachibana		
2026	Let's Go Kaikigumi	Protagonist		
2026	The Prince of Tennis II: U-17 World Cup Finals Members Decisive Match	Julio Roman		
2026	A Tale of the Secret Saint	Desmond Ronan		
2027	The Guy She Was Interested in Wasn't a Guy at All	Megumu Narita		

=== Film ===
List of voice performances in film
Year	Title	Role	Notes	Source
2016	King of Prism by Pretty Rhythm	Taiga Kōgami		
2017	King of Prism: Pride the Hero	Taiga Kōgami		
2018	Mirai	Kun (High Schooler)		
2018	My Hero Academia: Two Heroes	Denki Kaminari		
2019	King of Prism: Shiny Seven Stars	Taiga Kōgami		
2019	Kabaneri of the Iron Fortress: Unato Decisive Battle	Ikoma	Sequel to Kabaneri of the Iron Fortress	
2019	My Hero Academia: Heroes Rising	Denki Kaminari		
2022	Bubble	Denki Ninja		
2022	The Tunnel to Summer, the Exit of Goodbyes	Shōhei Kaga		
2023	Maboroshi	Atsushi Nitta		

=== Video games ===
List of voice performances in video games
Year	Title	Role	Notes	Source
2000	Project Justice	Kyosuke	Naomi/Dreamcast	
2017	God Wars: Future Past	Quintaro		
2018	A3!	Kumon Hyodo	iOS/Android	
2018	My Hero Academia: One's Justice	Denki Kaminari		
2018	Captain Tsubasa Zero: Miracle Shoot	Yūzō Morisaki	iOS/Android	
2018	Digimon ReArise	Elecmon	iOS/Android	
2018	Mega Man 11	Blast Man		
2019	Another Eden	Breeno	iOS/Android	
2020	Captain Tsubasa: Rise of New Champions	Yūzō Morisaki	PlayStation 4/Nintendo Switch/Windows	
2020	Kingdom Hearts III Re Mind	Yozora		
2020	Final Fantasy VII Remake	Leslie Kyle		
2021	Paradigm Paradox	Yukinami		
2021	Genshin Impact	Gorou		
2022	Valkyrie Connect	Minurval		
2022	Shadowverse	Taketsumi the Aconite Paladin		
2022	Fire Emblem Warriors: Three Hopes	Shez		
2024	18TRIP	Kaede Hamasaki	iOS/Android	
2026	Echoes of Aincrad	Wyzeman	PlayStation 5/Xbox Series X/S/Windows	

=== Tokusatsu ===
List of voice performances in tokusatsu series
Year	Title	Role	Notes	Sources
2020	Ultraman Z	Ultraman Z		
2020	Ultra Galaxy Fight: The Absolute Conspiracy	Ultraman Z		
2021	Ultraman Trigger	Ultraman Z	Episode 7,8	
2022	Ultraman Trigger: Episode Z	Ultraman Z		
2022	Ultra Galaxy Fight: The Destined Crossroad	Ultraman Z		
2023	Ultraman New Generation Stars	Ultraman Z	Seasons 1, 3, 4	

=== Drama CDs ===
Audio drama performances
Year	Title	Role	Notes	Sources
2017	Kashikomarimashita, Destiny side:Master	Jiro Saionji		
2018	Kashikomarimashita, Destiny -Answer-	Jiro Saionji		
2018	Koi to Sei to Mahou no Sayou	Kazuya Yushima		
2018	GANGxROCK	Madono Guren		
2020	Paradox Live	Satsuki Ito		
2020	My Stepmom's Daughter Is My Ex	Kawanami Kogure		
2020	Paradigm Paradox	Yukinami		
2024	The Guy She Was Interested in Wasn't a Guy at All	Megumu Narita		

=== Dubbing roles ===
List of voice performances in overseas and other dubs
Year	Title	Role	Voice dub for	Notes	Source
2005–10	The Chronicles of Narnia	Edmund Pevensie	Skandar Keynes		
2006	The Wild	Ryan		Animation	
2007	Meet the Robinsons	Stanley		Animation	
2012	Shameless	Mickey Milkovich	Noel Fisher		
2013	Monsters University	Teen male voice		Animation	
2014	Pac-Man and the Ghostly Adventures	Fire Ghost		Animation	
2014	Boyhood	Mason Evans Jr. (Older)	Ellar Coltrane		
2014	The Maze Runner	Thomas	Dylan O'Brien		
2014	Teenage Mutant Ninja Turtles	Michelangelo	Noel Fisher		
2015	Maze Runner: The Scorch Trials	Thomas	Dylan O'Brien		
2016	Teenage Mutant Ninja Turtles: Out of the Shadows	Michelangelo	Noel Fisher		
2017	Sing	Cat Youth		Animation	
2017	Spider-Man: Homecoming	Flash Thompson	Tony Revolori		
2018	Grey's Anatomy	Dr. Levi Schmitt	Jake Borelli		
2018	Pacific Rim Uprising	Ou-Yang Jinhai	Wesley Wong		
2018	School of Rock	Zack	Lance Lim		
2018	Maze Runner: The Death Cure	Thomas	Dylan O'Brien		
2019	Spider-Man: Far From Home	Flash Thompson	Tony Revolori		
2020	Mulan	Ling	Jimmy Wong		
2021	Encanto	Camilo Madrigal	Rhenzy Feliz	Animation	
2021	Arcane	Ekko	Reed Shannon	Animation	
2021	And Just Like That...	Brady Hobbes	Niall Cunningham		
2022	Spider-Man: No Way Home	Flash Thompson	Tony Revolori		
2022	Dear Evan Hansen	Evan Hansen	Ben Platt		
2022	St. Elmo's Fire	Kevin Dolenz	Andrew McCarthy	The Cinema edition	
2022	Avatar: The Way of Water	Neteyam	Jamie Flatters		
2023	The Super Mario Bros. Movie	Luigi	Charlie Day	Animation	
2023	Gran Turismo	Persol	Nikhil Parmar		
2024	Alien: Romulus	Bjorn	Spike Fearn		
2025	Wednesday	Isaac Night/Slurp	Owen Painter		
2025	The Fast and the Furious: Tokyo Drift	Morimoto	Leonardo Nam	The Cinema edition	
2026	The Super Mario Galaxy Movie	Luigi	Charlie Day	Animation	
