= Yūki Ono =

Japanese voice actor and singer (born 1984)

- 小野 友樹
- Born: June 22, 1984 (age 42); Shizuoka, Shizuoka, Japan
- Education: Waseda University
- Occupations: Voice actor; singer
- Years active: 2006–present
- Notable work: Beastars as Louis; Gintama as Shige Shige Tokugawa
- Children: 1
- Website: web.onoyuki.com

Yūki Ono (小野 友樹, Ono Yūki; born June 22, 1984) is a Japanese voice actor and singer. He was represented by Atomic Monkey and is now a freelancer. His major roles are Josuke Higashikata in JoJo's Bizarre Adventure: Diamond Is Unbreakable, Taiga Kagami in Kuroko's Basketball, Zenkichi Hitoyoshi in Medaka Box, Kaname Tsukahara in Kimi to Boku, Masayuki Hori in Monthly Girls' Nozaki-kun, Jun Isashiki in Ace of Diamond and Ultraman Belial in the recurring Ultraman Series.

== Biography ==
During his high school years, Ono aimed to become a professional soccer player and at one point was scouted by the Shimizu S-Pulse. He stopped playing in the third year, due to bone fracture.

During his years in university, Ono became a fan of Kishō Taniyama. In addition to meeting the voice actor in person at an anime event, this inspired him to pursue the same career.

In August 2011, Ono formed the voice acting unit You-Tak (ゆーたく, Yū-Taku) alongside Takuya Eguchi. The two had also worked on various Drama CD productions and events. In January 2013, it was renamed to You-Tak II (ゆーたくII, Yū-Taku Tsū).

In March 2013, he was awarded for "best actors in supporting role" in the 7th Seiyu Awards.

On October 2, 2017, Ono announced his marriage from the last seven years prior in his blog post. His wife is a person working outside the entertainment industry. In August 2020, Ono announced the birth of his first child.

Ono revealed on NHK that his father is also an NHK announcer and hence, under his father's influence, he wanted to try to take more narration works in the future.

== Filmography ==
=== Anime ===
List of voice performances in anime
Year	Title	Role	Notes	Source
	Soreike! Anpanman	Kuma no Oka くまのおじさん		
	Sgt. Frog	Alien 宇宙人		
2006–15	Gin Tama	Shige Shige Tokugawa, others		
2006	The Good Witch of the West	Soldier		
2006	Yume Tsukai	Station attendant		
2007	Saint October	Joshua		
2007	Koi suru Tenshi Angelique ~ Kagayaki no Ashita ~	Researcher, Member		
2007	Saint Beast	Demon, Angel		
2007	Toward the Terra	Dr. Noll D		
2007	Mushi-Uta	Student		
2007–08	Da Capo II	Various characters	2 seasons	
2007	Myself; Yourself	Student council president		
2008	Yu-Gi-Oh 5D's	Kyosuke Kiryu (Kalin Kessler)		
2008	Itazura na Kiss	Watanabe		
2008	Hell Girl	Colleague	season 3	
2008	Kannagi	Male student		
2009-11	Kimi ni Todoke	Kazuichi "Pin" Arai	2 seasons	
2009	Fairy Tail	Jason		
2010	Maid Sama!	Eita Yoshino, Shousei Nikaidou		
2010	SD Gundam Sangokuden Brave Battle Warriors	Chou-un Gundam (Zhao Yun)		
2010	Duel Masters Cross Shock	Creature		
2010	Battle Spirits: Brave	Subordinate		
2010	Super Robot Wars Original Generation: The Inspector	Various characters		
2010	And Yet the Town Moves	Ayumu Arashiyama		
2010	Princess Jellyfish	Inari's subordinate		
2011–15	Dog Days series	Emilio Alcide, Jean Casoni, others		
2011	Steins;Gate	Viral attackers		
2011	Sket Dance	Misato		
2011	Sekai-ichi Hatsukoi	Guest		
2011	Hen Semi	Mr. A's clothing 女装A氏		
2011	It was truly there! Mr. Shinkin media	Professor Kohei, Mutsuki Obuchi, Musume Rusu 教頭先生/鰐淵/露美男		
2011	Inazuma Eleven Go	Kishibe Taiga 貴志部大河		
2011	Nura: Rise of the Yokai Clan – Demon Capital	Kyo Yokai, Boys 京妖怪/男子		
2011	Baka and Test	Shunpei Natsukawa		
2011	Blood-C	Shinichirō Tokizane		
2011	The Mystic Archives of Dantalian	Soldier		
2011	Hunter × Hunter	Seaman A		
2011–12	Kimi to Boku	Kaname Tsukahara	2 seasons	
2011	High Score	Rieji Fujiwara		
2012	Daily Lives of High School Boys	Toshiyuki Karasawa		
2012	Inu x Boku SS	Boy 1		
2012	Zetman	Fire Player		
2012	Medaka Box	Zenkichi Hitoyoshi	2 seasons	
2012–17	Kuroko's Basketball	Taiga Kagami	3 seasons and Last Game	
2012	Hyoka	A cappella member		
2012	Muv-Luv Alternative: Total Eclipse	Imperial Force A, Colleague		
2012	Tari Tari	Tōru Hamada		
2012	Good Luck Girl!	Urashimanoko Mizunoe		
2012	Kokoro Connect	Shingo Watase		
2012	Battle Spirits: Sword Eyes	Sora Ryouyu ソラ・リュウヨウ		
2012	My Little Monster	Tomio, Nagoya		
2012	The Pet Girl of Sakurasou	Senior, teacher		
2013	Da Capo III	Kiyotaka Yoshino		
2013	Beast Saga	Head お頭		
2013	The Devil Is a Part-Timer!	Shirō Ashiya / Alciel		
2013	Devil Survivor 2: The Animation	Berserker		
2013	Muromi-san	Fish Dinosaur		
2013	Gargantia on the Verdurous Planet	Kugel		
2013	Arata: The Legend	Kannagi		
2013	Valvrave the Liberator	Kyūma Inuzuka	2 seasons	
2013	Makai Ouji: Devils and Realist	Mycroft Swallow		
2013–14	Silver Spoon	Shinichirō Inada	2 seasons	
2013	Strike the Blood	Dimitrie Vatler		
2013–16	Ace of Diamond	Jun Isashiki	2 seasons	
2013	Yozakura Quartet ~Hana no Uta~	Eiji Shinozuka	replaces Hideki Tasaka	
2013	Unbreakable Machine-Doll	Magnus		
2013	Gingitsune	Taisuke Kinugawa		
2014	Noragami	Urasawa		
2014	Hamatora	Moral		
2014	Nanana's Buried Treasure	Jūgo Yama		
2014	Monthly Girls' Nozaki-kun	Masayuki Hori		
2015–16	Durarara!!x2	Chikage Rokujo	3 cours	
2015	Rolling Girls	Rick		
2015	Maria the Virgin Witch	Garfa		
2015–16	Food Wars: Shokugeki no Soma	Isami Aldini	2 seasons	
2015	Rin-ne	Haunted house spirit		
2015–16	The Heroic Legend of Arslan	Jaswant	2 seasons	
2015	Yamada and the Seven Witches	Mitsuru Kameda		
2016	Prince of Stride: Alternative	Asuma Mayuzumi		
2016	Kono Danshi, Mahou ga Oshigoto Desu.	Chiharu Kamishima 神島千晴		
2016-2017	JoJo's Bizarre Adventure: Diamond Is Unbreakable	Josuke Higashikata	1 season	
2016	Terra Formars: Revenge	Bao Zhilan		
2016	Twin Star Exorcists	Kamui		
2016	Servamp	Tetsu Sendagaya		
2016	Cheer Boys!!	Shō Tokugawa		
2016	Ozmafia!!	Hameln		
2016	Battery	Shūgo Kadowaki		
2016	Magic-kyun! Renaissance	Rintarō Tatewaki		
2016	Kiss Him, Not Me	Yūsuke Igarashi		
2017	Descending Stories: Showa Genroku Rakugo Shinju	Shinnosuke		
2017–19	Granblue Fantasy The Animation	Gran	2 seasons	
2017	Magical Circle Guru Guru	Tatejiwa Nezumi (A～F), Tatejiwa Nezumi	Ep. 2–3, 5–6	
2017	Tsukipro The Animation	Morihito Arihara		
2018	Touken Ranbu: Hanamaru 2	Ōkane Hira		
2018	The Thousand Musketeers	Ali Pasha		
2018	Angolmois: Record of Mongol Invasion	Kuchii Jinzaburō		
2018	Phantom in the Twilight	Chris		
2018	Yuuna and the Haunted Hot Springs	Kogarashi Fuyuzora		
2018	Boarding School Juliet	Romio Inuzuka		
2018	Dakaichi	Junta Azumaya		
2018	Conception	Itsuki Yuge		
2019	Ensemble Stars!	Koga Oogami		
2019	Actors: Songs Connection	Mike Enjōji		
2019–21	Beastars	Louis		
2019	Assassins Pride	Kufa Vampir		
2020	Keep Your Hands Off Eizouken!	Robot Club Ono		
2020	Pet	Satoru		
2020	Show by Rock!! Mashumairesh!!	Joe		
2020	Somali and the Forest Spirit	Haitora		
2020	The Titan's Bride	Caius Lao Bistail		
2020	Mr Love: Queen's Choice	Haku (Gavin)		
2020	Moriarty the Patriot	John H. Watson		
2020	Magatsu Wahrheit -Zuerst-	Reokadio		
2020	Fire Force Season 2	Takagi Oze		
2020	Yo-kai Watch Jam – Yo-kai Academy Y: Close Encounters of the N Kind	Bakera, Kengo Benimaru		
2021	So I'm a Spider, So What?	Yagi Yomoshita		
2021	I-Chu: Halfway Through the Idol	Tsubaki Rindo		
2021	Show by Rock!! Stars!!	Joe		
2021	Skate-Leading Stars	Taiga Himuro		
2021	Cosmo Samurai	TOM	Toonami non-canonical TIE	
2022	Sasaki and Miyano	Jirō Ogasawara		
2022	Salaryman's Club	Daiki Oginome		
2022	Mahjong Soul Pong	Wanjirō		
2022	Aoashi	Chiaki Mutō		
2022	Shoot! Goal to the Future	Jō Kazama		
2022	Cardfight!! Vanguard will+Dress	Danji Momoyama		
2022	The Devil Is a Part-Timer!!	Shirō Ashiya / Alciel		
2022	Bleach: Thousand-Year Blood War	Bazz-B		
2022	Blue Lock	Rensuke Kunigami		
2022	I'm the Villainess, So I'm Taming the Final Boss	Beelzebuth		
2023	The Tale of the Outcasts	Luther		
2023	The Legend of Heroes: Trails of Cold Steel – Northern War	Talion Drake		
2023	Captain Tsubasa: Junior Youth Arc	Louis Napoleon		
2024	The Demon Prince of Momochi House	Ise		
2024	Mashle: The Divine Visionary Candidate Exam Arc	Orter Mádl		
2024	The Magical Girl and the Evil Lieutenant Used to Be Archenemies	Mira		
2024	Go! Go! Loser Ranger!	Kai Shion		
2024	Blue Box	Shōta Hyōdō		
2025	Headhunted to Another World: From Salaryman to Big Four!	Dennosuke Uchimura		
2025	Captivated, by You	Yūichi Medaka		
2025	Clevatess	Mirlo		
2025	A Star Brighter Than the Sun	Kōki Kamishiro		
2025	Tougen Anki	Osuke Momokado		
2026	The Other World's Books Depend on the Bean Counter	Siegvold		
2026	Hell Teacher: Jigoku Sensei Nube	Kirato Imi		
2026	Fate/strange Fake	Saber		
2026	The Forsaken Saintess and Her Foodie Roadtrip in Another World	Ville		

=== Original video animation (OVA) ===
List of voice performances in original video animation
Year	Title	Role	Notes	Source
2014	Hybrid Child	Kuroda		
2015	Yankee-kun na Yamada-kun to Megane-chan to Majo	Daichi Shinagawa		
2018	Yarichin Bitch Club	Yui Tamura		
2024	Code Geass: Rozé of the Recapture	Gran		

=== Original net animation (ONA) ===
List of voice performances in original net animation
Year	Title	Role	Notes	Source
2012	Jigoku Youchien	Kiichi-kun		
2021	Gundam Breaker Battlogue	Tо̄ma Aizen		
2024	Kimi ni Todoke 3rd Season	Kazuichi "Pin" Arai		
2026	Dandelion	Shinji Kyōkawa		

=== Film ===
List of voice performances in film
Year	Title	Role	Notes	Source
2012	Blood-C: The Last Dark	Helicopter pilot		
2013	Ryo	Hanjirō Nakamura	short film	
2013	Dragon Force	Homura Feret (Fire Dragon)		
2017	Kuroko's Basketball The Movie: Last Game	Taiga Kagami		
2018	Servamp -Alice in the Garden-	Tetsu Sendagaya		
2019	Yo-kai Watch Jam the Movie: Yo-Kai Academy Y – Can a Cat be a Hero?	Bakera, Kengo Benimaru		
2020	Saezuru Tori wa Habatakanai – The Clouds Gather	Akira Kuga		
2021	Dakaichi: Spain Arc	Junta Azumaya		
2023	Sasaki and Miyano: Graduation	Jirō Ogasawara		
2023	Fate/strange Fake: Whispers of Dawn	Saber		
2024	Blue Lock: Episode Nagi	Rensuke Kunigami		
2024	My Hero Academia: You're Next	Kamil Gorrini		
2025	Dive in Wonderland	Mallymkun		

=== Tokusatsu ===
List of voice performances in tokusatsu
Year	Title	Role	Notes	Source
2008–12	Kankyou Choujin Ecogainder	Ecogainder	Also in II and OX.	
2012	Tokumei Sentai Go-Busters	Parabolaloid 2	Ep. 40	
2013–14	Ultraman Retsuden	Ultraman Belial	Also in Shin Ultraman Retsuden.	
2013	Ultra Zero Fight	Ultraman Belial/Kaiser Darkness/Zero Darkness		
2014	Ultraman Ginga S	Alien Zetton Berume〈SD〉	Ep. 14, 16	
2015	Ultraman X	Alien Zetton	Ep. 9	
2017–18	Uchu Sentai Kyuranger	Balance/Tenbin Gold		
2017	Kamen Rider × Super Sentai: Ultra Super Hero Taisen	Balance/Tenbin Gold	Movie	
2017	Ultraman Geed	Ultraman Belial		
2017	Uchu Sentai Kyuranger the Movie: Gase Indaver Strikes Back	Balance/Tenbin Gold	Movie	
2020	Ultraman Z	Beliarok		
2021	Ultraman Trigger: New Generation Tiga	Beliarok	Episode 7	
2022	Ultraman Trigger: Episode Z	Beliarok	Movie	
2022	Ultra Galaxy Fight: The Destined Crossroad	Beliarok		
2025	Ultraman New Generation Stars	Beliarok		

=== Video games ===
List of voice performances in video games
Year	Title	Role	Notes	Source
2007	The Promise of Haruhi Suzumiya	Computer lab member	PSP	
2009	Akai Ito Destiny DS	Tomoki	DS	
2009–11	Yu-Gi-Oh 5D's games	Kyosuke Kiryu	PSP	
2009–13	Starry Sky games	Shogo Kuchi		
2010	Absolute Labyrinth Grim Seven ~girls in a paradise with seven keys~	Goa	PSP	
2011	Gakuen Tokkyuu Hotokenser	Ryo Kurosaki, Carl	PC	
2011	Miss Princess Miss Pri!	Tutorial for Kowloons 九龍院要	DS	
2012	Hitofuta Kitan	Palace Toa 坎宮トア	PC	
2012	Conception: Ore no Kodomo o Undekure!	Itsuki Yuge	Main player character, PSP	
2012–15	Kuroko's Basketball games	Taiga Kagami	PSP	
2012	Mobile Suit Gundam AGE	Jonathan Gustav	Universe Axel and Cosmic Drive; PSP	
2012	Kokoro Connect	Shingo Watase	PSP	
2013	English Detective Mysteria	Porrock	PSP	
2013	Princess Arthur	Lancelot	PSP	
2013	Summon Night 5	Caris カリス	PSP	
2013	Storm Lover 2nd	Luke · Fernando · Javier 陸・フェルナンド・ハビエル	PSP, also V	
2013	Romeo VS Juliet	William Shakespeare	PSP	
2013	Seishun Hajimemashita!	Omoto Sanmono 山王堂王子	PSP	
2013	Fairy Fencer F	Souji	PS3	
2013	Exstetra	Jin	DS, PS Vita	
2013	Arcana Famiglia 2	Serafino	PSP	
2013	Snow Bound Land	Aje	PSP	
2014	Minus Eight	Utano Association 宇多野准	PSP	
2014	Sneak into Love	Yuri Kaiseki 由利鎌清	PSP	
2014	Of the Red, the Light, and the Ayakashi	Pure 眞白	PSP	
2014	Satomi Hakkenden Hajimechi	Inuyama Naga 犬村大角	PSP, also Hamaji Himeyuki	
2014	Romeo & Juliet	William Shakespeare	PSP; Also Volume pack in 2015	
2014	Shinrabanshi ~Tenchi Mimi no Chapter~	Maxius マキシウス		
2014	Dance of the Battlefield	Elias エリアス		
2015	Kaleid Eve	Karu Igarashi 五十嵐馨	PSP, other	
2015	Momoka Yukka	Ryuji Rokkai 六合龍二		
2015	Ozmafia Vivace	Hameln		
2015	Sword is for you V	Ninety-nine 九十九丸		
2015	Poems of Velpurga	Tiger (Ogami Tiger Maru) トラ（大神虎丸）	PC, PS3	
2015	Possession Magenta	Su 蘇明杰		
2015	Five Love Prince ~Secret Marriage of Secret~	Masaru Igarashi 五十嵐将		
2015	Shinobi, Koi Utsutsu	Yuri Kamakiyo		
2015	Prince of Stride	Asuma Mayuzumi		
2015	Absolute Labyrinth Secret Grand Princess	Lune リューン		
2015	Arslan: The Warriors of Legend	Jaswant	PS3, other	
2015	Tokyo Mirage Sessions ♯FE	Touma Akagi		
2016	British Detective Mysteria The Crown	Moriarty Jr.		
2016	Meiken 2	Yakumo 八雲	PS3, other	
2016	Collar × Malice	Saeki Yuzuru 冴木弓弦		
2016	Evil a Crime ~a thousand curse, a thousand prayers~	Mamoru Uekie 上樹守人	PC	
2016	Magic-kyun Renaissance	Rintarō Tatewaki		
2016	Ken ga Kimi	Tsuzuramaru 九十九丸		
2017	Digimon Story: Cyber Sleuth – Hacker's Memory	Chitose Imai	PS4, PS Vita	
2019	Mr Love: Queen's Choice	Gavin / Baiqi / Haku	iOS, Android	
2019	The King of Fighters for Girls	K'	Android, iOS	
2019	JoJo's Bizarre Adventure: Last Survivor	Josuke Higashikata	Arcade	
2020	Bleach: Brave Souls	Bazz-B	iOS, Android	
2020	Granblue Fantasy Versus	Gran, Lancelot	PS4, PC (Steam)	
2020	Arknights	Sesa	iOS, Android	
2021	Guardian Tales	The Guardian Knight (Male. Japanese, Chinese and Nintendo Switch servers only), The Impostor Knight (Male)	iOS, Android, Nintendo Switch	
2021	Angelique Luminarise	Cyrus/Silas	Nintendo Switch	
2021	Cookie Run: Kingdom	Eclair Cookie	Android, iOS	
2021	Slow Damage	Towa トワ	PC (Adult Only)	
2022	JoJo's Bizarre Adventure: All Star Battle R	Josuke Higashikata	PS4, PS5, Xbox One, Xbox Series X/S, Nintendo Switch, PC	
2022	Cardfight!! Vanguard Dear Days	Danji Momoyama	Nintendo Switch, PC	
2024	Wuthering Waves	Jiyan	Android, iOS, PC, PS5	
2025	Shuten Order	Yugen Ushitora		
TBA	Goblin Slayer Another Adventurer: Nightmare Feast	Squire		

=== Drama CD ===
List of voice performances in drama CD
Year	Title	Role	Notes	Source
	Dog Days	Emilio		
	Da Capo III			
2011	Sensual Phrase			
2013	Udagawachou de Matteteyo	Yashiro Tomoya		
2014	The Demon Prince of Momochi House	Ise		
2015	The Demon Prince of Momochi House Part 2	Ise		
2015	The Demon Prince of Momochi House Part 3	Ise		
2018	A Terrified Teacher at Ghoul School	Hatanaka Izuna		

=== BL CD Drama ===
- 10Dance – Suzuki Shinya
- Akihabara Fall in Love – Yuuki Hasegawa
- Don't Stay Gold – Kuga
- Hatsukoi no Atosaki – Nishima Tooru
- Iberiko Buta to Koi to Tsubaki – Yoshimune
- Saezuru Tori wa Habatakanai – Kuga
- Shinjo-kun to Sasahara-kun – Sasahara
- Hana no Mizo Shiru – Arikawa Youichi
- Yatamomo – Yata
- Renai-rubi no Tadashii Furikata – Hayashida Kannosuke
- Megumi to Tsugumi – Kokonoe Megumi

=== Radio drama ===
- Kuroko's Basketball – Taiga Kagami
- Samurai Shodown: Warriors Rage – Tohma Kuki
- A Terrified Teacher at Ghoul School – Izuna Hatanaka

=== Dubbing ===
List of voice performances in other dubbing
Year	Title	Role	Voice dub for	Notes	Source
2013	Super Evil Transformation DX Kaiser Darkness 超悪変形 DXカイザーダークネス	Kaiser Darkness		Action figure	
2016-19	Ultraman Festival Live Stage	Ultraman Belial		Stage show	
2018	Ultra Heroes EXPO 2018 Battle Stage	Ultraman Belial		Stage show	
2018	DARKNESS HEELS WORLD	Navigation system voice		Event in Tokyo Solamachi	
2018	Phantom World Demon Sword Beliarok – Deathcium Talking Ver. 幻界魔剣 ベリアロク-Deathcium Talking Ver.-	Beliarok		P-Bandai exclusive product	
2018	A Very English Scandal	Norman Scott	Ben Whishaw		
2019	Ultraman Live Precious Stage	Ultraman Belial		Stage show	
2019	Dorothy and the Wizard of Oz	Frank		Animation	
2020	Marona's Fantastic Tale	Manole		Animation	
2022	Mune: Guardian of the Moon	Sohone		Animation	
