= Battle of Demons =

Japanese media franchise

- Cover of the vol. 1 of first edition novel, first published on July 31, 2007

華鬼 (Hana Oni)
- Genre: Fantasy, romance
- Serial novel

Hana Oni
- Written by: Risa
- Illustrated by: Yone Kazuki
- Published by: East Press
- Imprint: Regalo
- Published: 2004
- Volumes: 4 (+1 side story)
- Live-action film
- Directed by: Kōtarō Terauchi
- Written by: Kōtarō Terauchi; Yoshitsugu Sagami; Takeshi Furusawa
- Music by: Akiyuki Kubota
- Studio: Tornado Film
- Licensed by: AsianCrush
- Released: November 24, 2009; November 28, 2009 (2); December 5, 2009 (3)
- Runtime: 95 mins.; 80 mins. (2); 80 mins. (3)
- Video game

Hana Oni: Koi Someru Koku Eikyū no Shirushi
- Developer: Idea Factory
- Genre: Dating simulation
- Platform: PlayStation Portable
- Released: JP: March 17, 2011
- icon

Battle of Demons (Japanese: 華鬼, Hepburn: Hana Oni; lit. "Demon of Floral Beauty") is a Japanese novel series written by Risa and illustrated by Yone Kazuki.

As of 2010, the original novel series has sold over 300,000 copies in print. It was adapted into a trilogy of live-action films in 2009, and later a stage play in 2010. It was also adapted into a video game in 2011.

== Plot ==
As male demons cannot produce offspring, they choose their mates by turning human girls into demons. One such girl, Kanna Asagiri, is taken to Kigasato High School on her 16th birthday to eventually become the bride of its most powerful demon and student council president, Kaki Kito. In order to protect Kanna, Mitsuaki Shizuma, Minaha Hayasaki, and Reiji Takatsuki assume the roles of her "guardian wings" and court her for her hand in marriage.

== Characters ==
Kanna Asagiri (朝霧 神無, Asagiri Kanna)
Portrayed by: Rina Aizawa (film), Ai Hazuki (stage play)
Kanna is a 16-year-old girl forced to relocate to Kigasato to be wedded to Kaki. Though bullied throughout her life, she has managed to survive without a guardian wing since birth. By the end of the story she has a son named Tatsuki with Kaki
Kaki Kito (木籐 華鬼, Kitō Kaki)
Portrayed by: Hirofumi Araki (film), Akihiro Hayashi (stage play); Voiced by: Tomoaki Maeno
Kaki is a 93-year-old demon with the appearance of an 18-year-old boy, and he is a student at Kigasato High School.
Reiji Takatsuki (高槻 麗二, Takatsuki Reiji)
Portrayed by: Kei Hosogai (film), Atsushi Arai, Hiroki Suzuki (stage play); Voiced by: Hirofumi Nojima
Reiji has the appearance of a 24-year-old man, and he is a nurse at Kigasato High School. His real age is unknown, though he is approximately 400 to 500 years old. He is known as the "beauty of the school infirmary" at school and is described to have beauty that surpasses gender. He serves as one of Kaki's guardian wings.
Mitsuaki Shizuma (士都麻 光晴, Shizuma Mitsuaki)
Portrayed by: Daisuke Watanabe (film), Keisuke Hasebe (stage play); Voiced by: Kazuyuki Okitsu
Mitsuaki is a 218-year-old demon with the appearance of an 18-year-old boy, and he is a student at Kigasato High School. He serves as one of Kaki's guardian wings.
Minaha Hayasaki (早咲 水羽, Hayasaki Minaha)
Portrayed by: Rakuto Tochihara (film), Shō Kubo, Shion Tsuchiya (stage play); Voiced by: Yuki Kaji
Minaha is a 34-year-old demon with the appearance of a 15-year-old boy, and he is a student at Kigasato High School. He is Kanna's classmate and serves as one of Kaki's guardian wings.
Hibiki Horikawa (堀川 響, Horikawa Hibiki)
Portrayed by: Ryota Murai (film), Ryota Ozawa (2010), Motoki Ochiai (2011) (stage play); Voiced by: Kenichi Suzumura
Hibiki is a 132-year-old demon with the appearance of a 17-year-old boy, and he is a student at Kigasato High School. He plans on killing Kaki and intends on using Kanna to manipulate him.
Kuniichi Mitsugi (貢 国一, Mitsugi Kuniichi)
Portrayed by: Riki Miura (film), Takaya Miyadera (2010), Kōsuke Kujirai (2011) (stage play); Voiced by: Kentarō Itō
Kuniichi is a 221-year-old demon with the appearance of an 18-year-old boy, and he is a student at Kigasato High School. He is one of Kaki's former guardian wings.
Moegi Sahara (佐原 もえぎ, Sahara Moegi)
Portrayed by: Yukie Kawamura (film); Voiced by: Saya Shinomiya
Moegi is Reiji's current bride, and they have been married for the past 20 years with no children. She is caring and supportive towards Kanna. In the video game adaptation, she is the bride of Reiji's son, and she has a father-daughter relationship with Reiji instead.

Momoko Tosazuka (土佐塚 桃子, Tosazuka Momoko)
Portrayed by: Ai Kago (film), Haruna Mitamura (stage play); Voiced by: Jun Miruno
Momoko is Kanna's classmate and only friend. She was also originally the bride of a demon, but the demon rejected her in favor of her more attractive sister. Because of this, she resents Kanna for what she perceives as her being pampered and courted by four of the top demons at school. Momoko teams up with Hibiki with the intention of hurting Kanna, but she later learns the error of her ways. She eventually falls in love with Hibiki and they have a son named Kyoya together.
Shikiko Ejima (江島 四季子, Ejima Shikiko)
Portrayed by: Yukari Taki (film), Yui Miura (stage play); Voiced by: Naomi Iida
Shihiko is Kanna's classmate who resents her for capturing Kaki's attention.

== Media ==
=== Novels ===
Hana Oni is written by Risa. It was originally serialized on the original fiction website, Koheya no Komado (小部屋の小窓; lit. "The Little Window in the Little Room"), since 2004. It later received a print publication by East Press under the Regalo imprint, with illustrations provided by Yone Kazuki from Design Factory. In 2017, Kodansha re-released the series in bunkoban format under the Kodansha Bunko imprint.

No.	Japanese release date	Japanese ISBN
1	July 31, 2007 (East Press); September 13, 2017 (Kodansha)	978-4-87-257795-2 (East Press); ISBN 978-4-06-293637-8 (Kodansha)
2	October 18, 2008 (East Press); October 13, 2017 (Kodansha)	978-4-87-257983-3 (East Press); ISBN 978-4-06-293752-8 (Kodansha)
3	April 16, 2009 (East Press); April 13, 2018 (Kodansha)	978-4-78-160103-8 (East Press); ISBN 978-4-06-293873-0 (Kodansha)
4	July 16, 2009 (East Press); May 15, 2018 (Kodansha)	978-4-78-160181-6 (East Press); ISBN 978-4-06-293874-7 (Kodansha)

==== Spin-off ====
In addition to the main series, Risa released a spin-off novel titled Hana Oni: Shūen to Hajimari no Otome.

No.	Title	Japanese release date	Japanese ISBN
1	Hana Oni: Shūen to Hajimari no Otome (華鬼 終焉とはじまりの乙女)	March 9, 2011 (East Press)	978-4-78-160583-8 (East Press)

=== Film ===
In 2009, Tornado Film produced a trilogy titled Hana Oni: Trilogy (華鬼 三部作, Hana Oni: Sanbusaku). The first film, subtitled Kaki × Kanna (華鬼×神無編, Kaki to Kanna-hen), premiered on November 24, 2009, at Odaiba Cinema Mediage. The second film, subtitled Reiji × Moegi (麗二×もえぎ編, Reiji to Moegi-hen), premiered on November 28, 2009, at Marunouchi Toei 2. The third film, subtitled Hibiki × Momoko (響×桃子編, Hibiki to Momoko-hen), premiered on December 5, 2009, at Marunouchi Toei 2.

In 2019, AsianCrush licensed the films under the title Battle of Demons in English for non-Asian regions. The second and third films were retitled Battle of Demons 2 and Battle of Demons 3 respectively.

=== Stage play ===
A stage play adaptation ran in July 2010, starring then 14-year-old Ai Hazuki. The play had a second run in March 2011, with Hiroki Suzuki, Shion Tsuchiya, Motoki Ochiai, Kōsuke Kujirai as new cast replacements.

=== Video game ===
A video game adaptation titled Hana Oni: Koi Someru Koku Eikyū no Shirushi (華鬼 ～恋い初める刻 永久の印～; lit. "Demon of Floral Beauty: The Time When You Start Falling in Love") was produced by Idea Factory under their Otomate label. Yone Kazuki, who provided the illustrations to the original novel series, also provided artwork for the game. The game was released on the PlayStation Portable on March 17, 2011, as a visual novel dating simulation. A fan disc sequel titled Hana Oni: Yume no Tsuzuki (華鬼 ～夢のつづき～; lit. "Demon of Floral Beauty: The Dream Continues") was released on March 22, 2012, for the PlayStation Portable. Hana Oni: Yume no Tsuzuki sold 8,023 copes on its first week of release.

An audio drama CD featuring an original story was released on May 18, 2011, with the game's cast reprising their roles. A second drama CD was released on January 18, 2012.

== Reception ==
As of April 2010, over 300,000 physical copies of the book series have been sold.
