= Kei Hosogai =

Japanese actor and musician (born 1984)

- 細貝 圭
- Born: October 10, 1984 (age 41); Tokyo, Japan
- Occupations: Actor; singer; voice actor
- Years active: 2008–present
- Agent: GMB Production
- Height: 183 cm (6 ft 0 in)
- Spouse: Hitomi Satō (m. 2019; div. 2023)
- Musical career
- Genres: Rock; J-pop
- Instruments: Vocals; bass guitar
- Label: Avex Trax
- Website: www.gmbp.co.jp/..

Kei Hosogai (細貝 圭, Hosogai Kei; born October 10, 1984 in Tokyo) is a Japanese actor and musician associated with GMB Production. In 2008, he debuted as an actor as Hiyoshi Wakashi in Musical: The Prince of Tennis, and since then, has starred in multiple television, stage, and film productions, such as Battle of Demons (2009), Kaizoku Sentai Gokaiger (2011) and Ultraman Trigger: New Generation Tiga (2021). As a voice actor, he starred as Kaoru Hakaze from the Ensemble Stars! multimedia franchise.

In addition to his acting career, Hosogai was also the bassist for the rock band Cocoa Otoko from 2010 to 2012.

== Personal life ==
From ages 6–9 and 11–23, he lived in the United States, primarily in Seattle, Washington, and in the state of Hawaii; because of this, he is fluent in English. When he lived in Seattle, he attended a Japanese school every week from elementary to high school and was classmates with YouTuber Chika Yoshida (known as Bilingirl).

He married actress Hitomi Satō on October 10, 2019. On February 23, 2023, they announced they had divorced, citing they had grown apart.

== Filmography ==
=== Theatre ===
- Prince of Tennis: The Imperial Presence Hyotei as Hiyoshi Wakashi (2008)
- The Butterfly Effect as Alan Wilson (2008)
- Prince of Tennis: The Treasure Match Shitenhouji as Hiyoshi Wakashi (2009)
- Prince of Tennis: Dream Live 6 as Hiyoshi Wakashi (2009)
- Onna Nobunaga as Imagawa Yoshimoto (2009)
- Prince of Tennis: The Final Match Rikkai Second feat. The Rivals as Hiyoshi Wakashi (2009)
- Sengoku Basara as Sanada Yukimura (2010)
- Prince of Tennis: Dream Live 7 as Hiyoshi Wakashi (2010)
- Seimenjuu Youshi as Kanshin (2010)
- Tumbling as Izumi (2010)
- Onmyouji ~ Light and Shadow ~ as Karasu (2011)
- Sengoku Basara 3 as Sanada Yukimura (2011)
- Sengoku Basara 2 as Sanada Yukimura (2012)
- Troilus and Cressida Ajax (2012)
- Sengoku Basara 3: Setouchi Kyouran as Sanada Yukimura (2012)
- Shippo to Nakamatachi as ファン太 and Koyuki (2012)
- Tooi Natsu no Gogh (Metamorphosis Gogh) as Cervantes (2013)
- Sengoku Basara 3: Utage as Sanada Yukimura (2013)
- Bungo Stray Dogs on Stage: Dazai, Chūya, Age Fifteen as Randō (2021)

=== Films ===
- Takumi-kun Series 2: Nijiiro no Garasu as Izumi Takabayashi (2009)
- Bokura wa ano Sora no Shita de as Osamu Sawada (2009)
- Battle of Demons as Reiji Takatsuki (2009)
- Girl’s Life as Hayate (2009)
- Messiah as Tomokazu Shimada (2011)
- Kaizoku Sentai Gokaiger vs. Space Sheriff Gavan: The Movie as Basco Ta Jolokia (2012)
- Tokumei Sentai Go-Busters vs. Kaizoku Sentai Gokaiger: The Movie as Basco Ta Jolokia (2013)
- Uchu Sentai Kyuranger vs. Space Squad as Basco Ta Jolokia (2018)
- Kaizoku Sentai: Ten Gokaiger as Akiro Masukoda (2021)
- Ultraman Trigger: Episode Z as Ignis/Trigger Dark (2022)

=== Television ===
- Shitsuji Kissa ni Okaerinasaimase (ep 8) as Kusabue (2009)
- EXs Renai Hyakukei (2009)
- Heaven's Rock as Jun (2010)
- KTV's Ikemendel no Housoku (2010)
- Kaizoku Sentai Gokaiger as Basco Ta Jolokia (2011-2012)
- KTV's MOTEL (2011)
- Sky Perfect's LogxMen-COCOAOTOKO- (2011)
- Secret Girls: 2nd Season as Rei Sakurakoji (2012)
- Teri Ito no Sekai no Tabisetsu (2012)
- W Shitsuji ~ Ojousama, dochira ga okonomi desu ka? as Youji (2012)
- Ultraman Trigger: New Generation Tiga as Ignis/Trigger Dark (2021-2022)
- Ultraman New Generation Stars (S2) as Ignis (2024)

=== Music videos ===
- "Last Stage" by Ryo (2009)
- "A.S.A.P. ~Ima Sugu ni kaketsukete~" by Emi Maria (2011)

=== Video games ===
- Ensemble Stars! (2015–present) as Kaoru Hakaze
