= Ultraman Decker =

Japanese television series

- Title card
- Genre: Tokusatsu; Kaiju; Kyodai Hero; Science fiction; Drama
- Created by: Tsuburaya Productions
- Based on: Ultraman Dyna; by Naoyuki Edo; Kazuya Konaka
- Screenplay by: Junichiro Ashiki; Takao Nakano; Jun Tsugita; Naoki Hayashi; Aya Satsuki; Yukinobu Tsuruta
- Story by: Toshizo Nemoto
- Directed by: Masayoshi Takesue (Note: Series director. Episode directors are Takanori Tsujimoto, Koichi Sakamoto, Tomonobu Koshi, Naoyuki Uchida, Kazuhiro Nakagawa, and Kiyotaka Taguchi.)
- Starring: Hiroki Matsumoto; Yuka Murayama; Nobunaga Daichi; Yu Koyanagi; Sae Miyazawa; Masaya Kikawada
- Opening theme: "Wake up Decker!"; by Screen Mode
- Ending theme: "Kanata Tōku"; by Hironobu Kageyama; "Hikari Kanata"; by Hironobu Kageyama
- Composers: Kenichiro Suehiro; Masahiro Tokuda
- Country of origin: Japan
- Original language: Japanese
- No. of episodes: 25

Production
- Executive producer: Masahiro Onda
- Producers: Yusuke Okamoto; Junko Oishi; Hayato Saga
- Cinematography: Satoshi Murakawa
- Editor: Yosuke Yafune
- Running time: 25 minutes
- Production companies: Tsuburaya Productions; TV Tokyo; Dentsu

Original release
- Network: TXN (TV Tokyo)
- Release: July 9, 2022 – January 21, 2023

Related
- Ultraman Trigger; Ultraman Blazar

Ultraman Decker (ウルトラマンデッカー, Urutoraman Dekkā) is a Japanese tokusatsu drama produced by Tsuburaya Productions, as well as the 27th entry (37th overall) in the Ultra Series Series and the fourth in the Reiwa era. Decker serves as the sequel to Ultraman Trigger: New Generation Tiga and celebrating the 25th anniversary of Ultraman Dyna The series aired on TV Tokyo on July 9, 2022.

== Synopsis ==
Ultraman Decker takes place years after the end of Ultraman Trigger: New Generation Tiga, where Earth has entered a period of peace once again. When humanity begins their outer space exploration program and their monster attack countermeasures diminish at the same time, the Spheres launch their attacks, causing Earth to be desolated from the rest of the Solar System.

A store worker named Kanata Asumi obtains the Ultra D Flasher and becomes Ultraman Decker, using his newfound powers to repel the invading Sphere assaults. After a one-year period of training, Kanata gets enlisted into GUTS-Select, which consists of captain Taiji Murahoshi, Nursedessei operator Sawa Kaizaki, space exploratory artificial intelligence HANE2 and fellow TPU graduates Soma Ryumon and Ichika Kirino. In addition, Kanata/Decker obtains occasional help from Kengo Manaka/Ultraman Trigger, who was actively defending the Mars civilization from the remaining Sphere platoon. Late into the series, TPU's researcher Yuichiro Asakage reveals himself as Agams the Bazdo, an alien from the future who was responsible for the Sphere's invasion on Earth, doing so to prevent their invasion on Planet Bazdo and the death of his wife, Laelia, from ever happening. Decker Asumi, the true owner of Ultraman Decker's powers, tries to reclaim his mantle but finally puts his trust in his Kanata to continue his fight after seeing his ancestor obtaining Dynamic Type.

As the series approaches its end, Agams begins taking an active role in the frontlines by shrinking the Sphere Barrier and summoning the Mother Spheresaurus, the Sphere's progenitor, to escalate the end of Planet Earth. A visit from Laelia's spirit manages to redeem Agams at the last minute before his death but fails to stop Mother Spheresaurus from absorbing the energies from Eternity Core. Kengo/Trigger offers his help by siphoning the energy from Mother Spheresaurus to Kanata/Decker, who channels it in his final attack that kills the monster. Mother Spheresaurus' death results in the Spheres' total annihilation, as well as Earth finally reestablishing contact with outer space.

== Production ==
The show's name was first trademarked and registered by Tsuburaya Productions on November 29, 2021, and published on December 14, 2021.

Ultraman Decker and the titular Ultra were first announced by Tsuburaya Productions at the end of Ultraman Trigger: Episode Z as a post-credit scene. The show was later officially announced on March 31, 2022. As with Ultraman Trigger: New Generation Tiga, Decker continues to celebrate the TDG Heisei Trilogy series that consists of Ultraman Tiga, Dyna and Gaia, hence Decker itself representing Dyna as its modern-day retelling of the series. In addition, Hironobu Kageyama sings the ending theme, Kanata Tōku, returning exactly 25 years after performing for the second ending theme of Dyna.

According to director Takesue, while Decker inherited many aspects from Dyna, he aims to take the show's direction to a different approach from its source of inspiration. As such, the titular Ultra has his Color Timer's positioning at the left side of his pectoral and his chest bearing the image of the universe, but his overall design and silhouette is an attempt at returning to the image of Heisei era Ultras as a whole. In addition, the theme of the series is "future", as Decker focuses on what lies ahead in contrast of Trigger's themes of ancient era. Ultraman Decker is considered as the tenth entry to the New Generation Hero (ニュージェネレーションヒーロー, Nyū Jenerēshon Hīrō) series lineup that was introduced since Ultraman Ginga. In addition, the series' charm is to "make new ones", hence the show will be expected to introduce more new monsters in its run.

According to Hiroki Matsumoto, filming of Ultraman Decker started in December 2021.

== Episodes ==
| No. | Title | Directed by | Written by | Original release date |
|---|---|---|---|---|
| SP | "Ultraman Decker Preview Special"; Transliteration: "Urutoraman Dekkā Chokuzen Supesharu" (Japanese: ウルトラマンデッカー直前スペシャル) | N/A | N/A | July 2, 2022 |
| 1 | "Day of the Attack"; Transliteration: "Shūrai no Hi" (Japanese: 襲来の日) | Masayoshi Takesue | Toshizo Nemoto | July 9, 2022 |
| 2 | "Kanata's Resolve"; Transliteration: "Ketsui no Kanata" (Japanese: 決意のカナタ) | Masayoshi Takesue | Toshizo Nemoto | July 16, 2022 |
| 3 | "Move Out, GUTS-Select!"; Transliteration: "Shutsudō! Gattsu Serekuto" (Japanese: 出動！ GUTS-SELECT) | Masayoshi Takesue | Toshizo Nemoto | July 23, 2022 |
| 4 | "The Destructive Monster Awakens"; Transliteration: "Hakai-jū Kakusei" (Japanese: 破壊獣覚醒) | Takanori Tsujimoto | Takao Nakano | July 30, 2022 |
| 5 | "Glutton of the Lake"; Transliteration: "Mizuumi no Kuishinbō" (Japanese: 湖の食いしん坊) | Takanori Tsujimoto | Jun Tsugita | August 6, 2022 |
| SP | "The Return of Marluru"; Transliteration: "Marwuru no Kikan" (Japanese: マルゥルの帰還) | N/A | N/A | August 13, 2022 |
| 6 | "Subterranean Monster Appears! And Appears!"; Transliteration: "Chitei Kaijū Arawaru! Arawaru!" (Japanese: 地底怪獣現る！現る！) | Takanori Tsujimoto | Takao Nakano | August 20, 2022 |
| 7 | "The Light of Hope from The Red Planet"; Transliteration: "Kibō no Hikari, Akaki Hoshi yori" (Japanese: 希望の光、赤き星より) | Koichi Sakamoto | Naoki Hayashi | August 27, 2022 |
| 8 | "Light and Darkness, Again"; Transliteration: "Hikari to Yami, Futatabi" (Japanese: 光と闇、ふたたび) | Koichi Sakamoto | Naoki Hayashi | September 3, 2022 |
| 9 | "Standing Tall for Someone Special"; Transliteration: "Taga Tame no Yūshi" (Japanese: 誰がための勇姿) | Koichi Sakamoto | Aya Satsuki | September 10, 2022 |
| 10 | "Man and Monster"; Transliteration: "Hito to Kaijū" (Japanese: 人と怪獣) | Tomonobu Koshi | Toshizo Nemoto | September 17, 2022 |
| 11 | "Machine God Deployed"; Transliteration: "Kijin Shutsugeki" (Japanese: 機神出撃) | Tomonobu Koshi | Junichiro Ashiki | September 24, 2022 |
| 12 | "Neomegas Strikes Back"; Transliteration: "Neomegasu no Gyakushū" (Japanese: ネオメガスの逆襲) | Tomonobu Koshi | Junichiro Ashiki | October 1, 2022 |
| 13 | "Jumble Rock"; Transliteration: "Janburu Rokku" (Japanese: ジャンブル・ロック) | Naoyuki Uchida | Yukinobu Tsuruta | October 8, 2022 |
| 14 | "Birth of a Dark God"; Transliteration: "Majin Tanjō" (Japanese: 魔神誕生) | Masayoshi Takesue | Toshizo Nemoto | October 15, 2022 |
| 15 | "A Promise for Tomorrow"; Transliteration: "Asu e no Yakusoku" (Japanese: 明日への約束) | Masayoshi Takesue | Toshizo Nemoto | October 22, 2022 |
| 16 | "Stay as You Are"; Transliteration: "Kimi wa Kimi no Mama de" (Japanese: 君は君のままで) | Kazuhiro Nakagawa | Aya Satsuki | October 29, 2022 |
| 17 | "Investigation from the Past"; Transliteration: "Kako yori no Shirabe" (Japanese: 過去よりの調べ) | Kazuhiro Nakagawa | Jun Tsugita | November 5, 2022 |
| SP | "The Threat of the Terraphaser"; Transliteration: "Terafeizā no Kyōi" (Japanese: テラフェイザーの脅威) | N/A | N/A | November 12, 2022 |
| 18 | "Invitation from Another Dimension"; Transliteration: "Ijigen kara no Izanai" (Japanese: 異次元からのいざない) | Koichi Sakamoto | Naoki Hayashi | November 19, 2022 |
| 19 | "Warriors on the Moon"; Transliteration: "Getsumen no Senshi-tachi" (Japanese: 月面の戦士たち) | Koichi Sakamoto | Naoki Hayashi | November 26, 2022 |
| 20 | "Lord Ragon"; Transliteration: "Ragon-sama" (Japanese: らごんさま) | Kiyotaka Taguchi | Takao Nakano | December 3, 2022 |
| 21 | "The Price of Prosperity"; Transliteration: "Han'ei no Daishō" (Japanese: 繁栄の代償) | Kiyotaka Taguchi | Junichiro Ashiki | December 10, 2022 |
| 22 | "The Fall of Bazdo"; Transliteration: "Suibō no Bazudo" (Japanese: 衰亡のバズド) | Takanori Tsujimoto | Junichiro Ashiki | December 17, 2022 |
| 23 | "The Sky of Despair"; Transliteration: "Zetsubō no Sora" (Japanese: 絶望の空) | Takanori Tsujimoto | Toshizo Nemoto | December 24, 2022 |
| SP | "Stand Up, Decker"; Transliteration: "Tachiagare Dekkā" (Japanese: 立ち上がれデッカー) | N/A | N/A | January 7, 2023 |
| 24 | "End of a Dream"; Transliteration: "Yume no Hate" (Japanese: 夢の果て) | Masayoshi Takesue | Toshizo Nemoto | January 14, 2023 |
| 25 | "The Light Far Beyond"; Transliteration: "Kanata no Hikari" (Japanese: 彼方の光) | Masayoshi Takesue | Toshizo Nemoto | January 21, 2023 |

== Spin-off program ==
GUTS-Select Exchange Report: Special Section 3 Returns (GUTS-SELECT交流記 ～帰ってきた特務3課～, Gattsu Serekuto Kōryū-ki Kaettekita Tokumu San-ka) is a Tsuburaya Imagination-exclusive spin-off program released on October 1, 2022. In addition to Masamichi Hotta and Marluru reappearing, each episode also features one of the members of the reformed GUTS-Select.

1. The Case of Sawa Kaizaki (カイザキ サワの場合, Kaizaki Sawa no Baai)
2. The Case of Kanata Asumi (アスミ カナタの場合, Asumi Kanata no Baai)
3. The Case of Ichika Kirino (キリノ イチカの場合, Kirino Ichika no Baai)
4. The Case of Soma Ryumon (リュウモン ソウマの場合, Ryūmon Sōma no Baai)
5. The Case of Taiji Murahoshi (ムラホシ タイジの場合, Murahoshi Taiji no Baai)

== Ultraman Decker Finale: Journey to Beyond ==
Ultraman Decker Finale: Journey to Beyond (ウルトラマンデッカー最終章 旅立ちの彼方へ…, Urutoraman Dekkā Saishūshō Tabidachi no Kanata e…) is a film exclusively for pay per view content in Tsuburaya Imagination, released on February 23, 2023. The movie takes place after the end of Ultraman Decker and features former AKB48 member Kayano Nakamura (中村 加弥乃, Nakamura Kayano) as a guest actress.

== Cast ==
- Kanata Asumi (アスミ カナタ, Asumi Kanata), Ultraman Decker (Voice): Hiroki Matsumoto (松本 大輝, Matsumoto Hiroki)
- Ichika Kirino (キリノ イチカ, Kirino Ichika): Yuka Murayama (村山 優香, Murayama Yūka)
- Soma Ryumon (リュウモン ソウマ, Ryūmon Sōma): Nobunaga Daichi (大地 伸永, Daichi Nobunaga)
- Yuichiro Asakage (アサカゲ ユウイチロウ, Asakage Yūichirō)/Agams the Bazdo (バズド星人アガムス, Bazudo Seijin Agamusu): Yu Koyanagi (小柳 友, Koyanagi Yū)
- Sawa Kaizaki (カイザキ サワ, Kaizaki Sawa): Sae Miyazawa (宮澤 佐江, Miyazawa Sae)
- Taiji Murahoshi (ムラホシ タイジ, Murahoshi Taiji): Masaya Kikawada (黄川田 雅哉, Kikawada Masaya)

=== Voice cast ===
- HANE2 (エイチ・エー・エヌ・イー・ツー, Eichi Ē Enu Ī Tsū): Hiroshi Tsuchida (土田 大, Tsuchida Hiroshi)
- Ultra D Flasher (ウルトラDフラッシャー, Urutora Dī Furasshā), Narrator (SPs): Gakuto Kajiwara (梶原 岳人, Kajiwara Gakuto)

=== Guest cast ===
- Mayor Hamano (浜野町長, Hamano-chōchō; 4): Masami Horiuchi (堀内 正美, Horiuchi Masami)
- Masamichi Hotta (ホッタ マサミチ, Hotta Masamichi; SP2–4): Munetoshi Takubo (田久保 宗稔, Takubo Munetoshi)
- Marluru (マルゥル, Marwuru; Voice; SP2, 13, SP3–4): M・A・O
- Kengo Manaka (マナカ ケンゴ, Manaka Kengo; 7–8, 19, 24–25), Ultraman Trigger (ウルトラマントリガー, Urutoraman Torigā; Voice; 7–8, 19, 23-25): Raiga Terasaka (寺坂 頼我, Terasaka Raiga)
- Yuzare (ユザレ; 7), Yuna Shizuma (シズマ ユナ, Shizuma Yuna; 8): Runa Toyoda (豊田 ルナ, Toyoda Runa)
- Akito Hijiri (ヒジリ アキト, Hijiri Akito; 7): Shunya Kaneko (金子 隼也, Kaneko Shun'ya)
- Seiya Tatsumi (タツミ セイヤ, Tatsumi Seiya; 7): Katsuya Takagi (高木 勝也, Takagi Katsuya)
- Carmeara (カルミラ, Karumira; Voice; 7–8): Sumire Uesaka (上坂 すみれ, Uesaka Sumire)
- Grace (グレース, Gurēsu; 9): Koji Nakamura (中村 浩二, Nakamura Kōji)
- Decker Asumi (デッカー・アスミ, Dekkā Asumi; 14–15): Masashi Taniguchi (谷口 賢志, Taniguchi Masashi)
- Yuji Hiyama (ヒヤマ ユウジ, Hiyama Yūji; 21): Shohei Abe (阿部 翔平, Abe Shōhei)
- Terumi Yazaki (ヤザキ テルミ, Yazaki Terumi; SP4): Shio Yamazaki (山﨑 紫生, Yamazaki Shio)

== Songs ==
Opening theme

- "Wake up Decker!"
  - Lyrics: Yohei Matsui (松井 洋平, Matsui Yōhei)
  - Composition & Arrangement: Masatomo Ota (太田 雅友, Ōta Masatomo)
  - Artist: SCREEN mode
  - Episodes: 1-13 (Verse 1), 14-24 (Verse 2)
  In episode 25, this song is used as an insert song.

Ending themes

- "Kanata Tōku" (カナタトオク; "Faraway in the Distance")
  - Arrangement: Shiho Terada (寺田 志保, Terada Shiho)
  - Lyrics, Composition, & Artist: Hironobu Kageyama (影山 ヒロノブ, Kageyama Hironobu)
  - Episodes: 1-13
- "Hikari Kanata" (ヒカリカナタ; "Light Faraway")
  - Arrangement: Kenshiro (ケンシロー, Kenshirō)
  - Lyrics, Composition, & Artist: Hironobu Kageyama
  - Episodes: 14-25

== International broadcast ==
In Hong Kong, this series aired on ViuTV on October 8, 2022.

In Malaysia, this series aired on Astro Ceria on November 8, 2022, with Malay dubbed.

In Philippines, this series will be air on TV5 in 2024 with Filipino dubbed.

== See also ==
- Ultra Series – Complete list of official Ultraman-related shows
