= Ultraman Trigger: New Generation Tiga =

Japanese TV series

- Title card
- Genre: Tokusatsu; Kyodai Hero; Kaiju; Science fiction
- Created by: Tsuburaya Productions
- Based on: Ultraman Tiga; by Masakazu Migita; Shingo Matsubara
- Screenplay by: Junichiro Ashiki; Toshizo Nemoto; Keigo Koyanagi; Sotaro Hayashi; Sumio Uetake; Jun Tsugita
- Story by: Naoki Hayashi
- Directed by: Koichi Sakamoto (Note: Series director. Episodes directors are Masayoshi Takesue, Kiyotaka Taguchi, Takanori Tsujimoto, Tomonobu Koshi, and Naoyuki Uchida.)
- Starring: Raiga Terasaka; Luna Toyoda; Shunya Kaneko; Tadashi Mizuno; Meiku Harukawa; Katsuya Takagi; Kei Hosogai; Shin Takuma
- Voices of: M.A.O; Sumire Uesaka; Shunichi Maki; Ryosuke Takahashi
- Narrated by: Maxwell Powers
- Opening theme: "Trigger"; by Takao Sakuma
- Ending theme: "Nanairo no Tane"; by Chou Cho; "Asu Miru Mono-tachi"; by Kengo Manaka, Yuna Shizuma & Akito Hijiri
- Composer: Go Sakabe
- Country of origin: Japan
- Original language: Japanese
- No. of episodes: 25

Production
- Executive producer: Masahiro Onda
- Producers: Kazuyuki Murayama; Junko Oishi; Hayato Saga
- Cinematography: Satoshi Murakawa
- Editor: Yosuke Yafune
- Running time: 25 minutes
- Production companies: Tsuburaya Productions; TV Tokyo; Dentsu

Original release
- Network: TXN (TV Tokyo)
- Release: July 10, 2021 – January 22, 2022

Related
- Ultraman Z; Ultraman Decker

Ultraman Trigger: New Generation Tiga (ウルトラマントリガー NEW GENERATION TIGA, Urutoraman Torigā Nyū Jenerēshon Tiga) is a Japanese tokusatsu drama series produced by Tsuburaya Productions. As the 26th entry (36th overall) in the Ultra Series and the third in the Reiwa era. the show presents itself as a modern retelling of Ultraman Tiga, while also celebrating its 25th anniversary and commemorate its 55th anniversary of the franchise. It premiered on TV Tokyo on July 10, 2021.

== Synopsis ==
Ultraman Trigger follows the story of Martian botanist Kengo Manaka, who is bonded to the titular Ultra when the three Giants of Darkness are resurrected from their ancient seal to claim the Eternity Core and threaten the safety of the universe. Following his fight with Golba and Carmeara on Mars, Kengo is drafted into the defense team GUTS-Select on Earth, where he continues to defend mankind from both the forces of evil and daily monster attacks while at the same time trying to protect Yuna, whose status as Yuzare's descendant makes her an open target to their enemies. As the story progresses, Kengo and his friends learn of Trigger's past association with the Giants of Darkness and eventually find themselves responsible for the Ultra's turn to light after a time travel incident into the past. While Trigger gains a portion of Eternity Core to further strengthen himself, the Ultra's dark energy bonds with the Lishurian treasure hunter Ignis, who uses its power as part of his vendetta against Hudram for the loss of his home planet.

Upon learning of Kengo's involvement in the past, the Giants of Darkness started to lose their unity as each member had their interests hindering their original goal of obtaining the Eternity Core. Hudram's attempt at breaking away from Carmeara resulted in his death by Ignis/Trigger Dark, while Darrgon was brainwashed against his will after he begins to acknowledge mankind's worth, forcing him to be given mercy kill to end his suffering. With her former comrades' essence absorbed and Yuna being captured, Carmeara mutated herself into the monster Megalothor once establishing a contract with the Eternity Core, dooming both the Earth and the universe itself. In the last resort tactic, Trigger briefly reabsorbed his darker half to fight on par with the destroyer and put an end to Carmeara's reign of terror. At the end of the series, Kengo/Trigger merges with the Eternity Core to stabilize its energy and save the universe from a second Big Bang, his friends hoping to see him again one day.

== Production and casting ==
Ultraman Trigger was announced by Tsuburaya Productions on April 15, 2021. According to director Koichi Sakamoto, the series is intended to be Ultraman Tiga recreated in the modern day interpretation for the current generation of audience to enjoy, in addition to those grew up watching Tiga. Additional cast members were announced in June 10 during an online event that introduces the main cast members, in addition to the voice actors. Electronic company Mirai-Labo announced their collaboration in the series.

Sakamoto included various situations alluding to the real life, such as GUTS Falcon being remote controlled akin to unmanned aerial vehicle and Kengo's habit of cheering others with his smile to provide comfort to the children in a similar sense to his previous work in Kamen Rider Fourze.

Remembering that Ultraman Tiga delivered a huge impact to the audience in 1996 to 1997, Sakamoto aims to reinvoke the same element (in addition to those of Ultraman Dyna and Gaia from the TDG trilogy series) into Trigger while maintaining both shows as separate entities. The titular hero, Ultraman Trigger, had his design and Type Change forms proposed by Sakamoto to be based on American comic book superheroes, having observed their changes in costumes over the years. Trigger's weapon, the Circle Arms, is an addition to the series that takes cues from combat weapons of Ultra Warriors of New Generation Heroes instalments and will also serve as a crucial key item in the future.

Director Masayoshi Takesue confirms Trigger to be the ninth entry in New Generation Hero (ニュージェネレーションヒーロー, Nyū Jenerēshon Hīrō) series lineup since Ultraman Ginga, despite its little relation to its predecessors.

== Episodes ==
No.	Title	Directed by	Written by	Original release date
0	"Ultraman Trigger Preview Special: Protect the Smiles, the Light of Hope"; Transliteration: "Urutoraman Torigā Chokuzen Supesharu Egao o Mamoru, Kibō no Hikari" (Japanese: 『ウルトラマントリガー』直前スペシャル ～笑顔を守る、希望の光～)	N/A	N/A	July 3, 2021
1	"Connection of Light"; Transliteration: "Hikari o Tsunagu Mono" (Japanese: 光を繋ぐもの)	Koichi Sakamoto	Naoki Hayashi	July 10, 2021
2	"Leap to the Future"; Transliteration: "Mirai e no Hishō" (Japanese: 未来への飛翔)	Koichi Sakamoto	Naoki Hayashi	July 17, 2021
3	"The Ultra-Ancient Light and Darkness"; Transliteration: "Chō Kodai no Hikari to Yami" (Japanese: 超古代の光と闇)	Koichi Sakamoto	Naoki Hayashi	July 24, 2021
4	"For Smiles"; Transliteration: "Egao no Tame ni" (Japanese: 笑顔のために)	Masayoshi Takesue	Toshizo Nemoto	July 31, 2021
SP	"The Power to Protect Peace"; Transliteration: "Heiwa o Mamoru Chikara" (Japanese: 平和を守る力)	N/A	N/A	August 7, 2021
SP	"Heroes Who Soar Through Space"; Transliteration: "Sora o Kakeru Eiyū" (Japanese: 宇宙を翔る英雄)	N/A	N/A	August 14, 2021
5	"Akito's Promise"; Transliteration: "Akito no Yakusoku" (Japanese: アキトの約束)	Masayoshi Takesue	Toshizo Nemoto	August 21, 2021
6	"The One Hour Demon"; Transliteration: "Ichi-jikan no Akuma" (Japanese: 一時間の悪魔)	Masayoshi Takesue	Toshizo Nemoto	August 28, 2021
7	"Inter Universe"; Transliteration: "Intā Yunibāsu" (Japanese: インター・ユニバース)	Kiyotaka Taguchi	Keigo Koyanagi	September 4, 2021
8	"The Propagating Invasion"; Transliteration: "Hanshoku Suru Shinryaku" (Japanese: 繁殖する侵略)	Kiyotaka Taguchi	Keigo Koyanagi	September 11, 2021
9	"The Wings of That Day"; Transliteration: "Ano Hi no Tsubasa" (Japanese: あの日の翼)	Takanori Tsujimoto	Sotaro Hayashi	September 18, 2021
10	"Wavering Heart"; Transliteration: "Yureru Kokoro" (Japanese: 揺れるココロ)	Takanori Tsujimoto	Sotaro Hayashi	September 25, 2021
11	"The Encounter of Light and Darkness"; Transliteration: "Hikari to Yami no Kaikō" (Japanese: 光と闇の邂逅)	Masayoshi Takesue	Naoki Hayashi	October 2, 2021
12	"The 30-Million-Year Miracle"; Transliteration: "Sanzenman-nen no Kiseki" (Japanese: 三千万年の奇跡)	Masayoshi Takesue	Naoki Hayashi	October 9, 2021
13	"The Marked Captain: Detective Marluru's Case File"; Transliteration: "Nerawareta Taichō Marwuru Tantei no Jiken-bo" (Japanese: 狙われた隊長 ～マルゥル探偵の事件簿～)	Naoyuki Uchida	Junichiro Ashiki	October 16, 2021
14	"The Golden Threat"; Transliteration: "Kogane no Kyōi" (Japanese: 黄金の脅威)	Koichi Sakamoto	Junichiro Ashiki	October 23, 2021
15	"Operation Dragon"; Transliteration: "Operēshon Doragon" (Japanese: オペレーションドラゴン)	Koichi Sakamoto	Junichiro Ashiki	October 30, 2021
16	"Sneering Destruction"; Transliteration: "Warau Metsubō" (Japanese: 嗤う滅亡)	Tomonobu Koshi	Sumio Uetake	November 6, 2021
17	"Raging Feast"; Transliteration: "Ikaru Kyōen" (Japanese: 怒る饗宴)	Tomonobu Koshi	Sumio Uetake	November 13, 2021
18	"Smile Operation No.1"; Transliteration: "Sumairu Sakusen Dai Ichi-gō" (Japanese: スマイル作戦第一号)	Kiyotaka Taguchi	Toshizo Nemoto	November 20, 2021
19	"What Makes a Savior"; Transliteration: "Kyūseishu no Shikaku" (Japanese: 救世主の資格)	Kiyotaka Taguchi	Toshizo Nemoto	November 27, 2021
SP	"Blooming Flowers of Evil"; Transliteration: "Sakimidareru Aku no Hana" (Japanese: 咲き乱れる悪の華)	N/A	N/A	December 4, 2021
20	"The Blue One Comes With the Lightning"; Transliteration: "Aoi Aitsu wa Raigeki to Tomo ni" (Japanese: 青いアイツは雷撃と共に)	Takanori Tsujimoto	Jun Tsugita	December 11, 2021
21	"Demons Rampage Again"; Transliteration: "Akuma ga Futatabi" (Japanese: 悪魔がふたたび)	Takanori Tsujimoto	Jun Tsugita	December 18, 2021
22	"Last Game"; Transliteration: "Rasuto Gēmu" (Japanese: ラストゲーム)	Takanori Tsujimoto	Junichiro Ashiki	December 25, 2021
23	"My Friend"; Transliteration: "Mai Furendo" (Japanese: マイフレンド)	Koichi Sakamoto	Naoki Hayashi	January 8, 2022
24	"The Ruler of Shadows"; Transliteration: "Yami no Shihaisha" (Japanese: 闇の支配者)	Koichi Sakamoto	Naoki Hayashi	January 15, 2022
25	"To the Ones Who Believe in Smiles: Pull the Trigger"; Transliteration: "Egao o Shinjiru Mono-tachi e Puru Za Torigā" (Japanese: 笑顔を信じるものたちへ ～PULL THE TRIGGER～)	Koichi Sakamoto	Naoki Hayashi	January 22, 2022

== Spin-off programs ==
=== Marlu-Dex ===
Marlu-Dex (マルっとナビ, Marutto Nabi) is a Tsuburaya Imagination-exclusive spin-off program hosted by the Alien Metron Marluru, who provides explanations and hindsight to the appearing Ultra Heroes, Kaiju and object of interest in Ultraman Trigger: New Generation Tiga.

1. Ultraman Trigger Multi Type (ウルトラマントリガー マルチタイプ, Urutoraman Torigā Maruchi Taipu)
2. Ultraman Trigger Power Type (ウルトラマントリガー パワータイプ, Urutoraman Torigā Pawā Taipu)
3. Ultraman Trigger Sky Type (ウルトラマントリガー スカイタイプ, Urutoraman Torigā Sukai Taipu)
4. GUTS Falcon (GUTSファルコン, Gattsu Farukon)
5. GUTS Sparklence (GUTSスパークレンス, Gattsu Supākurensu)
6. Planetary Destruction God Satandelos (惑星破壊神サタンデロス, Wakusei Hakai-shin Satanderosu)
7. Ultraman Z (ウルトラマンゼット, Urutoraman Zetto)
8. King Joe STORAGE Custom (キングジョーストレイジカスタム, Kingu Jō Sutoreiji Kasutamu)
9. Petrification Evil Monster Gargorgon (石化魔獣ガーゴルゴン, Sekika Majū Gāgorugon)
10. Herculean Fighter Darrgon (剛力闘士ダーゴン, Gōriki Tōshi Dāgon)
11. Agile Tactician Hudram (俊敏策士ヒュドラム, Shunbin Sakushi Hyudoramu)
12. Ultraman Trigger (ウルトラマントリガー, Urutoraman Torigā)
13. Alien Metron "Marluru" (メトロン星人マルゥル, Metoron Seijin Marwuru)
14. Absolutian (アブソリューティアン, Abusoryūtian)
15. Ultraman Ribut (ウルトラマンリブット, Urutoraman Ributto)
16. Dark Champion Trigger Dark (闇黒勇士トリガーダーク, Ankoku Yūshi Torigā Dāku)
17. Nursedessei (ナースデッセイ号, Nāsudessei-gō)
18. Ultra-Ancient Dark Monster Golba (超古代闇怪獣ゴルバー, Chō Kodai Yami Kaijū Gorubā)
19. Ultraman Tiga (ウルトラマンティガ, Urutoraman Tiga)
20. Electroshock Beastman Barriguiler (電撃獣人バリガイラー, Dengeki Jūjin Barigairā)
21. Aboras and Banila (アボラス・バニラ, Aborasu Banira)
22. Clockwork Warrior Mecha Musashin (カラクリ武者メカムサシン, Karakuri Musha Meka Musashin)
23. Captivating Warrior Carmeara (妖麗戦士カルミラ, Yōrei Senshi Karumira)
24. Evil God Megalothor (邪神メガロゾーア, Jashin Megarozōa)
25. Trigger Truth (トリガートゥルース, Torigā Turūsu)

=== Secret Origins of the Nursedessei: The Struggle of Special Section 3 ===
Secret Origins of the Nursedessei: The Struggle of Special Section 3 (ナースデッセイ開発秘話～特務3課奮闘記～, Nāsudessei Kaihatsu Hiwa Tokumu San-ka Funtō-ki) is the second Tsuburaya Imagination-exclusive spin-off program serving as a prequel to Ultraman Trigger: New Generation Tiga. Before she was enlisted in the GUTS-Select, Marluru was a member of TPU's Department of Technological Development: Special Section 3 (技術部・特務3課, Gijutsu-bu Tokumu San-ka).

In addition to M・A・O reprising her voice role as Marluru, it also introduces Munetoshi Takubo (田久保 宗稔, Takubo Munetoshi) as Masamichi Hotta (ホッタ マサミチ, Hotta Masamichi) and Shio Yamazaki (山﨑 紫生, Yamazaki Shio) as Terumi Yazaki (ヤザキ テルミ, Yazaki Terumi).

1. Hotta and Marluru (ホッタとマルゥル, Hotta to Marwuru)
2. Accountant Terumi (経理のテルミちゃん, Keiri no Terumi-chan)
3. The Second Alien (第2の宇宙人, Dai Ni no Uchūjin)
4. Don't Forget the Main Point (本題を忘れるな, Hondai o Wasureru na)
5. The Genius High Schooler (天才高校生, Tensai Kōkō-sei)
6. Its Name Is the GUTS Falcon (その名はGUTSファルコン, Sono Na wa Gattsu Farukon)
7. Find Hints (ヒントを探せ, Hinto o Sagase)
8. Presentation (プレゼン, Purezen)
9. Switch the Control System (操縦系を切り替えろ, Sōjū-kei o Kirikaero)
10. A Break (休息, Kyūsoku)
11. The GUTS Falcon Remodeling Plan (ガッツファルコン改造計画, Gattsu Farukon Kaizō Keikaku)
12. A New Battleship (新型戦闘艇, Shingata Sentō-tei)
13. The Alien Meeting (宇宙人会議, Uchūjin Kaigi)
14. Alien Wild (ワイルド星人, Wairudo Seijin)
15. Space Dragon Nurse (宇宙竜ナース, Uchū Ryū Nāsu)
16. Michiru Is Here! (ミチルが来た！, Michiru ga Kita!)
17. The Full Picture of the New Model (新型の全貌, Shingata no Zenbō)
18. A Demon for Accounting (経理の鬼, Keiri no Oni)
19. Naming (命名, Meimei)
20. Determine the Layout (レイアウトを決めろ, Reiauto o Kimero)
21. The Second Alien Meeting (第2回宇宙人会議, Dai Ni-kai Uchūjin Kaigi)
22. Command Room (司令室, Shirei-shitsu)
23. GUTS-SELECT
24. Completed, and...... (完成、そして……, Kansei, Soshite......)
25. Goodbye, Marluru (さよならマルゥル, Sayonara Marwuru)

=== Galaxy Rescue Force Voice Drama ===
Galaxy Rescue Force Voice Drama (ギャラクシーレスキューフォース ボイスドラマ, Gyarakushī Resukyū Fōsu Boisu Dorama) is a spin-off that is set to air in Tsuburaya Production's YouTube channel while coinciding with the premier of Ultraman Trigger: New Generation Tiga. It follows the exploits of Galaxy Rescue Force members during their adventures.

The main cast also includes Wataru Komada and Megumi Han (潘 めぐみ, Han Megumi) reprising their roles as Ultraman Ribut and Sora respectively from Ultra Galaxy Fight miniseries.

1. Initiation (入隊, Nyūtai)
2. Sora (ソラ)
3. Andro Melos (アンドロメロス, Andoro Merosu)
4. Man of the Science Technology Bureau (科技局の男, Ka-gi-kyoku no Otoko)
5. Queen Izana (イザナ女王, Izana-joō)
6. The Strongest and Fastest Ultraman (最強最速のウルトラマン, Saikyō Saisoku no Urutoraman)
7. The Elite Task Force Warrior (勇士司令部の戦士, Yūshi Shirei-bu no Senshi)
8. The Meeting (会談, Kaidan)
9. Kenis the Space Agent (宇宙工作員 ケニス, Uchū Kōsaku-in Kenisu)
10. Universal Justice (宇宙正義, Uchū Seigi)
11. Stars and Flowers and... (花と星と, Hana to Hoshi to)
12. Master's Teachings (師の教え, Shi no Oshie)
13. A New Member (新メンバー, Shin Menbā)
14. Poccola (ポッコラ, Pokkora)
15. Dream Match (ドリームマッチ, Dorīmu Matchi)
16. The Veteran's Techniques (歴戦の技, Rekisen no Waza)
17. Monster Planet (怪獣惑星, Kaijū Wakusei)
18. Scout (スカウト, Sukauto)
19. Alien Babarue RB (ババルウ星人RB, Babarū Seijin Āru Bī)
20. Homecoming (帰郷, Kikyō)
21. Training (訓練, Kunren)
22. Music Is Magic (歌は魔法, Uta wa Mahō)
23. Discussion (相談, Sōdan)
24. The Truant (サボり癖, Saboriguse)
25. Nova (ノーバ, Nōba)
26. The Letter (手紙, Tegami)
27. Date (デート, Dēto)
28. I'd Give Even My Life (命に代えても, Inochi ni Kaete mo)

=== Ultra Galaxy Fight: The Destined Crossroad ===
Ultra Galaxy Fight: The Destined Crossroad (ウルトラギャラクシーファイト 運命の衝突, Urutora Gyarakushī Faito Unmei no Shōtotsu) is the third instalment of the Ultra Galaxy Fight miniseries that is set to air in 2022. Absolutians Tartarus and Diavolo, as well as Ultraman Ribut, will appear in Trigger after the events of The Destined Crossroad.

=== Ultraman Trigger: Episode Z ===
Ultraman Trigger: Episode Z (ウルトラマントリガー エピソードZ, Urutoraman Torigā Episōdo Zetto) is a film released on Tsuburaya Imagination and in Japanese theaters on March 18, 2022.

== Cast ==
- Kengo Manaka (マナカ ケンゴ, Manaka Kengo), Ultraman Trigger (Voice): Raiga Terasaka (寺坂 頼我, Terasaka Raiga)
- Yuna Shizuma (シズマ ユナ, Shizuma Yuna), Yuzare (ユザレ): Luna Toyoda (豊田 ルナ, Toyoda Runa)
- Akito Hijiri (ヒジリ アキト, Hijiri Akito): Shunya Kaneko (金子 隼也, Kaneko Shun'ya)
- Tesshin Sakuma (サクマ テッシン, Sakuma Tesshin): Tadashi Mizuno (水野 直, Mizuno Tadashi)
- Himari Nanase (ナナセ ヒマリ, Nanase Himari): Meiku Harukawa (春川 芽生, Harukawa Meiku)
- Seiya Tatsumi (タツミ セイヤ, Tatsumi Seiya): Katsuya Takagi (高木 勝也, Takagi Katsuya)
- Ignis (イグニス, Igunisu)/Trigger Dark (トリガーダーク, Torigā Dāku; Voice): Kei Hosogai (細貝 圭, Hosogai Kei)
- Mitsukuni Shizuma (シズマ ミツクニ, Shizuma Mitsukuni): Shin Takuma (宅麻 伸, Takuma Shin)

=== Voice cast ===
- Marluru (マルゥル, Marwuru): M・A・O
- Carmeara (カルミラ, Karumira): Sumire Uesaka (上坂 すみれ, Uesaka Sumire) (Note: Sumire Uesaka also portrays Carmeara's human form in episode 15.)
- Darrgon (ダーゴン, Dāgon): Shunichi Maki (真木 駿一, Maki Shun'ichi)
- Hudram (ヒュドラム, Hyudoramu): Ryosuke Takahashi (高橋 良輔, Takahashi Ryōsuke)
- GUTS Sparklence (GUTSスパークレンス, Gattsu Supākurensu), GUTS Hyper Keys (GUTSハイパーキー, Gattsu Haipā Kī), Narrator (0, SP): Maxwell Powers (マックスウェル・パワーズ, Makkusuweru Pawāzu)

=== Guest cast ===
- Reina Manaka (マナカ レイナ, Manaka Reina; 1-2, 24): Megumi Yokoyama (横山 めぐみ, Yokoyama Megumi)
- Haruki Natsukawa (ナツカワ ハルキ, Natsukawa Haruki; 7–8): Kohshu Hirano (平野 宏周, Hirano Kōshū)
- Yoko Nakashima (ナカシマ ヨウコ, Nakashima Yōko; Voice; 7): Rima Matsuda (松田 リマ, Matsuda Rima)
- Ultraman Z (ウルトラマンゼット, Urutoraman Zetto; Voice; 7–8): Tasuku Hatanaka (畠中 祐, Hanata Tasuku)
- Beliarok (ベリアロク, Beriaroku; Voice; 7–8): Yūki Ono (小野 友樹, Ono Yūki)
- Yurika Shizuma (シズマ ユリカ, Shizuma Yurika; 9): Rina Aizawa (逢沢 りな, Aizawa Rina)
- Human Form Ribut (青年リブット, Seinen Ributto; 14–15): Shimba Tsuchiya (土屋 神葉, Tsuchiya Shinba)
- Ultraman Ribut (ウルトラマンリブット, Urutoraman Ributto; Voice; 14–15): Wataru Komada (駒田 航, Komada Wataru)
- Absolute Tartarus (アブソリュートタルタロス, Abusoryūto Tarutarosu; Voice; 14–15): Junichi Suwabe (諏訪部 順一, Suwabe Jun'ichi)
- Absolute Diavolo (アブソリュートディアボロ, Abusoryūto Diaboro; Voice; 14–15): Teruaki Ogawa (小川 輝晃, Ogawa Teruaki)

== Songs ==
Opening theme

- "Trigger"
  - Lyrics, Composition, & Arrangement: R・O・N
  - Artist: Takao Sakuma (佐久間 貴生, Sakuma Takao)
  - Episodes: 1–13 (Verse 1), 14–24 (Verse 2)
  In episode 25, this song is used as an insert song.

Ending themes

- "Nanairo no Tane" (なないろのたね; "Rainbow Seeds")
  - Arrangement: Jun Murayama (村山☆潤, Murayama Jun)
  - Lyrics, Composition, & Artist: ChouCho
  - Episodes: 1–13
- "Asu Miru Mono-tachi" (明日見る者たち; "Those Who See Tomorrow")
  - Lyrics: Shio Watanabe (渡部 紫緒, Watanabe Shio)
  - Composition & Arrangement: Go Sakabe (坂部 剛, Sakabe Gō)
  - Artist: Kengo Manaka (Raiga Terasaka), Yuna Shizuma (Luna Toyoda), & Akito Hijiri (Shunya Kaneko)
  - Episodes: 14, 16–25
- "Ultra Boot Camp!" (ウルトラ・BOOT CAMP！, Urutora Būto Kyanpu!)
  - Lyrics: Yohei Matsui (松井 洋平, Matsui Yōhei)
  - Composition & Arrangement: AstroNoteS
  - Artist: Ribut (Shimba Tsuchiya)
  - Episodes: 15

== International broadcast ==
In Hong Kong, this series aired on ViuTV on March 26, 2022. In Philippines, this series will be air on TV5 in 2024. In Vietnam, this series aired on FPT Play on June 22, 2024.

== See also ==
- Ultra Series – Complete list of official Ultraman-related shows.
