= List of Idolish7 episodes =

Japanese anime television series episodes

This is a list of episodes for the Japanese anime television series Idolish7. It was announced during a Niconico livestream event on August 19, 2016. The 17-episode anime premiered on December 31, 2017, and ended on May 19, 2018. Makoto Bessho is directing the anime at Troyca while Ayumi Sekine is supervising the anime's scripts. Kazumi Fukagawa is adapting Arina Tanemura's original designs for animation. Ei Aoki is credited as supervisor. Crunchyroll licensed the series for streaming as the anime simultaneously airs in Japan.

A second season was announced on July 7, 2018. The second season, titled Idolish7: Second Beat! aired from April 5 to December 27, 2020, with the cast and staff returning to reprise their roles. On April 13, 2020, it was announced that after the fourth episode, the remaining episodes of the season had been delayed due to the effect of the COVID-19 pandemic. On August 20, 2020, it was announced that the season will resume with the third episode on October 4, 2020.

On December 27, 2020, after the second season's finale, it was announced the series would be receiving a third season, titled Idolish7: Third Beat!. The cast and staff are reprising their roles. The third season is a split-cour series, with the first half airing from July 4 to September 26, 2021. The second half premiered on October 2, 2022.

== Season 1 (2017–18) ==
No. overall	No. in season	Title (Note: All English titles are taken from Crunchyroll.)	Original release date
1	1	"Shaking Your Heart"	December 31, 2017
Tsumugi starts her first day at her father Otoharu's company, Takanashi Productions, and is assigned to manage their upcoming boy group. After meeting seven trainees, she is asked to cut four of them from the group. However, Tsumugi convinces Otoharu that all seven members have necessary talents for the group.
2	2	"First Stage"; Transliteration: "Hajimari no Sutēji" (Japanese: はじまりのステージ)	December 31, 2017
The group, now named Idolish7, prepare for their first live performance and help Tsumugi promote by passing out flyers downtown. However, only nine show up at the venue. Despite this, the members of Idolish7 tell Tsumugi that while they had anticipated this outcome, they are more motivated to improve and deliver a powerful performance for their fans.
3	3	"Their Feelings"; Transliteration: "Sorezore no Kimochi" (Japanese: それぞれの気持ち)	January 7, 2018
The members of Idolish7 move into their dormitories to prepare for their debut. Tsumugi chooses Riku to be the center of Idolish7, and the group continues to do street performances. However, several of the members show a lack of motivation in taking their image seriously, leading Iori to suggest to Tsumugi to put them on a practice ban and get tickets for Trigger's concert to observe how they conduct themselves.
4	4	"A Pro's Resolve"; Transliteration: "Puro no Kakugo" (Japanese: プロの覚悟)	January 14, 2018
On the day of Trigger's concert, Yamato, Nagi, and Tamaki run late and run into Tenn, who has escaped the hospital in order to perform at the concert. The three carry him over to the concert venue. As the concert begins, Trigger leads a successful performance, while Riku reveals to the others that he and Tenn are twin brothers. Amazed by Trigger's performance, Idolish7 begins dancing to one of their songs outside of the venue after the concert, attracting attention from other concert-goers.
5	5	"Secret"; Transliteration: "Himitsu" (Japanese: 秘密)	January 21, 2018
During practice, Iori discovers that Riku has asthma, which affects his ability to sing and dance for long periods of time, but Riku urges him to keep it a secret in fear of being forced to leave the group. After a promotional street performance in the rain, Riku collapses from an asthma attack, causing Iori to reveal his condition to everyone. Tsumugi and the other Idolish7 members reassure Riku that they support him. Tsumugi announces that Idolish7 will have another live performance, and the tickets immediately sell out.
6	6	"Triumphant Return In The Rain"; Transliteration: "Ame no Naka no Gaisen" (Japanese: 雨の中の凱旋)	January 28, 2018
Idolish7 prepare for their second live performance, which also includes television coverage from Live × Live. Heavy rainfall takes place in the middle of the performance, cutting off all electricity. However, while the members of Idolish7 wait for power to come back on, Tamaki amazes the crowd with a solo dance break, followed up by Sogo.
7	7	"Ray of Light"; Transliteration: "Hitosuji no Hikari" (Japanese: ひとすじの光)	February 4, 2018
Tamaki and Sogo become the most popular members of Idolish7 after the performance and receive offers to appear on television. Yaotome attempts to poach them for his company; Tamaki accepts while Sogo declines, which causes tension between the two, as well as the other members of Idolish7. When Tamaki reveals that he wants to appear on television for his estranged sister to find him, the rest of Idolish7 declare that they will try to improve so that they can get on television one day. Otoharu decides to debut Tamaki and Sogo as the unit Mezzo in the meantime.
8	8	"Please, Music"; Transliteration: "Purīzu, Myūjikku" (Japanese: プリーズ、ミュージック)	February 11, 2018
Idolish7 is set to perform for the first time on the live music television show, Music Festa, but their schedule is pushed forward after an artist cancels their appearance. Right before they are about to perform, a music producer from Yaotome Productions ransacks Idolish7's dressing room to steal files for their debut single and breaks Riku's inhaler in the process. While keeping an eye out for Riku, Iori forgets to sing. After their disastrous performance, the members of Idolish7 and Tsumugi find Iori and comfort him, promising they will do better next time.
9	9	"Precious Time"; Transliteration: "Taisetsu na Jikan" (Japanese: 大切な時間)	February 18, 2018
The members of Idolish7 are sent on a camping trip for team-building.
10	10	"Expanding World"; Transliteration: "Hirogaru Sekai" (Japanese: 広がる世界)	February 25, 2018
As Tamaki and Sogo debut as Mezzo, the rest of the Idolish7 members promote themselves through their own online streaming show, Idolish7 Night With You. Yamato is offered a lead acting role in a primetime drama, but he declines. However, Mitsuki inspires him to accept the role.
11	11	"The Direction of Summer"; Transliteration: "Natsu no Yukue" (Japanese: 夏のゆくえ)	March 4, 2018
The members of Idolish7 prepare for their debut by filming their music video in Okinawa. Tamaki and Sogo, who are simultaneously filming a variety show in the same location, are approached by a video producer who offers a spot for Tamaki to help him find his sister. Despite Sogo's warnings, Tamaki accepts anyway. When they return, Takanashi Productions has been ransacked and the demo CD for their debut song, "Natsu Shiyouze!", has been stolen. The members of Idolish7 are able to record the song anyway, and when they are about to unveil the song during their live performance, they discover they share the same song as Trigger's next single.
12	12	"Five and Two"; Transliteration: "Go-nin to Futari" (Japanese: 5人と2人)	March 11, 2018
Idolish7 is unable to release "Natsu Shiyouze!" as a result of Trigger releasing it first, while Nagi reveals that the song was written by his friend, Haruki Sakura, the songwriter for the legendary idol singer, Zero. As Mezzo and Yamato get more job offers, Idolish7 is offered their own variety television show, but the deal falls through due to sponsors backing out. In addition, Tamaki becomes late for Mezzo's television shoot, upsetting Sogo. Sogo later collapses from stress.
13	13	"What Was Lost"; Transliteration: "Ushinawareta Mono" (Japanese: 失われたもの)	March 18, 2018
As Sogo recovers, he reveals that his estranged father is the chairman of FSC, a prominent production company, and that his father had caused Idolish7's show to become cancelled due to opposing Sogo's music career. Sogo contemplates leaving Idolish7 and Mezzo as he feels he is hindering their careers, but Tsumugi and the other members of Idolish7 encourage him to stay. Within the next few days, Idolish7 gains more job offers, including an appearance at Sound Ship, an acting role for Yamato, Nagi entering modeling, and Idolish7 becoming regulars on Mr. Shimooka's variety show.
14	14	"That Song Once Again"; Transliteration: "Ano Uta o Mō Ichido" (Japanese: あの歌をもう一度)	March 25, 2018
Idolish7 performs at Sound Ship, but Trigger is forced to withdraw after Yaotome gets into an argument with the show's staff. Despite the cold reception from Trigger fans, Idolish7 sings "Natsu Shiyouze!" in their place and win over the crowd. Under pressure, Yaotome Productions' music producer breaks into Takanashi Productions again, but he is caught and apprehended. Though Takanashi Productions decides not to file a police report in order to protect the members of Trigger, Otoharu personally confronts Yaotome.
15	15	"Closing Doors"; Transliteration: "Tojirareru Tobira" (Japanese: 閉じられる扉)	April 1, 2018
Gaku learns that "Natsu Shiyouze!" was originally Idolish7's song, causing the other members of Trigger to become disappointed. Furious at Takanashi, Yaotome influences several tabloid magazines to run gossip articles about the members of Idolish7. This causes in-fighting within Idolish7, as they begin to doubt themselves and each other. Tension becomes explosive when Tamaki is reunited with his estranged father instead of his sister on Mr. Shimooka's show, causing the filming to become cancelled. While Tsumugi notifies Idolish7 that they have been nominated for an award at the Japan Idol Music Awards, none of the members are excited. Otoharu announces that Idolish7 will disband, as they are no longer expressing interest in continuing as a group.
16	16	"Resolve At Zero"; Transliteration: "Zero Chiten no Ketsui" (Japanese: ゼロ地点の決意)	May 19, 2018
The members of Idolish7, along with Trigger, recount why they became idols and resolve to perform once more. Idolish7 performs at the Japan Idol Music Awards and win Best New Artist.
17	17	"Making the Dream"	May 19, 2018

== Season 2: Second Beat! (2020) ==
No. overall	No. in season	Title	Original release date
18	1	"A New Door"; Transliteration: "Atarashī Tobira" (Japanese: 新しい扉)	April 5, 2020
19	2	"Wavering Feelings"; Transliteration: "Yureru Kimochi" (Japanese: 揺れる気持ち)	April 5, 2020
20	3	"The Proposal"; Transliteration: "Teian" (Japanese: 提案)	April 12, 2020
21	4	"A New Form"; Transliteration: "Aratana Katachi" (Japanese: あらたなかたち)	April 19, 2020
22	5	"The Sudden Visitor"; Transliteration: "Totsuzen no Hōmonsha" (Japanese: 突然の訪問者)	October 18, 2020
23	6	"Voice"; Transliteration: "Koe" (Japanese: 声)	October 25, 2020
24	7	"Discord Bleeding Through"; Transliteration: "Nijimu Fukyōwa" (Japanese: 滲む不協和)	November 1, 2020
25	8	"I Want You to Know!"; Transliteration: "Tsutaetai ndesu!" (Japanese: 伝えたいんです！)	November 8, 2020
26	9	"Something Important"; Transliteration: "Taisetsuna Mono" (Japanese: 大切なもの)	November 15, 2020
27	10	"Out of Time"; Transliteration: "Kigengire" (Japanese: 期限切れ)	November 22, 2020
28	11	"The Place I Want to Protect"; Transliteration: "Mamoritai Basho" (Japanese: 守りたい場所)	November 29, 2020
29	12	"Ripples"; Transliteration: "Hamon" (Japanese: 波紋)	December 6, 2020
30	13	"Lies and Formality"; Transliteration: "Uso to Gishiki" (Japanese: 嘘と儀式)	December 13, 2020
31	14	"Trigger"; Transliteration: "Hikigane" (Japanese: 引き金)	December 20, 2020
32	15	"Discover the Future"	December 27, 2020

== Season 3: Third Beat! (2021–23) ==
No. overall	No. in season	Title	Original release date
33	1	"Clouds Covering the Stars"; Transliteration: "Hoshi o Ōu Kumo" (Japanese: 星を覆う雲)	July 4, 2021
34	2	"Unknown Scars"; Transliteration: "Shiranai Kizu" (Japanese: 知らない傷)	July 11, 2021
35	3	"Rifts"; Transliteration: "Kiretsu" (Japanese: 亀裂)	July 18, 2021
36	4	"The Voice of Heart"; Transliteration: "Kokoro no Koe" (Japanese: 心の声)	July 25, 2021
37	5	"Where We Belong"; Transliteration: "Ibasho" (Japanese: 居場所)	August 1, 2021
38	6	"Feelings to Reach"; Transliteration: "Todokeru Omoi" (Japanese: 届ける想い)	August 8, 2021
39	7	"Contact"; Transliteration: "Sesshoku" (Japanese: 接触)	August 15, 2021
40	8	"Our Incomplete Selves"; Transliteration: "Mikansei na Bokura" (Japanese: 未完成な僕ら)	August 22, 2021
41	9	"Re:vale"	August 29, 2021
42	10	"The Training Camp!"; Transliteration: "Gasshuku Kaishi!" (Japanese: 合宿開始！)	September 5, 2021
43	11	"Meticulous Malice"; Transliteration: "Shūtō na Akui" (Japanese: 周到な悪意)	September 12, 2021
44	12	"Preparing to Take Over"; Transliteration: "Sandatsu no Junbi" (Japanese: 簒奪の準備)	September 19, 2021
45	13	"Tetrarchy of Madness and Destruction"; Transliteration: "Kyōki to Hakai no Tetorarukia" (Japanese: 狂気と破壊のテトラルキア)	September 26, 2021
46	14	"Threat"; Transliteration: "Kyōi" (Japanese: 脅威)	October 2, 2022
47	15	"Indestructible Soul"; Transliteration: "Fumetsu no Tamashī" (Japanese: 不滅の魂)	October 9, 2022
48	16	"The Angel and the Monster"; Transliteration: "Tenshi to Monsutā" (Japanese: 天使とモンスター)	October 16, 2022
49	17	"Comeback Play"; Transliteration: "Gyakuten no Itte" (Japanese: 逆転の一手)	October 23, 2022
50	18	"Dear Butterfly"	October 30, 2022
51	19	"The Trio's Resolve"; Transliteration: "3-Nin no Ketsui" (Japanese: 3人の決意)	November 6, 2022
52	20	"Together We'll Dream a Neverending Dream"; Transliteration: "Samenai Yume o Issho ni" (Japanese: 醒めない夢を一緒に)	November 13, 2022
53	21	"Bonds and Promises"; Transliteration: "Kizuna to Yakusoku" (Japanese: 絆と約束)	November 20, 2022
54	22	"Anytime, Anywhere"	November 27, 2022
55	23	"The Resolve to Keep Singing"; Transliteration: "Utai Tsudzukeru Kakugo" (Japanese: 歌い続ける覚悟)	December 4, 2022
56	24	"Begin the Counterattack"; Transliteration: "Hangeki Kaishi" (Japanese: 反撃開始)	December 11, 2022
57	25	"Behind-the-Scenes Meeting"; Transliteration: "Ura Mītingu" (Japanese: 裏ミーティング)	December 18, 2022
58	26	"Friends Day!"	December 25, 2022
59	27	"Attractive Force"; Transliteration: "Inryoku" (Japanese: 引力)	February 5, 2023
60	28	"Changing Scenery"; Transliteration: "Kawaru Keshiki" (Japanese: 変わる景色)	February 12, 2023
61	29	"Stir and Spill Over"; Transliteration: "Kakimaze Kobore Yuku" (Japanese: 掻き混ぜ零れゆく)	February 19, 2023
62	30	"Bound Fates"; Transliteration: "Musuba Reru Inga" (Japanese: 結ばれる因果)	February 26, 2023

== Idolish7: Vibrato (2018–19) ==
Apart from the anime television series, there are spin-off series based on the stories from manga and novels adaptations. The series of anime shorts, titled Idolish7: Vibrato, is currently being streamed exclusively on Bandai Visual's official YouTube channel as a YouTube Original, with the "first part" of the shorts focused on Trigger. The first episode aired on February 16, 2018. The second to eighth episodes ran from January 17, 2019, to March 7, 2019.

No.	Title	Original air date
1	"Trigger: Before the Radiant Glory (Part 1)"	February 16, 2018
2	"Trigger: Before the Radiant Glory (Part 2)"	January 17, 2019
3	"Boys Caught Up (Part 1)"; Transliteration: "Makikomareta Otoko (Part 1)" (Japanese: 巻き込まれた男)	January 17, 2019
4	"Boys Caught Up (Part 2)"; Transliteration: "Makikomareta Otoko (Part 2)" (Japanese: 巻き込まれた男)	January 27, 2019
5	"Party Time Together(Part 1)"	February 7, 2019
6	"Party Time Together (Part 2)"	February 17, 2019
7	"Let's Do Summer! (Part 1)"; Transliteration: "Natsu Shiyō ze! (Part 1)" (Japanese: 夏しようぜ！)	February 27, 2019
8	"Let's Do Summer! (Part 2)"; Transliteration: "Natsu Shiyō ze! (Part 2)" (Japanese: 夏しようぜ！)	March 7, 2019
