= The Too-Perfect Saint =

Japanese light novel series and its adaptations

- The Too-Perfect Saint: Tossed Aside by My Fiancé and Sold to Another Kingdom
- First light novel volume cover

完璧すぎて可愛げがないと婚約破棄された聖女は隣国に売られる (Kanpeki Sugite Kawaige ga Nai to Konyaku Haki Sareta Seijo wa Ringoku ni Urareru)
- Genre: Fantasy; Romantic comedy
- Novel series
- Written by: Kōki Fuyutsuki
- Published by: Shōsetsuka ni Narō
- Original run: July 18, 2020 – January 19, 2022
- Light novel
- Written by: Kōki Fuyutsuki
- Illustrated by: Masami
- Published by: Overlap
- English publisher: NA: Seven Seas Entertainment
- Imprint: Overlap Novels f
- Original run: April 25, 2021 – present
- Volumes: 9
- Manga
- Written by: Kōki Fuyutsuki
- Illustrated by: Mago Ayakita
- Published by: Overlap
- English publisher: NA: Seven Seas Entertainment
- Imprint: Gardo Comics
- Magazine: Comic Gardo
- Original run: November 5, 2021 – present
- Volumes: 8
- Anime television series
- Directed by: Shuu Watanabe
- Written by: Keiichirō Ōchi
- Music by: Takaaki Nakahashi
- Studio: Troyca
- Licensed by: Crunchyroll; SEA: Plus Media Networks Asia
- Original network: TV Tokyo, TVA, BS Asahi, AT-X
- Original run: April 10, 2025 – June 26, 2025
- Episodes: 12
- icon

The Too-Perfect Saint: Tossed Aside by My Fiancé and Sold to Another Kingdom (Japanese: 完璧すぎて可愛げがないと婚約破棄された聖女は隣国に売られる, Hepburn: Kanpeki Sugite Kawaige ga Nai to Konyaku Haki Sareta Seijo wa Ringoku ni Urareru), often abbreviated as Perfect Saint (完璧聖女, Kanpeki Seijo), is a Japanese light novel series written by Kōki Fuyutsuki and illustrated by Masami. It was serialized on the user-generated novel publishing website Shōsetsuka ni Narō from July 2020 to January 2022. It was later acquired by Overlap who began publishing it under their Overlap Novels f imprint in April 2021. A manga adaptation illustrated by Mago Ayakita began serialization on Overlap's Comic Gardo manga service in November 2021. An anime television series adaptation produced by Troyca aired from April to June 2025.

== Premise ==
Philia is the Saint of her kingdom Ziltonia and engaged to the second prince, Julius Ziltonia. However, Julius sold her to the neighboring kingdom of Parnacorta, which lost their own Saint recently. To her shock, Philia finds she has been overworking herself and that a saint truly doesn't need to take care of all of the kingdom's problems unless consulted. Meanwhile, Philia's younger sister plots revenge against Julius for selling off her sister.

Back in Ziltonia, the country has started falling apart as no one has actually needed to do their jobs properly as Philia was doing too much. Doom is creeping closer for them.

== Characters ==
Philia Adenauer (フィリア・アデナウアー, Firia Adenauā)
Voiced by: Yui Ishikawa
A ridiculously competent Saint who pretty much ran Ziltonia by covering for all the issues. Having never been given emotional support by her parents, Philia is stoic but compassionate. Always working too hard, Philia never had time for hobbies nor preference; she just ate and slept robotically.
After turning herself into the core of a barrier to repel demons, Philia spends her time training the next Saint of Parnacorta.
Mia Adenauer (ミア・アデナウアー, Mia Adenauā)
Voiced by: Kaede Hondo
Younger sister of Philia and less experienced Saint. She worships her sister and loathes Julius along with her parents for how poorly they have treated Philia. To get revenge on them, Mia fakes accepting his marriage proposal; part of her plan to force the first prince into taking the throne. It is later revealed that she and Philia are really cousins, though they still acknowledge each other as sisters.
She experiences the pathetic side of Julius when he cowers while accompanying her on an excursion that results in demons attacking.
Osvalt Parnacorta (オスヴァルト・パルナコルタ, Osuvaruto Parunakoruta)
Voiced by: Takuya Satō
Second prince with a hobby of farming. He tries to befriend Philia and help her open up; seeing she needs to experience what it actually means to live her life. In fact, he actually has a crush on her.
Julius Girtonia (ユリウス・ジルトニア, Yuriusu Jirutonia)
Voiced by: Kōhei Amasaki
The second prince. Simply put, he is a selfish, petty, manchild; not even being aware that Philia did most of the work for the entirety of the kingdom and that Mia is inadequate to properly replace her.
He sold off Philia because her medicine was healing his father; wishing for him and his brother to die, so he can rule unopposed. Just a short time after Philia is gone, the kingdom begins falling apart; he has no clue how to run it.
Reichardt Parnacorta (ライハルト・パルナコルタ, Raiharuto Parunakoruta)
Voiced by: Shinnosuke Tachibana
First prince and fiancé of the deceased Saint of Parnacorta. He visits her grave regularly.
Lena (リーナ, Rīna)
Voiced by: Sora Tokui
Maid assigned to Philia in Parnacorta. She has combat experience with knives. Lina lends Philia books to help her learn how to interact with other people.
Leonardo (レオナルド, Reonarudo)
Voiced by: Ken Narita
Butler assigned to Philia in Parnacorta. Much like Lina, he is shocked that his mistress has no concept of proper rest and overworked herself before moving to Parnacorta. He is skilled with hand to hand combat.
Himari (ヒマリ)
Voiced by: Kanna Nakamura
Another servant assigned to Philia. Himari is a ninja with excellent stealth skills. Philia asked her to look after Mia; resulting in Himari helping Mia with her revenge plans.
Grace Martilas (グレイス・マーティラス, Gureisu Mātirasu)
Voiced by: Shu Uchida
The youngest of the Martilas sisters and a saint-in-training who studies under the tutelage of Philia. She looks up to Philia and gets along very well with her.
Fernand Girtonia (フェルナンド・ジルトニア, Ferunando Jirutonia)
Voiced by: Kazuyuki Okitsu
Crown prince of the Girtonia kingdom and Julius's older brother. Fernand is born with a frail constitution and suffers from a long term illness. He is imprisoned by Julius so that the latter can take the throne for himself. Through the help of Mia, he is eventually freed, cured and helped stop Julius from usurping the throne.
Hildegard Adenauer (ヒルデガルト・アデナウアー, Hirudegaruto Adenauā)
Voiced by: Miki Itō
Sister of Georg and the previous saint before Philia. In truth, she is Philia's birth mother; however, Georg kidnapped Philia when he and Cornelia were having trouble producing an heir. Georg slandered Hildegard to discredit her claims of parentage.
Once she gets wind of Mia's plans for revenge against her parents and the second prince, Hildegard gets the paperwork ready to adopt Mia; knowing her brother's house will be destroyed in every sense once his dirty dealings come to light.
Georg Adenauer (ゲオルグ・アデナウアー, Georugu Adenauā)
Voiced by: Kentarō Itō
A terrible man who burns with a jealousy towards his more competent sister. He is Cornelia's husband, Mia's father, and Philia's adoptive father/uncle. When he and his wife were having trouble conceiving, he had the "brilliant" idea to kidnap his newborn niece and pass her off as his own. Once he finally succeeded in siring an heir himself, he largely ignored and verbally abused Philia her entire life.
Cornelia Adenauer (コルネリア・アデナウアー, Koruneria Adenauā)
Voiced by: Sayaka Ohara
A woman obsessed spending on extravagant things. She is Georg's wife, Mia's mother, and Philia's adoptive mother/aunt.
Pierre (ピエール, Piēru)
Voiced by: Yuya Murakami
The captain of the guards who is loyal to the Crown prince Fernand. His unit is subsequently assigned to protect and support Mia on her monster subduction trips.
Erza Nautilus (エルザ・ノーティス, Eruza Nōtisu)
Voiced by: Ikue Ōtani
An exorcist who serves the Church of Cremoux. She fights with a sword.
Mammon (マモン)
Voiced by: Kenn
Ezra's demon familiar. He can transform into a large white wolf.
Emily Mattilas (エミリー・マーティラス, Emirī Mātirasu)
Voiced by: Natsumi Murakami
The oldest of the Mattilas sisters. She has a proud personality and sees Philia as her biggest competitor as the latter is known as “The Greatest Saint”. While she refuses to acknowledge it, it was later shown that she is aware that Philia is way more knowledgeable than herself.
Amanda Mattilas (アマンダ・マーティラス, Amanda Mātirasu)
Voiced by: Aina Suzuki
Second of the Mattilas sisters. Very supportive of Grace and able to manage Emily.
Jane Mattilas (ジェーン・マーティラス, Jēn Mātirasu)
Voiced by: Nanaka Suwa
Third of the Mattilas sisters. Like Amanda, very supportive of Grace and able to manage Emily.
Asmodeus (アスモデウス, Asumodeusu)
Voiced by: Hiroki Tōchi
The main antagonist. He is a powerful demon who seeks to destroy the world and obsessed with Fiana who he is one-sided in love with.
Fiana Isphil (フィアナ・イースフィル, Fiana Īsufiru)
Voiced by: Maaya Sakamoto
Philia's original incarnation. The legendary saint who saved the world four hundred years ago from potential destruction brought about by Asmodeus by sealing the latter with an incomplete seal.
Bjorn
The bishop of Parnacorta.
Elizabeth
Parnacorta original Saint, who died prior to the events of the story. She is revealed to be Grace's cousin and the fiancée of Reichardt.
Marquis Pyrz
A count who is in Julius’ camp and an accomplice to Mia's parents in their plans.
Eigelstein
Osvalt and Reichardt's father and the ruler of Parnacorta.

== Media ==
=== Light novel ===
Written by Kōki Fuyutsuki, The Too-Perfect Saint: Tossed Aside by My Fiancé and Sold to Another Kingdom was serialized on the user-generated novel publishing website Shōsetsuka ni Narō from July 18, 2020, to January 19, 2022. It was later acquired by Overlap who began releasing it with illustrations by Masami under their Overlap Novels f light novel imprint on April 25, 2021. Nine volumes have been released as of August 2026. The series is licensed in North America by Seven Seas Entertainment.

No.	Original release date	Original ISBN	North American release date	North American ISBN
1	April 25, 2021	978-4-86554-893-8	January 9, 2025 (digital); February 4, 2025 (print)	979-8-89160-871-9
Prologue; Chapter 1: "The Saint of Parnacorta"; Chapter 2: "The Danger Encroaching Her Homeland"; Chapter 3: "The Sisters Make Their Move"; Chapter 4: "Endings and Beginnings"; Epilogue; Side Story: "The Saint Sisters' First Day on the Job"
2	August 25, 2021	978-4-86554-986-7	April 10, 2025 (digital); May 6, 2025 (print)	979-8-89160-946-4
Prologue; Chapter 1: "The Mysterious Vanishing Incidents"; Chapter 2: "The Saints' Summit Begins"; Chapter 3: "Asmodeus's Realm"; Chapter 4: "Love is Woven by the Ties That Bind"; Epilogue; Side Story: "A Tiny Moment of Kindness"
3	January 25, 2022	978-4-8240-0091-0	July 3, 2025 (digital); August 5, 2025 (print)	979-8-89373-383-9
Prologue; Chapter 1: "A New Pope"; Chapter 2: "To the Kingdom of Dalbert"; Chapter 3: "The Dead Man's Words"; Chapter 4: "A Vow of Love in a Foreign Land"; Epilogue; Side Story: "The Saint and the Prince of Girtonia"; Side Story: "The Wedding Dress"
4	March 25, 2023	978-4-8240-0448-2	September 25, 2025 (digital); November 4, 2025 (print)	979-8-89373-384-6
Prologue; Chapter 1: "The Triumphant Return of the Sold Saint"; Chapter 2: "Philia's Roots"; Chapter 3: "My Father's Wishes"; Chapter 4: "A Cure for the Incurable Illness"; Chapter 5: "Love in My Hands"; Epilogue
5	November 25, 2023	978-4-8240-0637-0	February 12, 2026 (digital); March 3, 2026 (print)	979-8-89373-385-3
Prologue; Chapter 1: "Royal Meeting Number Two"; Chapter 2: "The Honeymoon"; Chapter 3: "The Break-In at the Ruins"; Chapter 4: "The Money Worshipper's Reasoning"; Chapter 5: "More than Money and Devotion"; Epilogue; Bonus Story: "The First Prince's Fiancée"; Bonus Story: "The Crown Prince and the Merchant"
6	June 25, 2024	978-4-8240-0862-6	May 21, 2026 (digital); July 7, 2026 (print)	979-8-89373-775-2
Prologue; Chapter 1: "The Knights at the Border"; Chapter 2: "A Fixed Path"; Chapter 3: "The King of Alectron"; Chapter 4: "Another Attack"; Chapter 5: "Your Smile is a Ray of Hope"; Epilogue; Bonus Story: "A Letter from My Big Sister"
7	December 25, 2024	978-4-8240-1034-6	October 8, 2026 (digital); November 10, 2026 (print)	979-8-89561-584-3
8	March 25, 2025	978-4-8240-1124-4	March 9, 2027 (print)	979-8-89765-656-1
9	August 20, 2026	978-4-8240-1804-5	—	—

=== Manga ===
A manga adaptation illustrated by Mago Ayakita began serialization on Overlap's Comic Gardo manga service on November 5, 2021. The manga's chapters have been collected into eight tankōbon volumes as of May 2026. The manga adaptation is also licensed in North America by Seven Seas Entertainment.

No.	Original release date	Original ISBN	North American release date	North American ISBN
1	February 25, 2022	978-4-8240-0122-1	February 11, 2025	979-8-89160-875-7
1. "The Saint Who Doesn't Smile"; 2. "Homeland Farewell"; 3. "Welcome to Parnacorta"; 4. "The Saint's Duties"; 5. "First Date"; Bonus Short Story: "Two Princes"
2	September 25, 2022	978-4-8240-0303-4	May 13, 2025	979-8-89160-953-2
6. "Emergency Conference"; 7. "Great Purification Circle"; 8. "Entrusted Thoughts"; 9. "Lessons in Ancient Magic"; 10. "Cold World"; Bonus Short Story: "The Saint of Bolmern"
3	March 25, 2023	978-4-8240-0456-7	August 19, 2025	979-8-89373-366-2
11. "The Extended Hand"; 12. "Yellow Freesias"; 13. "Family"; 14. "Dark Clouds Gather"; 15. "How a Saint Should Be"; Bonus Short Story: "First Duty"
4	November 25, 2023	978-4-8240-0646-2	November 11, 2025	979-8-89373-367-9
16. "The Locked-Up Prince"; 17. "Reason and Emotion"; 18. "Secret Stratagem"; 19. "With You Who Gave Me Courage"; 20. "Older Sister and Younger Sister"
5	June 25, 2024	978-4-8240-0875-6	February 17, 2026	979-8-89373-776-9
21. "Fate's Diverging Paths"; 22. "Judgments"; 23. "The Thing She Wishes to Protect"; 24. "The Battle Between Hope and Despair"
6	March 25, 2025	978-4-8240-1137-4	May 19, 2026	979-8-89765-124-5
25. "A World Without You in It"; 26. "I Wanted to See You Again"; 27. "A Place of Peace"; 28. "Thoughts Offered Up to a Saint"; 29. "The Coming of Changes and Ripples"
7	July 25, 2025	978-4-8240-1282-1	August 18, 2026	979-8-89765-947-0
8	May 8, 2026	978-4-8240-1627-0	December 22, 2026	979-8-89863-258-8

=== Anime ===
An anime television series adaptation was announced during the "5th Overlap Bunko All-Star Roundup Special" livestream on October 20, 2024. It is produced by Troyca and directed by Shū Watanabe, with scripts written by Keiichirō Ōchi, characters designed by Shūhei Yamamoto, and music composed by Takaaki Nakahashi. The series aired from April 10 to June 26, 2025, on TV Tokyo and other networks. (Note: TV Tokyo lists the series premiere on April 9, 2025, at 24:00, which is effectively April 10 at midnight JST.) The opening theme song is "Ai toka." (愛とか。; Something Like Love.), performed by Riria, while the ending theme song is "Sister", performed by Won. Crunchyroll streamed the series. Plus Media Networks Asia licensed the series in Southeast Asia and broadcasts it on Aniplus Asia.

==== Episodes ====
No.	Title	Directed by	Written by	Storyboarded by	Original release date (Note: Episodes are released on ABEMA, U-NEXT, Anime Hōdai, Crunchyroll and simulcast platforms by Plus Media Networks Asia a week before their televised airings.)
1	"The Saint Who Never Smiled"; Transliteration: "Warawanai Seijo" (Japanese: 笑わない聖女)	Jun Takahashi	Keiichirō Ōchi	Shū Watanabe & Suizokuen Asagaya	April 10, 2025
In a world infested by monsters, humanity's only salvation are Saints, women who wield holy magic to drive the monsters out and purify the land. The greatest living Saint, Philia Adenauer, lives in Girtonia Kingdom and serves its people well. Unfortunately, she is incapable of smiling, which makes people uncomfortable. Girtonia's second Saint is Mia, Philia's little sister, who possesses such a sweet smile; she is beloved by the whole kingdom. In private, Philia is miserable. Her power has attracted powerful enemies, who resent her success. She also lives with her hyper-critical parents, who openly prefer Mia. For several years, Philia has been engaged to Prince Julius, an arrogant, selfish man. Philia and Mia are very close and adore spending time together. Julius conspires with her parents to end their engagement in favor of marrying Mia. Julius also secretly sells Philia to the Parnacorta Kingdom, whose Saint recently died. Overcome by grief but unable to argue, Philia departs without being allowed to say goodbye to Mia. Julius begins plotting to seize Girtonia's throne once his ill father dies. After a long journey, Philia is abandoned at the border and told that she must walk the rest of the way. To her surprise, rather than the life of slavery she was expecting, she is given a royal welcome by Parnacorta's prince.
2	"Welcome to Parnacorta"; Transliteration: "Yōkoso Parunakoruta e" (Japanese: ようこそパルナコルタへ)	Michita Shiraishi	Keiichirō Ōchi	Tetsuo Hirakawa	April 17, 2025
In the capital city of Almburg, the bishop Bjorn welcomes Philia with a party. Second Prince Osvalt apologizes for buying her, but Parnacorta was desperate after the death of Saint Elizabeth, and swears to make Philia so happy she falls in love with Parnacorta. First Prince Reichardt is also glad to see her, though Philia is certain they are eager to put her to work. Philia is confused to receive a mansion with butler Leonardo and maid Lena. Philia learns monster attacks have increased since Elizabeth's death, so she wakes up early as normal, surprising Leonardo and Lena, and drives out a monster nest in the mountains. Lena and Leonardo accompany her to protect her, though Philia is certain they are judging her usefulness. In reality, they are amazed at how much work Philia does in a single day. Philia is confused, since her mother and Julius always told her constant hard work was her duty. Lena and Leonardo conclude Philia has been mistreated badly in Girtonia, since in every other kingdom Saints are afforded the same respect as nobility. Parnacorta's citizens are soon praising Philia's name as monsters disappear and merchants start trading again. Mia is devastated by Philia's absence and swears to discover who is responsible since her father lied to her about Philia's decision about leaving the country. Julius discovers Philia had been solely responsible for exterminating all the monsters, and without her, his soldiers are unable to stop them attacking everywhere.
3	"Our First Date"; Transliteration: "Hajimete no Dēto" (Japanese: 初めてのデート)	Tomio Yamauchi	Takayo Ikami	Suizokuen Asagaya	April 24, 2025
Osvalt takes Philia on a tour of Almburg and Philia feels her heart racing. Philia is confused that Osvalt asked her personal questions, since she never had time to develop personal interests. Her research leads her to believe that the Demon Realm is approaching the surface. This happened 400 years ago when the demon Asmodeus invaded. Had it not been for Arch-Saint Fianna Aesfill defeating him, Asmodeus would have destroyed the world. Philia fears being ridiculed for suggesting such a thing without evidence, so she is surprised when Osvalt authorizes extra funds to the military. She suggests casting a Great Purification Circle over Parnacorta, which would weaken monsters instead of keeping them out, allowing the military to kill them. The drawback is that Philia would have to stay in Almburg at the circle's center, leaving her unable to work. Once again, she is surprised when Osvalt agrees to this, claiming she needs time to relax anyway. Philia worries about Mia protecting Girtonia on her own, so she sends a letter with helpful advice. Meanwhile, Mia is disgusted when Julius proposes to her and realizes he must have conspired with her parents. She delays answering his proposal, planning to manipulate him into admitting his guilt. Her parents intercept the letter from Philia and burn it without reading it. Mia finds evidence of her parents sudden increase in wealth and eventually confirms that Julius sold Philia to another kingdom. With his guilt confirmed, Mia accepts Julius' proposal, planning to plunge him into the depths of absolute despair.
4	"Feelings Entrusted"; Transliteration: "Takusu Omoi" (Japanese: 託す想い)	Masashi Abe	Sayaka Harada	Masashi Abe	May 1, 2025
Mia considers sending a letter to Philia, worried that she is being mistreated in Parnacorta. Meanwhile, Philia casts the Great Purification Circle, amazing the citizens. With the circle complete, Philia hears a sinister voice in her head. Later, Philia continues to work making medicines while stuck maintaining the circle. Lena realizes that Philia doesn't have a hobby and introduces her to romance novels, which for some reason cause Philia to think about Osvalt. Osvalt later visits and explains that before she arrived, he and Reichardt had a nasty argument, since Osvalt was against buying her for money. He then abruptly asks if Philia is interested in becoming a tutor. Several days later, Mia's letter arrives and Philia deduces that Mia did not receive the letter she sent, presumably destroyed by their parents. Leonardo summons Himari, a ninja guarding Philia in secret. Himari promises to deliver Philia's letters directly to Mia. In Girtonia, as Mia struggles to defeat monsters on her own, Himari easily separates Mia from her incompetent guards and passes her Philia's letter. Mia is overjoyed Philia is well loved in Parnacorta, but troubled by her letter. Mia knows that she doesn't possess the skills to cast her own Great Purification Circle, and turning Girtonia's army into an effective fighting force will be impossible with Julius in charge. Himari offers to kidnap her to Parnacorta to be with Philia. Mia is tempted, reasoning that Girtonia kingdom deserves to be abandoned after what everyone did to Philia.
5	"Golden Freesia"; Transliteration: "Kiiro no Furījia" (Japanese: 黄色のフリージア)	Takuma Suzuki	Keiichirō Ōchi	Hikaru Takeuchi & Koji Yoshikawa	May 8, 2025
Philia becomes tutor to Grace Mattilas, the inexperienced Saint of Bolmern Kingdom, and begins teaching her the Great Purification Circle, which requires fluency in the ancient language and the ability to perceive the mana found in nature. Grace reveals that she has a book Philia wrote on Sainthood, surprising her since her mother and Julius had most of the copies burned. Philia tries to emulate her own instructor Hildegard, her paternal aunt and Girtonia's previous Saint. Remembering her harsh training, Philia realizes that Hildegard deliberately made her mentally resilient to survive Julius and her parents, whom Hildegard despised. Philia begins reading Lena's romance novels, but struggles to understand them. Grace asks to visit Elizabeth's grave, as they were cousins and fond of each other. There, they encounter Reichardt, who visits the grave regularly as he had a past relationship with Elizabeth. Philia struggles to understand such a deep love when she has never once bothered trying to fall in love with another person. Osvalt admits to Philia that he has no interest in becoming king, so he took up gardening so no one would take him seriously as potential heir. It also makes him happy giving away what he grows to people that need it. Philia realizes that she also enjoys making people happy. Reichardt receives a letter from Julius demanding Philia be returned to Girtonia.
6	"Reason and Emotion"; Transliteration: "Risei to Kanjō" (Japanese: 理性と感情)	Jun Takahashi & Minori Mizuno	Takayo Ikami	Suizokuen Asagaya	May 15, 2025
Mia, who refused to escape with Himari, advises Julius on strategies, but is ignored. Julius' sick father, the King, is so enraged by his son's arrogance that he leaves his sick bed to yell at Julius, but falls ill again. Mia deduces that Julius sold Philia specifically to stop her from tending to the King so he will die sooner and Julius can become king. Taking advantage of his ego, Mia invites Julius on one of her patrols and he naturally panics when monsters attack. With his cowardice exposed, he decides to demand Philia back from Parnacorta. Erza Nautilus, the Exorcist of the Cremoux Church, and her demon familiar Mammon investigates the weakening seal preventing Asmodeus' return. A demon possesses an unwitting Marquis Pyrz and reveals to Julius a ring containing Fianna's magic is hidden under the church and goads Julius into wanting it so he can surpass Philia. After receiving Julius's message, Osvalt refuses to return Philia, but offers to send knights to assist Mia. At Mia's request, Philia sends an improved medicine recipe via Himari, hoping it will cure the King permanently. Mia plans to save Girtonia as the Saint while getting her revenge by having Julius exposed for his crimes and exiled. To this end, she decides to arrange for Girtonia's political troubles to be handled by Fernand, Julius' older brother, who has spent months imprisoned in his room by Julius' guards.
7	"The Imprisoned Prince"; Transliteration: "Tozasareta Ōji" (Japanese: 閉ざされた王子)	Michita Shiraishi	Sayaka Harada	Hiroshi Mita	May 22, 2025 (Note: This episode aired at 12:41 a.m. JST, 41 minutes after the original air time on TV Tokyo.)
As many soldiers are loyal to Fernand over Julius, Mia is able to speak with Fernand with the help of the captain of her personal guard, Pierre. Pierre reveals that Fernand spent so long in isolation, he still has not left his room and has become ill. Mia finds that Fernand has resigned himself to being assassinated by Julius in the near future. Mia decides to save Fernand, she must first cure his illness, but Fernand refuses all medicine, since improving his health might cause Julius to assassinate him even sooner to avoid a succession dispute. Philia is invited to meet Osvalt's father, King Eigelstein, who is so grateful for her hard work he approves sending Parnacorta's knights to assist Mia, causing Philia an enormous sense of relief. She reveals she has come up with a plan that should save not only Parnacorta and Girtonia, but other nearby kingdoms as well. By borrowing magic from Grace and Grace's sisters, who are also Saint Candidates, Philia believes she could cast a Great Purification Circle over the entire continent. Mia continues to visit Fernand and points out that he is worse than a failure, since those who failed at least had the courage to try first, whereas Fernand only sits in his bed feeling sorry for himself. Realizing she is right, Fernand decides to finally do something, starting with getting out of bed.
8	"With You, Who Gave Me Courage"; Transliteration: "Yuuki o Kureta Anata to" (Japanese: 勇気をくれたあなたと)	Hayato Sakai	Keiichirō Ōchi	Hayato Sakai	May 29, 2025
Mia is thrilled when her aunt Hildegarde comes out of retirement to help her. A demon targets Philia, but is slain by Erza. She reveals to Philia that Asmodeus will be targeting her as the strongest saint. Fernand attends a meeting of the nobility and proves himself the superior politician, making Julius look incompetent. Julius loses his temper, declares Philia a traitor and orders the Adenauer family stripped of their wealth. Fernand reveals to Mia that he deliberately provoked Julius, who is certain to do something stupid. Mia's parents beg Julius for mercy, so he forces them to assist him. Grace convinces her sisters Emily, Jane, and Amanda to help Philia with the continent-sized circle. Emily is reluctant to, but is eventually convinced. On Julius' orders, Mia's parents host a lavish party for Girtonia's nobility. Marquis Pyrz's son betrays him and reveals important information to Mia. Hildegarde unexpectedly offers to adopt Mia, since her parents will be ruined when Julius is exposed. Mia is uncertain, but Hildegarde reveals the shocking truth; Philia is actually her biological daughter, thus Mia's cousin. Mia's parents stole her to hide the fact that they failed to conceive their own children. Eventually, they conceived Mia, but to preserve their reputations, they slandered Hildegarde's reputation so no one believed her when she claimed Philia was her child. Seeing her parents' true colors, Mia lets go of any remaining love she had for them and consents to the adoption.
9	"Crossroads of Fate"; Transliteration: "Unmei no Wakaremichi" (Japanese: 運命の分かれ道)	Masashi Abe	Takayo Ikami	Masashi Abe	June 5, 2025
Philia learns that Parnacorta's knights were refused entry to Girtonia by Julius. Philia calculates that Girtonia will fall in 4 days. Erza reveals that the Cremoux Church believes in the continual reincarnation of souls, and there is a possibility that Philia is the reincarnation of Saint Fiana. It is also a possibility that Asmodeus actually fell in love with Fiana and is planning to make Philia fall in love with him. Osvalt invites Philia to dinner, after the Asmodeus crisis is over. At Mia's parents' party, Fernand gives a speech that impresses the nobles, causing Julius to poison his wine, then prevents Mia from treating him. News arrives that the King has been assassinated and Julius arrogantly admits to everyone he planned it all to become king. Fernand recovers, revealing he knew what Julius was planning; Mia having been told about the plot by Marquis Pryz's son. The King is also alive; Julius' assassins having been killed by Himari. Julius is furious when the nobles reject him. Revealing herself to be the true mastermind behind the plot, Mia terminates their engagement and publicly denounces him and her parents for abusing and then selling Philia. Unwilling to see past his arrogance, Julius attempts to bribe everyone into blaming Mia for everything, but even Pryz turns away from him. The King, having witnessed everything disguised as a servant, reveals himself and confronts Julius personally.
10	"What I Wish to Protect"; Transliteration: "Mamoritai Mono" (Japanese: 守りたいもの)	Minori Mizuno	Keiichirō Ōchi	Masami Watanabe	June 12, 2025
The King reveals that Philia's improved medicine cured him permanently, so he arrests Julius, Mia's parents, and Pryz for treason. Parnacorta's knights are allowed into Girtonia. With Grace and her sisters, Philia casts the circle over Parnacorta and Bolmern, but due to the monsters already in Girtonia, the mana is disrupted, leaving Girtonia unprotected. Philia plans to travel to Girtonia, but is prevented by Reichardt since Philia is Parnacorta's Saint and cannot just rush off to another kingdom. Erza agrees as Girtonia is too close to where Asmodeus will appear. Osvalt stands up for Philia, as does Grace, who offers to keep powering the circle so it doesn't collapse when Philia leaves. In Girtonia, Mia rushes the monsters alone, which she had always planned to do, intending to commit suicide for her guilt over Philia's abuse. Philia arrives at the last second as Mia passes out. With the circle expanded to its proper size, the knights are able to push back the weakened monsters while Philia heals Mia. Julius escapes and steals Fiana's ring for revenge, but the moment he puts it on, he is taken over by demonic magic. Before anyone in Girtonia can celebrate winning the battle, Julius takes over the throne room and confronts Philia and Mia.
11	"Archdemon Asmodeus"; Transliteration: "Dai Akuma Asumodeusu" (Japanese: 大悪魔アスモデウス)	Yoshihito Nishōji	Keiichirō Ōchi	Yoshihito Nishōji	June 19, 2025
The knights retreat with the injured King and Fernand, leaving Philia and her friends to confront Julius possessed by Asmodeus. Wanting Philia alone, Asmodeus summons shadow-demons to kill her friends, blows up the castle, takes Hildegarde hostage, and taunts Philia with the fact that Hildegarde is actually her mother. Philia is shocked for a few seconds, but regains her composure and manages to retrieve Hildegarde with Ezra's help. Asmodeus moves to stab Erza, but stabs Philia by mistake. Uncaring, Asmodeus declares he will remove Fiana's soul from Philia's damaged body and use it to resurrect Fiana, then teleports away with Philia. Erza reveals he will have taken Philia to Limbo and the group argue over who should go to rescue her. In Limbo, Philia infects Asmodeus with her Holy magic while also healing her injuries, forcing his demonic soul to leave Julius and flee. She manages to send a magical message to her friends, acknowledging Hildegarde as her mother and saying farewell in case she dies. Deciding Osvalt is the most suitable, Erza and Mammon teleport to Limbo with him to help Philia while everyone else stays behind to handle the remaining shadow-demons. Confronting Asmodeus in his true form, he reveals that he spent 200 years crafting a perfect doll of Fiana to house her soul and memories. When Philia refuses, Asmodeus threatens to kill Julius unless she surrenders Fiana's soul. Philia agrees, but only as a distraction as Osvalt appears behind them and severs Asmodeus' hand.
12	"The Too-Perfect Saint: Tossed Aside by My Fiancé, Now in Another Kingdom"; Transliteration: "Kanpeki Sugite Kawaige ga Nai to Konyaku Haki Sareta Seijo wa Ringoku de―" (Japanese: 完璧すぎて可愛げがないと婚約破棄された聖女は隣国で―)	Shū Watanabe & Jun Takahashi	Keiichirō Ōchi	Hiroki Hayashi, Minori Mizuno & Shū Watanabe	June 26, 2025
Philia's group is overwhelmed by Asmodeus. Desperately wishing for the power to save the people she loves, Philia is visited by Fianna's spirit who apologizes for failing to seal Asmodeus properly and passes her remaining power to Philia. Philia summons the holy sword El Nortia and cuts Asmodeus' soul in half, sealing both pieces so he can never return. Osvalt almost says something important, but Erza deters him until a more appropriate time. Julius recovers and, having lost his powers, blames Philia for everything, until Mammon drags him back to prison. Girtonia recovers quickly as the castle is being rebuilt and Philia visits Hildegarde, who apologizes for not telling her the truth. Philia asks who her real father is and Hildegarde reveals that he was a healing mage who died during an epidemic when Philia was a baby. Philia eventually returns to Parnacorta, leaving Girtonia in the hands of Fernand, Mia, and Hildegarde. Reichardt understands that Philia had to help her family, but as prince of Parnacorta, he warns her the next time she tries to leave, he will be forced to stop her. A month later, all Saints attend the Saint's Summit meeting. Philia is surprised when Mia buys her a new dress for her awaited dinner with Osvalt where she admits he really did get her to fall in love with Parnacorta. Osvalt confesses he has fallen in love with her, and after pausing to analyze her feelings, Philia admits she loves him too and finally smiles.

== Reception ==
By December 2024, the series had over 1.5 million copies in circulation.

== See also ==
- A Livid Lady's Guide to Getting Even, another light novel series with the same illustrator
