= Always a Catch! =

Japanese light novel series

- Always a Catch!: How I Punched My Way into Marrying a Prince
- First light novel volume cover, featuring Renato Di Rubini (left) and Maria Annovazzi (right)

逃がした魚は大きかったが釣りあげた魚が大きすぎた件 (Nigashita Sakana wa Ōkikatta ga Tsuriageta Sakana ga Ōkisugita Ken)
- Genre: Fantasy; Romantic comedy
- Novel series

Short story
- Written by: Mayo Momoyo
- Published by: Shōsetsuka ni Narō
- Published: October 21, 2020
- Novel series

Sequel
- Written by: Mayo Momoyo
- Published by: Shōsetsuka ni Narō
- Original run: December 4, 2020 – present
- Light novel
- Written by: Mayo Momoyo
- Illustrated by: Itsuki Mito
- Published by: Square Enix
- Imprint: SQEX Novel
- Original run: August 6, 2021 – present
- Volumes: 7
- Manga
- Written by: Mayo Momoyo
- Illustrated by: Kaki Nagato
- Published by: Square Enix
- English publisher: NA: Square Enix
- Imprint: Gangan Comics UP!
- Magazine: Manga Up!
- Original run: April 24, 2022 – present
- Volumes: 11
- Anime television series
- Directed by: Akira Oguro
- Written by: Michiko Yokote
- Music by: Kana Hashiguchi; Natsuki Hamada
- Studio: Troyca (animation); TMS Entertainment (production and planning)
- Licensed by: Crunchyroll: SA/SEA: Muse Communication
- Original network: Tokyo MX, BS11
- Original run: April 2, 2026 – June 18, 2026
- Episodes: 12
- icon

Always a Catch!: How I Punched My Way into Marrying a Prince (Japanese: 逃がした魚は大きかったが釣りあげた魚が大きすぎた件, Hepburn: Nigashita Sakana wa Ōkikatta ga Tsuriageta Sakana ga Ōkisugita Ken) is a Japanese light novel series written by Mayo Momoyo and illustrated by Itsuki Mito. It began publication as a short story on the user-generated novel publishing website Shōsetsuka ni Narō in October 2020. A sequel series began serialization in December 2020. It was later acquired by Square Enix who began publishing it under their SQEX Novel imprint in August 2021. A manga adaptation illustrated by Kaki Nagato began serialization on Square Enix's Manga Up! manga service in April 2022. An anime television series adaptation produced by TMS Entertainment and animated by Troyca aired from April to June 2026.

== Plot ==
Maria, the fifth daughter of the Duke Annovazzi, was raised to be the heir to her family's dukedom and mastered the family's martial arts. However, she loses her title as heir and travels to the neighboring kingdom of Rubini to find a marriage partner. There, the crown prince ends up taking Maria as his fiancée.

== Characters ==
Maria Annovazzi (マリーア・アンノヴァッツィ, Marīa Annovattsi) / Maria di Rubini (マリーア・ディ・ルビーニ, Marīa di Rubīni) (from Volume 4 onward)
Voiced by: Yū Serizawa
The protagonist of the story. Nicknamed Mimi. She is the fifth daughter of the Duke Annovazzi of the Kingdom of Muro. Before her younger brother was born, she was expected to be the heir to the dukedom, and thus mastered the family's traditional martial arts style, consisting of 80 forms. While studying abroad in the Kingdom of Rubini with the aim of finding a marriage partner, she ends up becoming engaged to Renato. The king and queen come to like her, and she receives formal training to become crown princess, including etiquette lessons. However, her free-spirited personality and tendency to resolve problems through force (i.e., martial arts) remain unchanged.
Renato di Rubini (レナート・ディ・ルビーニ, Renāto di Rubīni)
Voiced by: Atsushi Tamaru
First prince of the Kingdom of Rubini. He was tormented by the political engagement arranged between him and Aida, whom his younger brother had feelings for. Later, using a certain incident as a pretext, he attempts to annul the engagement with Aida, but mistakenly informs her cousin Maria of the annulment instead. Eventually, he falls in love with Maria, proposes to her, and is accepted—shortly thereafter, he is officially named crown prince. Despite numerous challenges, he and Maria overcome them together and finally manage to get married.
Aida Ametis (アイーダ・アメーティス, Aīda Amētisu) / Aida di Rubini (アイーダ・ディ・ルビーニ, Aīda di Rubīni) (from Volume 4 onward)
Voiced by: Saori Hayami
A noble lady from the Ametis ducal family of the Kingdom of Rubini. Maria stayed with her as a relative. Unlike Maria, Aida is the picture of a perfect lady. Her father arranged the engagement with Renato in hopes of making her queen one day, but Renato ultimately breaks off the engagement. Although Aida and Maria are on good terms, when Maria impulsively ran into a burning building to rescue people—an act that led the king to issue a disciplinary suspension and caused many, including Renato, to be reprimanded—Aida sternly scolded her for her actions.
Placido di Rubini (プラチド・ディ・ルビーニ, Purachido di Rubīni)
Voiced by: Shūichirō Umeda
Second prince of the Kingdom of Rubini. Through his brother Renato's efforts, he becomes engaged to Aida and holds his wedding before Renato does.
Raimondo Cigata (ライモンド・チガータ, Raimondo Chigāta)
Voiced by: Taku Yashiro
One of Renato's close aides. Son of a marquis. A talented bureaucrat, though he often gets dragged into chaos by Maria.
Ireneo Marchei (イレネオ・マルケイ, Ireneo Marukei)
Voiced by: Natsuki Hanae
Renato and Placido's cousin. Despite already being in his early thirties, he still willingly charms and flirts with any women he sets his eyes on.
Eleonora Casciari (エレオノラ・カシャーリ, Ereonora Kashāri)
Voiced by: Kaori Maeda
Rosalia Pinotti (ロザリア・ピノッティ, Rozaria Pinotti)
Voiced by: Rumi Okubo
Maria's Father (ミミ父, Mimi Chichi)
Voiced by: Tetsu Inada
Queen Rubini (ルビーニ王妃, Rubīni Ōhi)
Voiced by: Yūko Kaida
Teodorico (テオドリーコ, Teodoriko)
Voiced by: Asaki Yuikawa
Zaira (ザイラ)
Voiced by: Kana Hanazawa
Gabriele Morand (ガブリエーレ・モランド, Gaburiēre Morando)
Renato's foster brother and trusted companion. Formerly part of the royal guard. He is outraged when he learns during an overseas assignment that Renato's fiancée has changed, but eventually becomes a sparring buddy and friend to Maria.

== Media ==
=== Light novel ===
Written by Mayo Momoyo, Always a Catch! was initially published as a short story on the user-generated novel publishing website Shōsetsuka ni Narō on October 21, 2020. A sequel series began serialization on December 4, 2020. It was later acquired by Square Enix who began publishing the series with illustrations by Itsuki Mito under their SQEX Novel light novel imprint on August 6, 2021. Seven volumes have been released as of April 7, 2026.

| No. | Release date | ISBN |
|---|---|---|
| 1 | August 6, 2021 | 978-4-7575-7412-0 |
| 2 | July 7, 2022 | 978-4-7575-8024-4 |
| 3 | October 6, 2023 | 978-4-7575-8516-4 |
| 4 | February 7, 2024 | 978-4-7575-9043-4 |
| 5 | December 6, 2024 | 978-4-7575-9560-6 |
| 6 | November 7, 2025 | 978-4-301-00156-0 |
| 7 | April 7, 2026 | 978-4-301-00444-8 |

=== Manga ===
A manga adaptation illustrated by Kaki Nagato began serialization on Square Enix's Manga Up! manga service on April 24, 2022. The manga's chapters have been compiled into eleven tankōbon volumes as of July 2026.

The series is published in English on Square Enix's Manga Up! Global website and app. In February 2025, Square Enix Manga & Books announced that they had licensed the series for English publication, with the first volume being released in November 2024.

| No. | Original release date | Original ISBN | North American release date | North American ISBN |
|---|---|---|---|---|
| 1 | July 7, 2022 | 978-4-7575-8019-0 | November 26, 2024 | 978-1-64609-308-3 |
Chapters 1–3; Special side story: "Malvar's, a Restaurant of Many Memories"
| 2 | December 7, 2022 | 978-4-7575-8297-2 | March 18, 2025 | 978-1-64609-320-5 |
Chapters 4–7; Bonus: "Watching a Star's Romance With You"; Special side story: "Maria in the Land of Nod"
| 3 | April 7, 2023 | 978-4-7575-8513-3 | June 17, 2025 | 978-1-64609-321-2 |
Chapters 8–11
| 4 | September 7, 2023 | 978-4-7575-8773-1 | September 16, 2025 | 978-1-64609-322-9 |
Chapters 12–15; Special side story: "Placido's Intuition"
| 5 | February 7, 2024 | 978-4-7575-9039-7 | December 9, 2025 | 978-1-64609-346-5 |
Chapters 16–19; Special side story: "Too Sweet a Gift"
| 6 | July 5, 2024 | 978-4-7575-9290-2 | March 24, 2026 | 978-1-64609-420-2 |
Chapters 20–23; Special side story: "The Arresting Maria"
| 7 | December 7, 2024 | 978-4-7575-9555-2 | June 2, 2026 | 978-1-64609-454-7 |
Chapters 24–27; Special side story: "The Scariest Punishment"
| 8 | May 7, 2025 | 978-4-7575-9840-9 | September 1, 2026 | 978-1-64609-486-8 |
Chapters 28–31; Special side story: "Good Medicine Still Tastes Bitter"
| 9 | November 7, 2025 | 978-4-301-00151-5 | December 1, 2026 | 979-8-89910-019-2 |
| 10 | April 7, 2026 | 978-4-301-00440-0 | — | — |
| 11 | July 7, 2026 | 978-4-3010-0624-4 | — | — |

=== Anime ===
An anime television series adaptation was announced on November 3, 2025. Produced and planned by TMS Entertainment, the series is animated by Troyca and directed by Akira Oguro, with Michiko Yokote handling series composition, Isamu Suzuki designing the characters, and Kana Hashiguchi and Natsuki Hamada composing the music. Was aired from April 2 to June 18, 2026, on Tokyo MX and other networks. The opening theme song, "Chikai wa Kyun to", is performed by HoneyWorks and Airi Suzuki, and the ending theme song, "Dead or Love", is performed by Yoshino. Crunchyroll is streaming the series. Muse Communication licensed the series in South and Southeast Asia.

==== Episodes ====
| No. | Title | Directed by (Note: Production staff information is taken from the ending credits of each episode.) | Written by | Storyboarded by | Original release date |
|---|---|---|---|---|---|
| 1 | "How I Searched for a Promising Catch"; Transliteration: "Nigashita Sakana wa Yūryō Bukken o Sagasu" (Japanese: 逃がした魚は優良物件を探す) | Yūki Nagasawa | Michiko Yokote | Akira Oguro | April 2, 2026 |
Maria, daughter of Duke Annovazzi from Muro Kingdom, is sent to live in the household of her friend Aida, daughter of Duke Ametis from Rubini Kingdom. Aida is upset at her arranged engagement to Prince Renato Rubini, whom she does not love. Maria reveals due to the birth of her brother Teo she will no longer inherit her father's title, so she has come to Rubini to find a husband. At Royal Academy Aida introduces Maria to Renato's younger brother Placido, with whom Aida is close friends. Renato passes by and is shown to be aloof and serious. Due to her hyperactive enthusiasm Maria accidentally injures classmate Eleonora Casciari. At the graduation party for Renato's class, Renato escorts Eleonora instead of Aida, fuelling rumours. Renato grabs Maria's hand, accuses her of jealousy and attacking Eleonora, ends their engagement and demands she voluntarily leave Royal Academy. Maria is furious to realise Renato is so oblivious of his own fiancée he has mistaken her for Aida. Furious on Aida's behalf, Maria reveals she is not Aida, slaps Renato's hand away and demands he start wearing glasses, implying he is a blind idiot in front of everybody.
| 2 | "How I Caught the One That Got Away"; Transliteration: "Nigashita Sakana wa Tsukamatchau" (Japanese: 逃がした魚は捕まっちゃう) | Jun Takahashi | Michiko Yokote | Akira Oguro | April 9, 2026 |
Renato is scolded by Placido and his aide Raimondo until he apologises. Maria realises her behaviour might have ruined her chance at finding a husband. Renato summons Maria for a proper apology. He explains he has been avoiding Aida for years since Placido is in love with her, causing him to genuinely not know what she looked like. Plus, he hoped by causing scandal he would be replaced as Crown Prince by Placido, making it more likely Duke Ametis would accept Aida marrying Placido instead. Inviting Maria to dinner the next day, Renato reveals he is disappointed he will still be named Crown Prince, albeit on a delayed schedule. Maria is later kidnapped by Eleonora, since Renato discovered her father's corruption and imprisoned him, so she intends to trade Maria for her father. Renato organises a search for Maria. Maria escapes since she is a master of the Annovazzi martial art style and easily defeats the thugs. She is embarrassed to realise Renato saw her fight and probably thinks she is a beastly woman. This turns to shock when Renato confesses he has been amazed by her since they met, and asks her to marry him.
| 3 | "How I Trained to Become a Lady"; Transliteration: "Nigashita Sakana wa Shukujo ni Naru Tame no Kunren" (Japanese: 逃がした魚は捕ま淑女になるための訓練) | Yoshihito Nishōji | Sumika Hayakawa | Akira Oguro | April 16, 2026 |
Renato is made Crown Prince and Maria scheduled to meet his parents, the King and Queen. Maria is so nervous she becomes lost and is eventually found petting Macaron, the lost puppy of Renato's grandmother. Both she and the King find this hilarious, but for some reason the Queen appears furious. Maria becomes Crown Princess and asks Aida to train her in Royal Etiquette. Rosalia Pinotti, a Marquis' daughter who had been bullying Aida while trying to seduce Renato herself, now switches to bullying Maria. Alas, Maria thinks Rosalia wants to be friends, confusing Rosalia so much she ends up inviting Maria on a summer beach trip. The Queen invites Maria to tea, but Raimondo warns her it is a test of worthiness, as the Queen is notoriously strict on etiquette. Renato becomes more attached to Maria after learning she is spending a week visiting her family without him. During tea with the unimpressed Queen, an assassin suddenly shoots at them and Maria protects the Queen. Unable to hold back anymore, the Queen reveals her strictness is all an act and in fact she finds Maria almost unbearably cute. Nearby, a man is pleased Maria is more interesting than he first thought.
| 4 | "How the One That Got Away Was Troubled"; Transliteration: "Nigashita Sakana ga Kakaete Ita Mondai" (Japanese: 逃した魚が抱えていた問題) | Jun Takahashi | Konomi Shugo | Yuichi Shimodaira | April 23, 2026 |
Maria leaves during the chaos to find Renato, but she encounters his cousin instead, Ireneo, a notorious seducer. Ireneo claims to love Maria, despite having already being punished by Renato several times, and Maria does her best to ignore him. The Knight Captain believes the Queen was the intended target but has no proof. Renato insists Maria spend the night at the castle for her safety, but Raimondo points out the Queen is still in a state of excitement and Ireneo is also staying overnight, so it is definitely safer for Maria to go home instead. Renato heightens security around the castle and the academy. Rosalia continues trying to bully Maria but again Maria is impervious to her insults. Ireneo also visits to invite her on a date, but she realises he reminds her of her baby brother. As Maria is visiting her parents soon Raimondo warns her the route has become dangerous due to bandits. Renato becomes interested in her martial arts. Maria admits there are some techniques he hasn't seen her use yet as they are family secrets known only to her and her father. She admits she is no longer as close with her father as she would like, since he now has a male heir. Renato is sure they will return to normal during her visit.
| 5 | "How the One That Got Away Visited Home"; Transliteration: "Nigashita Sakana ga Furusato o Otozureta Hōhō" (Japanese: 逃した魚が故郷を訪れた方法) | Himari Tamagawa | Sumika Hayakawa | Hiroki Hayashi | April 30, 2026 |
Maria reaches a border town near Muro Kingdom and is picked up by her family's giant, muscular manservants Goffredo and Macchio. They inform her that since her engagement her father has been in a mood and all her married sisters have come home to see her. They are stopped by bandits but Maria notices they look like ordinary farmers. Seeing Maria is a noble the men immediately admit they have been waiting for a noble to pass by to arrest them. They explain the daughter of the Chief of Navarro village has disappeared but Count Nardi doesn't care, so they turned to petty crime hoping they would be taken to the castle and could appeal directly to the Knight Captain for help. Maria gives them her monogrammed handkerchief which should get them a meeting with Raimondo. Real bandits attack a carriage down the road. Despite promising Raimondo she wouldn't cause trouble, she helps Goffredo and Macchio scare off the bandits. She then directs the farmers to repair the carriage so the noble owner will owe them gratitude and hopefully convince the Knight Captain to help them. Continuing onwards, she reaches her family's mansion.
| 6 | "How the One That Got Away Fought With Her Father"; Transliteration: "Nigashita Sakana to Tatakau Chichi" (Japanese: 逃がした魚と闘う父) | Minori Mizuno | Sumika Hayakawa | Kenji Satō | May 7, 2026 |
Maria recalls because she was made heir and trained in the family martial arts every day. she had absolutely nothing in common with refined ladies her own age and instead got on better with boys, except the ones that wanted to marry her for her family title. She is welcomed home by her mother and sisters Idea, Nina, Sandra and Gionna. Her father is grumpy that Maria would choose a man weaker than herself, then surprised when Maria claims Renato always outmanoeuvres her, and so strong she can't escape his hugs. Ignoring her father's bad mood, Maria goes to play with Teodorico. He admits he can do up to form 18 of their martial art, disappointing him as Maria could do up to 25 when she was his age. Maria assures him one day he will be as strong as their father. Since Rubini and Muro don't have a peace treaty, her father demands a duel to see if she can handle life as princess of an enemy kingdom. Their duel is a draw, and he accepts she is ready. He also promises not to be too mean to Renato when they meet. Raimondo informs Renato about the farmers, so Renato heads to Navarro to deal with the ignorant Count Nardi, and maybe visit Maria while he is there.
| 7 | "The Fists of the One That Got Away"; Transliteration: "Tsuriageta Sakana no Ken" (Japanese: 釣りあげた魚の拳) | Shū Watanabe; Yūki Nagasawa | Konomi Shugo | Hiroki Hayashi | May 14, 2026 |
Maria's mother and sisters are glad Maria and her father's relationship is back to normal; constant fighting. Maria visits Navarro and learns the chief's daughter, Veronica, was last seen getting into Nardi's carriage. Plus, Nardi's guards were just seen arguing with the bandits Maria beat up previously, insisting they hand over the village crops. The villagers reveal the crop is a spice that smells pleasant when flowering, but stinks the rest of the time. Maria infiltrates Nardi's mansion and overhears he has been in the capital for two months, so he could not have kidnapped Veronica. Maria locates Veronica with Nardi's son Hugo, who explains he and Veronica wish to marry, but Count Vesentini is insisting Hugo marry his daughter Ella in exchange for buying the crops. The bandits attempt to steal the crops to sell to Vesentini themselves, but the villagers stand up to them until the bandits giant boss arrives. Renato arrives with his knights, so Maria knocks the boss unconscious. One bandit tries to attack Renato, but Renato reveals he memorised some of Maria's martial art and sends the bandit flying with Maria's favourite punch to the jaw. Raimondo ends up traumatised that Renato punched a bandit with his own royal hand.
| 8 | "The Secret Date of the One That Got Away"; Transliteration: "Nigashita Sakana no Oshinobi Dēto" (Japanese: 逃がした魚のお忍びデート) | Shinichi Fukumoto | Konomi Shugo | Kenji Satō | May 21, 2026 |
Renato reveals Vesentini has been dealt with, as the crops Nardi has been selling him are processed into an illegal drug in Rubini Kingdom, and Hugo's marriage to Vesentini's daughter would have given Vesentini control of the farms growing the crops. As the crop is harmless unless specially processed, Renato determines Nardi and the farmers were unaware of Vesentini's drug operation. Veronica's father allows her engagement to Hugo, and they decide to find a new use for their crops, starting with using it as a spice in cooking. Renato takes Maria on a secret date to a tourist town where she spends most of her time preventing people noticing the Crown Prince wandering around like a normal citizen. As Muro is a landlocked kingdom Maria has never had seafood before, and marvels at grilled squid. Renato admits he is enjoying being alone together, unaware Raimondo has been following them all evening. After getting rid of a pervert, Renato regrets Maria's life will constantly be in danger as his wife, unable to even trust her food unless tested for poison first. Maria accepts the risk and insists she will still marry him. They almost kiss, but Raimondo interrupts to prevent pre-marriage misbehaviour.
| 9 | "The One Who Got Away Plays Cupid"; Transliteration: "Nigashita Sakana wa Koi no Kyūpiddo" (Japanese: 逃がした魚は恋のキューピッド) | Jun Takahashi; Takashi Yoshizoe | Michiko Yokote | Akira Oguro | May 28, 2026 |
Renato insists Placido stop making excuses and propose marriage to Aida. Aida confides in Maria her fear of the gossip that would follow becoming engaged to her ex-fiance's brother. Frustrated at them, Maria traps them in the library to talk, but they only discuss books. Maria considers asking the Queen to order them to marry, but Renato insists this would cause unhappiness. Maria realises she must coax them together so they make the decision to marry themselves. Raimondo gives Maria a chestnut cake to apologise to Aida. The cake reminds Aida of meeting Raimondo and they argued over a certain chestnut tree, so she threw chestnuts at him. Years later, Aida was disappointed to be chosen as Renato's fiancée, and upset Placido let it happen. Maria urges Aida to fight for what she wants. Aida's father reveals several nobles are still interested in marrying her. One of those nobles insults Aida as "damaged goods, but wealthy", so Placido challenges him to duel. Aida prevents the duel and Placido curses himself for being too weak to defend her honour. Aida decides she will defend him instead, and asks to be his wife, which he accepts. Renato is unsurprised, since in her own way Aida is as strong as Maria. Aida credits Maria with teaching her to be brave.
| 10 | "The One Who Got Away Prepares For a Ball"; Transliteration: "Nigashita Sakana no Yakai Junbi" (Japanese: 逃がした魚の夜会準備) | Minori Mizuno | Michiko Yokote | Minori Mizuno | June 4, 2026 |
Both engagements are publicly announced, along with a royal ball. Maria is surprised there is a dance she can't afford to mess up. Learning to dance turns out to be harder than fighting, so she escapes to choose her perfume from Rosalia's father Count Pinotti, a perfumer by trade. He reveals thanks to her he purchased the crops from Hugo, specifically the flower, and used it to make a new perfume. Rosalia creates perfumes for Maria and Aida. Rosalia warns Maria to beware the ball, as there will be guests from other kingdoms and any mistake could easily become a scandal. Maria and Aida visit the Queen for a tea party where Ireneo tries to seduce Maria but is soon driven off. The Queen reveals Ireneo was a candidate for Crown Prince due to her fertility problems. When she gave birth to Renato, Ireneo lost his position. From sympathy his behaviour was indulged until he became a useless seducer. Renato reveals many adults manipulated Ireneo for his potential then abandoned him when Renato was born. While this deeply affected Ireneo, Renato insists it is no excuse for his shameful behaviour towards women and he has no intention of covering up his scandals forever. Elsewhere, a woman swears revenge on Maria.
| 11 | "The One Who Got Away Gets Dragged into Romantic Trouble"; Transliteration: "Nigashita Sakana wa Koi no Izakoza ni Makikomareru" (Japanese: 逃がした魚は恋のいざこざに巻き込まれる) | Jun Takahashi | Michiko Yokote | Kenji Satō | June 11, 2026 |
Raimondo is forced to issue apologies for even more of Ireneo's scandals, so Renato uninvites him from the ball. Maria notices a guest behaving suspiciously and follows her. She loses her but ends up beneath Ireneo's window. He urges her to try the peach tarts, the royal chef's speciality for balls. Maria steals a tart for him, which Ireneo insists on sharing with wine. Maria deduces Ireneo acts like a fool to ensure no one wants him on the throne, avoiding a succession dispute between him and the princes. The suspicious guest, Zaira, bursts in with her men, revealing she is Ireneo's disturbed stalker who blames Maria for Ireneo dumping her. She even confesses to arranging the archer that shot at Maria during tea with the Queen. Maria tries to protect Ireneo but collapses from the wine. Drawn by the screaming, Renato bursts in, only to find Ireneo and Zaira cowering while Maria beats up the guards with Drunken Fist style. Renato's presence calms her into falling asleep, so he decides to scold her when she is sober. Renato has Ireneo locked up until he can decide how to punish him. Zaira is arrested for attacking royalty. Luckily, Maria wakes up in time for the dance.
| 12 | "How I Punched My Way into Marrying a Prince"; Transliteration: "Nigashita Sakana wa Ōkikatta ga Tsuriageta Sakana ga Ōkisugita Ken" (Japanese: 逃がした魚は大きかったが釣りあげた魚が大きすぎた件) | Jun Takahashi | Michiko Yokote | Akira Oguro | June 18, 2026 |
Raimondo evaluates Zaira's mental state. Maria struggles with a hangover and vague memories of her drunken rampage. Maria notices Aida is unusually pale with no appetite. In secret, Aida cannot stand the gossip surrounding her former engagement to Renato and current engagement to Placido, leaving her unable to sleep, so she is glad of their support. Maria manages to dance perfectly with Renato, surprising and pleasing the gossiping guests. Maria is overjoyed Renato arranged in secret for her family to attend the ball alongside the King and Queen. The Queen falls in love with Teodorico as well as Maria. Renato informs Maria Ireneo is under house arrest at a relatives mansion, but he suspects he is already up to no good concerning Zaira. Renato admits becoming crown prince makes him anxious to live up to everyone's expectations. Maria promises to always support him. Renato admits he only has one regret; that when they first met he mistook her for Aida and was momentarily upset at having to end their engagement. As he already calls her by the nickname Mimi, he asks she call him Renato instead of Prince. Maria is so embarrassed she tries to hit him, but once again Renato is too fast and catches her fist, causing them both to laugh.

== Reception ==
By November 2025, the series had over 1 million copies in circulation.
