= Overtake! =

Japanese anime television series

- Teaser visual
- オーバーテイク!
- Genre: Sports
- Created by: Kadokawa; Troyca
- Written by: Ayumi Sekine
- Directed by: Ei Aoki
- Music by: Kana Utatane
- Country of origin: Japan
- Original language: Japanese
- No. of episodes: 12

Production
- Animator: Troyca
- Production companies: Kadokawa; Troyca; Tencent Games; Bandai Namco Music Live; AT-X; BS11; Good Smile Company; TV Aichi

Original release
- Network: AT-X, Tokyo MX, Sun TV, BS11, TVA
- Release: October 1 – December 17, 2023

Overtake! (Japanese: オーバーテイク!, Hepburn: Ōbāteiku!) is an original Japanese anime television series about the F4 Japanese Championship created by Kadokawa Corporation and Troyca. It is directed by Ei Aoki and written by Ayumi Sekine, and aired from October to December 2023.

== Characters ==
The cast of Overtake!

=== Main characters ===
Haruka Asahina (浅雛 悠, Asahina Haruka)
Voiced by: Anan Furuya, Kana Ichinose (childhood) (Note: Information is taken from the ending credits of each episode.)
A Formula 4 driver with Komaki Motors who is a quiet high school student.
Kouya Madoka (眞賀 孝哉, Madoka Kouya)
Voiced by: Katsuyuki Konishi
A freelance photographer. He finds himself in a slump due to a certain reason.

=== Komaki Motors ===
Kotarou Komaki (小牧 錮太郎, Komaki Kotarou)
Voiced by: Tasuku Hatanaka
The mechanic of Komaki Motors. He grew up like a close brother to Haruka.
Futoshi Komaki (小牧 太, Komaki Futoshi)
Voiced by: Kenta Sasa
The team owner of Komaki Motors, a small privateer team. Father of Kotarou.

=== Belsorriso ===
Satsuki Harunaga (春永 早月, Harunaga Satsuki)
Voiced by: Kengo Kawanishi
The first driver of the Belsorriso's F4 team.
A cheerful and talented driver who already has many female fans. His talent is highly praised, and Ena is developing him to move up to F3 and then F2. He admires the former F1 driver James Hunt.
Toshiki Tokumaru (徳丸 俊軌, Tokumaru Toshiki)
Voiced by: Taku Yashiro
The second driver of the Belsorriso's F4 team.
He is considered to have the same potential as Satsuki. But having crushed into Haruka's car during his driver's audition by the team, it led to him being hired as Satsuki's support driver. Thus, he is not satisfied with the role, and has a grudge against Haruka.
Alice Mitsuzawa (蜜澤 亜梨子, Mitsuzawa Arisu)
Voiced by: Reina Ueda
A grid girl of Belsorriso. She admires Satsuki but is too shy to talk with him without being embarrassed.
She is a childhood friend of Kotarou and attends the same high school as him and Haruka. Thus, she also supports Komaki Motors.
Kyousuke Ena (笑生 教典, E'na Kyousuke)
Voiced by: Masayuki Katō
The team owner of Belsorriso.
Though the team itself is focused on the Super GT's GT500 and GT300 classes, Ena is passionate about developing young drivers and leads the F4 team himself.
Also, he highly appreciated Kouya's abilities as a photographer, and kindly informs him about F4.

=== Others ===
Saeko Yukihira (雪平 冴子, Yukihira Saeko)
Voiced by: Ayumi Tsunematsu
The chief editor of "Monthly Kyouka", a fashion magazine for women. She is the ex-wife of Kouya, and helps him recover from his trauma by supporting him with offering him work.
She introduces "Mikazuki", a beverage company, to Komaki Motors as a sponsor.

== Production ==
Overtake! is produced by Kadokawa Corporation and animated by Troyca. Naoki Hattori assisted Troyca in the production of the anime by ensuring scenes of F4 racing are portrayed as realistic as possible. Original character designs were provided by Takako Shimura, while Masako Matsumoto adapted the designs for animation. Katsuhiko Takayama is credited for supervision. Kana Utatane composed the music. The opening theme song, "Tailwind", is performed by the VTuber Kanae, while the ending theme song is "Good Luck" by Tasuku Hatanaka. The series aired from October 1 to December 17, 2023, on AT-X and other networks.

Crunchyroll licensed the series outside of Asia. Medialink licensed the series in South, Southeast Asia and Oceania (except Australia and New Zealand) and will be streamed on YouTube via Ani-One Asia.

All of the episodes will be publicly screened at Tachikawa Cinema City, with Ei Aoki and Anan Furuya, as guests on February 24, 2024.

The first home video volume was released on December 22, 2023; the second on January 24, 2024; and the third and final one on February 28 of the same year.

=== Episodes ===
No.	Title	Directed by	Written by	Storyboarded by	Original release date
1	"The Man Who Races"; Transliteration: "Hashiru Otoko" (Japanese: 走る男 ―I don't need to be cheered on.―)	Ei Aoki; Shuu Watanabe	Ayumi Sekine	Ei Aoki	October 1, 2023
2	"Enthusiasm and Spirit"; Transliteration: "Nori to Ikioi" (Japanese: ノリと勢い ―Told ya, roller coaster.―)	Makoto Katō	Ayumi Sekine	Makoto Katō; Ei Aoki; Hitomi Ezoe	October 8, 2023
3	"How Many Kilometers to the Winner's Podium?"; Transliteration: "Hyōshōdai Made nan Kiromētoru?" (Japanese: 表彰台まで何キロメートル？ ―Why?―)	Kai Hasako	Ayumi Sekine	Kai Hasako; Ei Aoki	October 15, 2023
4	"Pasts and Regrets"; Transliteration: "Kako to Kōkai" (Japanese: 過去と後悔 ―His good points? Don't ask me.―)	Shōtarō Kitamura	Ayumi Sekine	Shōtarō Kitamura	October 22, 2023
5	"Chariots of Fire"; Transliteration: "Honō no Rannā" (Japanese: 炎のランナー ―It's just luck.―)	Shōko Shiga	Ayumi Sekine; Ei Aoki	Ranzaki Akari; Shōko Shiga; Ei Aoki	October 29, 2023
6	"Suzuka, Rain"; Transliteration: "Suzuka, Ame" (Japanese: 鈴鹿、雨 ―I don't want you to race.―)	Shuu Watanabe	Ayumi Sekine	Hiroki Hayashi	November 5, 2023
7	"Underexposure"; Transliteration: "Roshutsu Andā" (Japanese: 露出アンダー ―What I really feel...―)	Takayuki Kuriyama	Ayumi Sekine	Kai Hasako; Ei Aoki; Takayuki Kuriyama	November 12, 2023
8	"Birds of a Feather"; Transliteration: "Onajiana no Mujinatachi" (Japanese: 同じ穴のムジナたち ―Y'know what makes a fast driver？―)	Himari Tamagawa	Katsuhiko Takayama	Hiroki Hayashi	November 19, 2023
9	"The Day of the Disaster"; Transliteration: "Wazawai Wazawai no Hi" (Japanese: 厄災の日 ―What really happened？―)	Makoto Katō	Ayumi Sekine; Ei Aoki	Makoto Katō	November 26, 2023
10	"Never Say Never"; Transliteration: "Nebā Sei Nebā" (Japanese: ネバー・セイ・ネバー ―It's gonna be a long race.―)	Makoto Bessho	Katsuhiko Takayama	Makoto Bessho	December 3, 2023
11	"Hop→ Step→"; Transliteration: "Hoppu → Suteppu→" (Japanese: ホップ→ステップ→ ―Godspeed! Psych！―)	Hiroki Hayashi	Katsuhiko Takayama	Hikori Hayashi	December 10, 2023
12	"Overtake"; Transliteration: "Obāteiku" (Japanese: オーバーテイク ―Do your best! ―)	Shu Watanabe; Minori Mizuno; Ei Aoki	Ayumi Sekine; Ei Aoki	Ei Aoki	December 17, 2023
