= Beautiful Bones: Sakurako's Investigation =

Japanese light novel series

- First novel volume cover

櫻子さんの足下には死体が埋まっている (Sakurako-san no Ashimoto ni wa Shitai ga Umatteiru)
- Genre: Mystery
- Light novel
- Written by: Shiori Ōta
- Illustrated by: Tetsuo
- Published by: Kadokawa Shoten
- Imprint: Kadokawa Bunko
- Original run: February 2013 – March 2021
- Volumes: 17
- Manga
- Written by: Shiori Ōta
- Illustrated by: Tō Mizuguchi
- Published by: Kadokawa Shoten
- Magazine: Young Ace
- Original run: August 2015 – December 2017
- Volumes: 2
- Anime television series
- Directed by: Makoto Katō
- Produced by: Kenjirō Gomi
- Written by: Takayo Ikami
- Music by: Technoboys Pulcraft Green-Fund
- Studio: Troyca
- Licensed by: AUS: Hanabee; NA: Sentai Filmworks; UK: Anime Limited
- Original network: Tokyo MX, KBS, Sun TV, HBC, TV Saitama, Chiba TV, tvk, GBS, BS11, MTV, TVQ
- Original run: October 7, 2015 – December 23, 2015
- Episodes: 12
- Television drama
- Directed by: Yūichi Satō; Daisuke Yamauchi
- Written by: Junpei Yamaoka
- Music by: Yugo Kanno
- Original network: Fuji TV
- Original run: April 23, 2017 – June 25, 2017
- Episodes: 10

Beautiful Bones: Sakurako's Investigation or A Corpse is Buried Under Sakurako's Feet (櫻子さんの足下には死体が埋まっている, Sakurako-san no Ashimoto ni wa Shitai ga Umatteiru) is a Japanese mystery novel series written by Shiori Ōta, with illustrations by Tetsuo. Kadokawa Shoten has published seventeen volumes since 2013 under their Kadokawa Bunko label, with over 1 million copies in print. The final volume in the series was released in March 2021. An anime television series adaptation by Troyca aired in Japan between October and December 2015. A live-action television series adaptation aired between April 23 and June 25, 2017, on Fuji TV.

== Plot ==
Sakurako Kujō is a highly intelligent girl in her mid-twenties whose life is centered around one thing and one thing only: bones. With little tolerance for others, she would be completely enveloped in her study of skeletons if high school boy Shōtaro did not become her new assistant and constant companion. Why exactly she has taken a shine to him remains a mystery, but one thing is clear: whenever the two go out together, the chances are high that they will come across a human corpse.

== Characters ==
Sakurako Kujō (九条 櫻子, Kujō Sakurako)
Voiced by: Ami Koshimizu (radio drama), Shizuka Itō (anime)
Played by: Alisa Mizuki
She is a beautiful woman who comes from a prominent family and lives in a big old house with only a housekeeper as a companion. She has a hobby of collecting the bones of dead animals and reconstructing them. However, she is more interested in human remains. And with her being an osteologist, she also developed forensic skills from her uncle, a prominent forensic scientist in the prefecture, and has helped with many unsolved murders. She has a dislike for interpersonal relationships, although she has a fiancé working with the Hokkaido Prefectural Police. She would often refer to Shōtarō as "shōnen" ("boy") instead of his real name.
Shōtarō Tatewaki (館脇 正太郎, Tatewaki Shōtarō)
Voiced by: Yuki Kaji (radio drama), Junya Enoki (anime)
Played by: Taisuke Fujigaya
He is a high school boy who assists Sakurako in her bone-digging expeditions. It so happens that they always find human remains in the process. He keeps Sakurako in check, as she tends to go crazy and try to keep the human remains for herself.
Yuriko Kōgami (鴻上 百合子, Kōgami Yuriko)
Voiced by: Ayaka Imamura (anime)
Shōtarō's classmate who keeps becoming entwined with his cases by coincidence.
Ume Sawa (沢 梅, Sawa Ume) / Gran (ばあやさん, Baaya-san)
Voiced by: Masako Isobe (anime)
Played by: Machiko Washio
Sakurako's caretaker, who is kind-hearted but also strict, particularly when it comes to Sakurako's love of sweets.
Itsuki Isozaki (磯崎 齋, Isozaki Itsuki)
Voiced by: Shunya Hiruma (radio drama), Akira Ishida (anime)
Played by: Takaya Kamikawa
A life science teacher at Shōtarō's school. He is handsome and slightly arrogant though he does care for his students.
Naoe Ariwara (在原 直江, Ariwara Naoe)
Naoe is Sakurako's fiance who works as a police officer, and vouches for her when she works on a case.
Hiroki Utsumi (内海 洋貴, Utsumi Hiroki)
Voiced by: Hiroki Takahashi (anime)
Utsumi is a police officer who often helps Sakurako and Shōtarō on cases.
Hector (へクター, Hekutā)
A dog previously owned by a family Sakurako helped. After said family moved into an apartment they gave Hector to Sakurako. Hector consistently exhibits a powerful interest and excitement toward corpses, seeking them out and staying near them when he finds them, and getting as excited as Sakurako when new skeletons arrive.
Haruto Imai (今居 陽人, Imai Haruto)
Voiced by: Tetsuya Kakihara (anime)
A classmate and friend of Shōtarō's.
Sōko Chiyoda (千代田 薔子, Chiyoda Sōko)
Voiced by: Kikuko Inoue (anime)
Sakurako's aunt who is a florist.
Hanabusa (花房, Hanabusa)
Voiced by: Takehito Koyasu (anime)
A professional painter. He is the mastermind behind many of the homicides that Sakurako investigates.

== Media ==
=== Light novels ===
The first novel, A Corpse is Buried Under Sakurako's Feet, was published on February 23, 2013, by Kadokawa. By 2015, the series had sold over 600,000 copies. Sixteen subsequent volumes were released with the seventeenth and final volume in the main story being published on March 24, 2021. A spin-off book was published on May 24, 2022.

==== Volumes ====
A Corpse is Buried Under Sakurako's Feet novel series
| No. | Title | Original release date | English release date |
|---|---|---|---|
| 1 | 櫻子さんの足下には死体が埋まっている; Sakurako-san no Ashimoto ni wa Shitai ga Umatteiru | February 23, 2013 | 9784041006955 |
| 2 | 骨と石榴と夏休み; Hone to Zakuro to Natsuyasumi | May 25, 2013 | 9784041008393 |
| 3 | 雨と九月と君の嘘; Ame to Kugatsu to Kimi no Uso | September 25, 2013 | 9784041010105 |
| 4 | 蝶は十一月に消えた; Chō wa Jūgatsu ni Kieta | February 25, 2014 | 9784041012277 |
| 5 | 冬の記憶と時の地図; Fuyu no Kioku to Toki no Chizu | June 20, 2014 | 9784041016305 |
| 6 | 白から始まる秘密; Shiro kara Hajimaru Himitsu | November 22, 2014 | 9784041016312 |
| 7 | 謡う指先; Utau Yubisaki | February 25, 2015 | 9784041016329 |
| 8 | はじまりの音; Hajimari no Oto | September 24, 2015 | 9784041030011 |
| 9 | 狼の時間; Ōkami no Jikan | January 23, 2016 | 9784041030042 |
| 10 | 八月のまぼろし; Hachigatsu no Maboroshi | July 23, 2016 | 9784041030066 |
| 11 | 蝶の足跡; Chō no Ashiato | March 25, 2017 | 9784041052020 |
| 12 | ジュリエットの告白; Jūrietto no Kokuhaku | August 25, 2017 | 9784041052044 |
| 13 | わたしのおうちはどこですか; Watashi no Ouchi wa Doko Desu ka | October 25, 2017 | 9784041062500 |
| 14 | キムンカムイの花嫁; Kimun Kamui no Hanayome | September 22, 2018 | 9784041074176 |
| 15 | わたしを殺したお人形; Watashi no Koroshita Oningyō | December 24, 2019 | 9784041080535 |
| 16 | 蝶は聖夜に羽ばたく; Chō wa Seiya ni Habataku | September 24, 2020 | 9784041098776 |
| 17 | 櫻花の葬送; Sakurabana no Sōsō | March 24, 2021 | 9784041111499 |
| 18 | Side Case Summer - | May 24, 2022 | 9784041125601 |

=== Anime ===
An anime adaptation by Troyca aired in Japan between October 7, 2015, and December 23, 2015, and was simulcast by Crunchyroll. The opening theme is "Dear Answer" performed by True while the ending theme is "Uchiyoserareta Bōkyaku no Zankyō ni" (打ち寄せられた忘却の残響に, The Reverberation of a Washed Up Oblivion) by Technoboys Pullcraft Green-Fund feat. Yuki Ootake. Sentai Filmworks licensed the series for home video release in North America.

==== Episode list ====
| No. | Title | Original release date |
|---|---|---|
| 1 | "The Princess Who Loves Bones" "Hone Mezuru Himegimi" (Japanese: 骨愛ずる姫君) | October 7, 2015 |
High school student Shōtarō Tatewaki heads out of town with the eccentric osteologist Sakurako Kujō, who promises to buy him shrimp from the village. While digging around for bones, Shōtarō ends up uncovering a human skull with a bashed-in frontal bone with an almost entirely intact Sphenoid bone. Against Sakurako's wishes, he calls the police, though she uses circumstantial evidence to prove that the skull is actually from around a century old. As the policeman escorts the two to the station, he lets slip a "lovers" double-suicide that also happened in the same village, and Sakurako begs him to let her see the bodies. While the local detective is quick to pronounce the cause of death as a lovers' suicide, Sakurako points out that the knot tied around the wrists and the lack of fluid inside the bodies prove that it was a homicide someone wanted to disguise as a suicide by the ocean. Despite her hard work, Shōtarō catches Sakurako trying to sneak the original skull out of the police station, and makes her leave it on the way back home.
| 2 | "Where Do You Live?" "Anata no Ouchi wa Doko desu ka" (Japanese: 貴方のお家はどこですか) | October 14, 2015 |
While buying food from a nearby convenience store late at night, Shōtarō spots a 4-year-old girl named Ii-chan wandering around, covered in blood. After calling the police, Shōtarō takes her to Sakurako, who deduces that she was abused and had a broken arm once. Shōtarō gets closer to the location when his classmate Yuriko, who babysat for her, tells him where to find the house. Shōtarō and Sakurako enter the house to find the dead body of the girl's mother, and deduce that someone she knew killed her, but are unsure why she let herself be stabbed in the kitchen. Sakurako finds a crawlspace underneath the mother's body, where the girl's baby brother lies unconscious. Sakurako performs CPR on the baby when the attacker, the father of the family, comes back to the house. After stabbing the policeman with a knife, he enters the house where Shōtarō manages to subdue him, but Sakurako screams out the name "Soutarou" after being afraid of his safety. As the police take the father into custody and the baby returns to consciousness, Shōtarō wonders if Sakurako cared about him or someone else.
| 3 | "The Bones that Slumber in Summer" "Natsu ni Nemuru Hone" (Japanese: 夏に眠る骨) | October 21, 2015 |
Sakurako drags Shōtarō to a game trail at a nature park with the promise of tasty watermelon. A couple of backpackers stumble upon a dead body, and Sakurako immediately rushes to study it while Shōtarō calls the police. After Sakurakou deduces that the death was several months old and could not have been a suicide judging by a break in the spine, she later explains to Shōtarō that the Soutarou she mentioned was her younger brother who died long ago. The next day, Yuriko approaches Shōtarō, revealing that the bones he found belonged to her grandmother, who the police believe committed suicide. The grandmother had been taking care of her grandfather, who was a good painter but had also gone senile and needed constant care at home. The next day, Sakurako returns to the cliff with Shōtarō and his classmate to prove that the grandmother did not commit suicide, but that she had gone for a walk to view the sunrise from a high point, having only fallen by accident. Though saddened, the girl is glad to know that her grandmother didn't kill herself or willingly abandon her own grandfather.
| 4 | "The Cursed Man, Part 1" "Norowareta Otoko Zenpen" (Japanese: 呪われた男 前編) | October 28, 2015 |
Sakurako and Shōtarō are asked by Utsumi to help his friend Takeshi Fujioka, who believes himself to be cursed, as all the men in his family live short lives, and also possesses a supposedly cursed dog, whose owners had all died. As the three meet up with Takeshi and his family, including his pet dog Hector, Fujioka remains insistent that what happened to his predecessors will happen to him as well. While Takeshi goes out to meet with a mysterious person, his wife Miyuki tells the others about a cursed painting he also inherited. After looking over Takeshi's family history herself, Sakurako deduces that his curse has something to do with the supposed cursed painting.
| 5 | "The Cursed Man, Part 2" "Norowareta Otoko Kōhen" (Japanese: 呪われた男 後編) | November 4, 2015 |
Sakurako discovers the painting Takeshi had kept in his study was painted with a pigment containing arsenic which, when combined with the mold that had grown from being kept in storage, had been releasing a deadly gas. She further deduces that the death of the other men in Takeshi's family was due to stress causing an abnormality in their coronary arteries. Just as the others seem to breathe a sigh of relief, Sakurako senses something is amiss about why Takeshi chose now to contact Utsumi. Finding Takeshi outside with his leg cut by an axe, Sakurako deduces that he had tried to commit suicide in a way that would look like an accident in order to escape his debt, though Miyuki yells at him that money is less important than family. With the ambulance delayed by an illegally parked vehicle, Utsumi carries Takeshi the rest of the way, allowing him to make it safely. Afterwards, as Sakurako takes Hector in with her, she becomes curious about the mysterious person who appraised Takeshi's painting.
| 6 | "Asahi Bridge Irregulars" "Asahi Burijji Iregyurāzu" (Japanese: アサヒ・ブリッジ・イレギュラーズ) | November 11, 2015 |
On her way to a summer festival, Yuriko spots a mysterious woman on a bridge who suddenly disappears, leaving behind an envelope containing a diamond ring and what looks like a suicide note. After going over the contents with her teacher, Itsuki Isozaki, Yuriko, fearing for the woman's safety, decides to search for her with help from Utsumi and a reluctant Isozaki. She soon comes across Sakurako, who deduces that the woman's ring is mourning jewellery made from her late husband's bones, which she sought to send off to the afterlife after finding a new partner.
| 7 | "The Entrusted Bones, Part 1" "Takusareta Hone Zenpen" (Japanese: 託された骨 前編) | November 18, 2015 |
Sakurako comes to Shōtarō's school for their culture festival, with Shōtarō's class running a maid café. After voicing some complaints about the animal skeletons set up in the lab, Sakurako is asked by Isozaki to sort through some bones in the science prep room. While doing so, Sakurako explains how she made her first specimen from her dead cat, her indifference to which doesn't settle well with Shōtarō. They soon come across a chest containing cremated human bones, belonging to a girl named Natsuko Sono who was close to the old science teacher Atsurou Sasaki. The next day, after the police go through the discovered bones, Shōtarō discovers a bunch of cat bones have gone missing, suspecting Sakurako. Meanwhile, Sakurako visits a hospitalized professor named Shitara Masamichi and decides to investigate an unsolved case.
| 8 | "The Entrusted Bones, Part 2" "Takusareta Hone Kōhen" (Japanese: 託された骨 後編) | November 25, 2015 |
Shōtarō and Sakurako deliver Sasaki's belongings to his sister, Sayuki Haruma, who explains how Natsuko was her caregiver and close friend to her and Sasaki. After Natsuko had a premature birth, resulting in the death of her child, she left the household and died a few years later, with her bones accepted by Sayuki. As Shōtarō hides a photograph, Sakurako follows clues leading her to where the baby's bones were buried, which also contains one of Natsuko's bones that Sasaki had put in with them. Returning the bones to Sayuki, Sakurako deduces from the shape of the toe bones that Sayuki is the baby's actual mother. After understanding the full story, Shōtarō goes back to return the photo to Sayuki, who deduces the poem on the back was a farewell message from Natsuko. The next day, Shōtarō confronts Sakurako about the stolen cat bones, deducing they were from another cat she owned and was a former alumni at his school. Sakurako confirms this, explaining how she brought both her cats, who died of poisoning, to Sasaki, who made them into skeletons and taught her all about osteology.
| 9 | "Grandmother's Pudding" "Obāchan no Purin" (Japanese: お祖母ちゃんのプリン) | December 2, 2015 |
Yuriko recalls her grandmother wanting to give her a painting when she got married and asks Sakurako to look through her personal effects to see which one it could be. After looking over the three paintings, finding meaning in each of them, Sakurako decides she is unable to find the true painting in question, believing it to be a mystery only Yuriko can solve. The next day, Shōtarō shares some pudding with Sakurako and her caretaker, Ume Sawa, lamenting over his own grandmother who died of cancer. As Shōtarō becomes curious as to why she always requested a specific brand of pudding, Ume deduces that it was to buy time for painkillers to kick in so that his hospital visits could be peaceful ones.
| 10 | "The Butterfly Vanished in November, Part 1" "Chō wa Ju-ichi-gatsu ni Kieta Zenpen" (Japanese: 蝶は十一月に消えた 前編) | December 9, 2015 |
Sakurako and Shōtarō accompany Isozaki after he learns that one of his former students, Hitoe Madoka, has gone missing. After looking through Hitoe's room and getting some additional clues from Yuriko, the group investigate the residence of Hitoe's friend, Minami, where they find a painting similar to one found in Hitoe's room. Finding Minami, who came to detest Hitoe for allegedly stealing away the painter she admired, Hanabusa, Sakurako takes her back to her place to give her a proper meal, unaware of the peculiar markings on her back.
| 11 | "The Butterfly Vanished in November, Part 2" "Chō wa Ju-ichi-gatsu ni Kieta Kōhen" (Japanese: 蝶は十一月に消えた 後編) | December 16, 2015 |
Minami leads Sakurako and the others to a wooden lodge where Hitoe is believed to be hiding. There, they find not only Hitoe, who is still alive following a suicide attempt, but also the bones of Hitoe and Minami's friend, Futaba Nishizawa, who Minami reveals was buried there after she allegedly hung herself. Uncovering Futaba's skull, Sakurako reveals that Futaba didn't hang herself, but was in fact strangled to death by Hitoe, who felt she was going to be killed by her. As Sakurako discovers the sphenoid bone removed from the skull, deducing it to be the work of Hanabusa, Minami, angered by her words, attempts to stab Sakurako, but Shōtarō steps in to take the hit for her. Although Shōtarō makes it out okay, Sakurako, deducing that Hanabusa is the man behind many of their recent incidents, tells him to break off all contact with her so as to not get into further danger.
| 12 | "Under Sakurako-san's Feet..." "Sakurako-san no Ashimoto ni wa..." (Japanese: 櫻子さんの足下には...) | December 23, 2015 |
Having had no contact Sakurako for a while, Shōtarō recalls how he first met Sakurako two years ago. While looking into the disappearance of one of his neighbors, Yachi, Shōtarō became introduced to Sakurako's love of bones and received her help in finding where Yachi went and what she was searching for. Finding the bones of Yachi's father, Sakurako deduced that Yachi was the one who killed him when she was young, which she had always regretted. Remembering the impact that incident had on him, Shōtarō rushes over to see Sakurako, stating his determination to remain by her side and help her face Hanabusa.

=== Live-action series ===
A live-action television series adaptation of the manga series was announced on February 24, 2017. The series was co-directed by Yūichi Satō and Daisuke Yamauchi, and written by Junpei Yamaoka, with music composed by Yugo Kanno. It premiered on Fuji TV on April 23, 2017, airing every Sunday at 9:00 pm for 10 episodes.

== Reception ==
Nicole MacLean, writing for THEM Anime Reviews, was highly positive towards Sakurako Kujo and her expertise in osteology, commended the side characters and one-off episodes for being enjoyable, but was critical of the overarching plot feeling forced and lacking substance regarding Sakurako's antagonist. Paul Jensen of Anime News Network praised the stories for their "calmer, quieter musings on life and death," felt that Sakurako's idiosyncrasies weren't presented well, and was critical of the writing leaning towards "forced drama and overwrought moral philosophy" when murder is involved and offering little information for its potential overarching villain. He concluded that: "There's some decent material in here, and it's good enough to justify a single viewing if you enjoy mystery shows [...] As it stands, I don't think it's compelling enough to win over a wider audience."
