= Troyca =

Japanese animation studio

Troyca Inc.
- Logo since May 23, 2021
- Native name: 株式会社トロイカ
- Romanized name: Kabushiki-gaisha Toroika
- Type: Kabushiki gaisha
- Industry: Japanese animation
- Founded: May 2013
- Founder: Ei Aoki; Toshiyuki Nagano; Tomonori Katou
- Headquarters: Shakujiimachi, Nerima, Tokyo, Japan
- Key people: Toshiyuki Nagano (Note: President and CEO); Tomonori Katou (Note: Executive vice-president); Ei Aoki (Note: Director)
- Number of employees: 61
- Website: troyca.co.jp

Troyca Inc. (Japanese: 株式会社トロイカ, Hepburn: Kabushiki-gaisha Toroika; stylized TROYCA) (from Russian: тройка – troika, "team of three") is a Japanese animation studio founded by former AIC producer Toshiyuki Nagano, photography director Tomonori Katou, and anime director Ei Aoki in May 2013.

== Works ==
=== Television series ===
Title	Director(s)	First run start date	First run end date	Eps	Note(s)	Ref(s)
Aldnoah.Zero	Ei Aoki	July 5, 2014	March 28, 2015	24	Original work. Co-production with A-1 Pictures.	
Beautiful Bones: Sakurako's Investigation	Makoto Katō	October 7, 2015	December 23, 2015	12	Based on a light novel series by Shiori Ōta.	
Re:Creators	Ei Aoki	April 8, 2017	September 16, 2017	22	Original work.	
Idolish7	Makoto Bessho	January 7, 2018	May 19, 2018	17	Based on a rhythm game by Bandai Namco Online.	
Bloom Into You	Makoto Katō	October 5, 2018	December 28, 2018	13	Based on a manga series by Nio Nakatani.	
The Case Files of Lord El-Melloi II: Rail Zeppelin Grace Note	Makoto Katō	July 6, 2019	September 28, 2019	13	Based on a light novel series by Makoto Sanda.	
Idolish7: Second Beat!	Makoto Bessho	April 5, 2020	December 27, 2020	15	Sequel to Idolish7.	
Idolish7: Third Beat!	Makoto Bessho	July 4, 2021	February 26, 2023	30	Sequel to Idolish7: Second Beat!	
Shinobi no Ittoki	Shuu Watanabe	October 4, 2022	December 20, 2022	12	Original work.	
Overtake!	Ei Aoki	October 1, 2023	December 17, 2023	12	Original work.	
Atri: My Dear Moments	Makoto Katō	July 14, 2024	October 5, 2024	13	Based on a visual novel by Aniplex.exe.	
The Too-Perfect Saint: Tossed Aside by My Fiancé and Sold to Another Kingdom	Shuu Watanabe	April 10, 2025	June 26, 2025	12	Based on a light novel series by Kōki Fuyutsuki.	
Dark Moon: The Blood Altar	Shōko Shiga	January 10, 2026	March 28, 2026	12	Based on a manhwa by HYBE.	
Always a Catch!	Akira Oguro	April 2, 2026	June 28, 2026	12	Based on a light novel series by Mayo Momoyo.	
Iron Wok Jan	Ei Aoki	July 5, 2026	September 20, 2026	12	Based on a manga series by Shinji Saijyo.	
Bride of the Barrier Master	Tōru Kitahata	January 6, 2027	TBA	TBA	Based on a light novel series by Kureha.	
The Remarried Empress	Tetsuya Yanagisawa	2027	TBA	TBA	Based on a web novel series by Alphatart.	

=== OVAs/ONAs ===
Title	Director(s)	First run start date	First run end date	Eps	Note(s)	Ref(s)
IDOLiSH7: Vibrato	Makoto Bessho	February 16, 2018	March 7, 2019	8	Spin-off of IDOLiSH7	
