= Idolish7 =

Japanese media franchise

- Key visual for the anime adaptation

アイドリッシュセブン (Aidorisshu Sebun)
- Genre: Musical
- Created by: Bandai Namco Entertainment; Bunta Tsushimi
- Video game
- Developer: G2studios
- Publisher: Bandai Namco Online (2015–2025), Bandai Namco Entertainment (2025–present)
- Genre: Rhythm game
- Platform: iOS, Android
- Released: JP: August 20, 2015
- Manga
- Written by: Nokoshi Yamada
- Published by: Hakusensha
- Magazine: Hana LaLa Online
- Original run: 2015 – 2019
- Volumes: 7
- Manga

TRIGGER: Before the Radiant Glory
- Written by: Bunta Tsushimi
- Illustrated by: Arina Tanemura
- Published by: Hakusensha
- Original run: 2016 – present
- Manga

Ryūsei ni Inoru
- Written by: Bunta Tsushimi
- Illustrated by: Arina Tanemura
- Published by: Hakusensha
- Original run: 2017 – 2018
- Volumes: 2
- Manga

Re:member
- Written by: Bunta Tsushimi
- Illustrated by: Arina Tanemura
- Published by: Hakusensha
- Original run: 2018 – 2019
- Volumes: 3
- Anime television series
- Directed by: Makoto Bessho
- Written by: Ayumi Sekine
- Music by: Tatsuya Kato
- Studio: Troyca
- Licensed by: Crunchyroll; SEA: Mighty Media
- Original network: Tokyo MX, KBS, SUN, TVA, TVh, TVQ, BS11
- Original run: December 31, 2017 – May 19, 2018
- Episodes: 17
- Original net animation

Vibrato
- Directed by: Makoto Bessho
- Written by: Ayumi Sekine
- Music by: Tatsuya Kato
- Studio: Troyca
- Licensed by: YouTube Premium (USA)
- Released: February 16, 2018 – March 7, 2019
- Episodes: 8
- Anime television series

Second Beat!
- Directed by: Makoto Bessho
- Written by: Ayumi Sekine
- Music by: Tatsuya Kato
- Studio: Troyca
- Licensed by: Crunchyroll
- Original network: Tokyo MX, KBS, SUN, TVA, TVh, TVQ, BS11
- Original run: April 5, 2020 – December 27, 2020
- Episodes: 15
- Anime television series

Third Beat!
- Directed by: Makoto Bessho
- Written by: Ayumi Sekine
- Music by: Tatsuya Kato
- Studio: Troyca
- Licensed by: Crunchyroll
- Original network: Tokyo MX, SUN, KBS, TVA, TVh, TVQ, BS11
- Original run: July 4, 2021 – February 26, 2023
- Episodes: 30
- Anime film

Live 4bit Beyond the Period
- Directed by: Hiroshi Nishikiori; Kensuke Yamamoto
- Written by: Bunta Tsushimi
- Music by: Lantis
- Studio: Orange
- Licensed by: Crunchyroll
- Released: May 20, 2023
- Runtime: 93 minutes
- Anime film

First Beat! Gekijō Sōshūhen
- Directed by: Makoto Bessho
- Written by: Ayumi Sekine
- Music by: Tatsuya Kato
- Studio: Troyca
- Released: October 3, 2025 – present

Idolish7 (アイドリッシュセブン, Aidorisshu Sebun; stylized as IDOLiSH7) is a Japanese rhythm game developed by G2Studios and published by Bandai Namco Entertainment with music collaboration by Lantis for Android and iOS platforms, which first released in Japan on August 20, 2015. The project features character design by Arina Tanemura. Idolish7 has spawned several manga adaptations and novelizations. An anime television series adaptation by Troyca aired from January to May 2018, and a second season aired from April to December 2020. A third season aired from July 2021 to February 2023. A fourth season has been announced. The album Regality connected to the series became the first album credited to a male in-story character group to top the weekly Oricon Albums Chart.

== Plot ==
The player assumes the role of Tsumugi Takanashi, an inexperienced manager for a new idol group under her father's small agency. The idol group is named "Idolish7," and consists of seven male members, each with their own unique personality and background. She must train and turn all of them into famous idols, all while struggling against the hardships of the entertainment industry.

== Characters ==
=== Idolish7 ===
A new idol group belonging to Takanashi Production Company. Their names contain the numbers 1 through 7 in kanji. Their music symbols mainly consist of accidentals and dynamics.

Iori Izumi (和泉 一織, Izumi Iori)
Voiced by: Toshiki Masuda
The rational and brilliant member of the group. Calm and polite, he can complete any task flawlessly but is actually fairly sharp-tongued when he talks. He acts as a secret, second manager for the group as he advises Tsumugi on what he believes is best for the group. He originally became an idol to help fulfill his brother Mitsuki's dream, but begins to really enjoy the work and people around him. He is still in high school and attends the same school as Tamaki. It is shown that he loves cute things, but will never admit that. He is 17 years old. His music symbol is a double flat and he represents the number one.
Yamato Nikaidō (二階堂 大和, Nikaidō Yamato)
Voiced by: Yusuke Shirai
The eldest member of the group and a big brother figure to the other members. He is Idolish7's leader and is regarded as their "acting genius" with multiple people praising his skills. Although Yamato seems to have an aloof personality, he is passionate inside and thinks about the other members of the group more than anyone else. He claims to hate the entertainment industry and only entered it to "get revenge" on someone, but has since abandoned that motive after he sees how hard everyone works. Despite this, he is shown to be keeping a secret. He is 22 years old. His music symbol is a sharp and he represents the number two.
Mitsuki Izumi (和泉 三月, Izumi Mitsuki)
Voiced by: Tsubasa Yonaga
The energetic member of the group who always sets the mood and Iori's older brother. He is caring and has a chivalrous spirit. His dream is to become as big and inspirational as the legendary idol 'Zero'. He originally failed auditions multiple times before he was accepted in Takanashi Productions, which caused him to be insecure sometimes, but eventually learned what his special skills are (emceeing and comedy) and how he fits in to the group. He has a height complex as he is the shortest member in the group. He is 21 years old. His music symbol is a flat and he represents the number three.
Tamaki Yotsuba (四葉 環, Yotsuba Tamaki)
Voiced by: Kenn
The dancing genius of the group, he has great reflexes and has a dancing level equivalent to professionals. Tamaki is shown to be quite emotionally driven and aggressive, but always has good intentions. He moves at his own pace, and is just a little bit loose when it comes to being on time and keeping promises. He attends the same high school as Iori and often has to be dragged there by him. He grew up in an orphanage after his father abandoned their family and his mother died of an illness. While at the orphanage, his younger sister Aya was fostered and therefore he lost touch with her. He became an idol in order to find Aya as idols are on TV or radio often so she knew where to find him. Due to growing up poor, he has a love for King Pudding, which can be used to win him over quite easily. He is part of the sub-unit, Mezzo, along with Sogo. He is 17 years old. His music symbol is mezzo piano and he represents the number four.
Sōgo Ōsaka (逢坂 壮五, Ōsaka Sōgo)
Voiced by: Atsushi Abe
The "all-rounder" member who is able to handle any song and dance with no problem. He is kind, selfless and reserved to everyone, but is the scariest member when angered. His selfless nature however has caused him to have difficulties expressing his emotions and his concerns when he begins to have a difficult time. He grew up in a wealthier family who disapproved of his love for music with the exception of his late uncle who inspired him to follow his dream of becoming an idol. Due to his rebellion, he is shown to have a strained relationship with his family. He and Tamaki form the sub-unit, Mezzo. He is 20 years old. His music symbol is mezzo forte and he represents the number five.
Nagi Rokuya (六弥ナギ, Rokuya Nagi)
Voiced by: Takuya Eguchi
The visual member of the group who speaks in broken Japanese. He is half- Japanese and half Northmeran (a fictional northern European country). He decides to move from Northmare to Japan after he fell in love with Japanese pop culture, especially anime, with his favorite being Mahō Shōjo Magical Kokona. He is fully confident in his looks, has a lot of charisma, and has a habit of immediately hitting on any girl he sees. Due to this habit, he has trouble making friends with others and deeply cares about the other members as they are his first friends. Despite his seemingly ditzy personality, he actually is intelligent as he can speak eight languages and has a vast knowledge about political topics. He is 19 years old. His music symbol is a natural and he represents the number six.
Riku Nanase (七瀬 陸, Nanase Riku)
Voiced by: Kensho Ono
Riku is the center of the group who is regarded as their "secret weapon". He is innocent and energetic, but quite naive on how the world actually works resulting in him being a bit of a pushover. He is very direct with how he is feeling and can be insensitive at times as he is unable to read how the others around him are feeling, but is always there to help others. He has an unknown respiratory disease that has left him hospitalized for most of his life and prevents him from doing anything that is too physically intense. Despite this, he does not allow his illness to stop him and works very hard to become a top idol. It is revealed that he is the twin brother of Tenn Kujo, who left the Nanase family five years ago. He originally became an idol to understand why his brother abandoned his family to enter this business. He is 18 years old. His music symbol is a double sharp and he represents the number seven.

=== Trigger ===
The rival group of Idolish7 that belongs to the Yaotome Production Company. Their names contain numbers 8 to 10 in kanji. Their music symbols mainly consist of clefs

Gaku Yaotome (八乙女 楽, Yaotome Gaku)
Voiced by: Wataru Hatano
A young man who is dubbed "Japan's Number One Most Desirable Man", Gaku is the leader of Trigger and holds great pride in his group. He is quite competitive and blunt when he speaks to others, but truly is very cordial and caring. He places a great emphasis on family believing it is the most important part of life which puts him at odds with those who do not care about family bonds. He is the son of Sosuke Yaotome, the president of Yaotome Productions, who groomed at a young age to become an idol. He is 22 years old. His music symbol is treble and he represents the number eight.
Tenn Kujō (九条 天, Kujō Ten)
Voiced by: Sōma Saitō
Ten is center of Trigger who is nicknamed "A Modern Day Angel". Off-stage, he is serious and cold towards others due to his perfectionist attitude and the great pride he takes in his work. He is shown not to want to inconvenience others and values the hard work of everyone around him which is why he maintains a high level of professionalism most of the time. However, Tenn truly is a kind and selfless person who cares deeply about the people around him. It is revealed that he is the twin brother of Riku Nanase and that he left his family five years ago to pursue his dream of being the greatest idol. Despite leaving the family, he secretly cares a great deal about his little brother and always thinks about his well-being. He is 18 years old. His music symbol is an alto and he represents the number nine.
Ryūnosuke Tsunashi (十 龍之介, Tsunashi Ryūnosuke)
Voiced by: Takuya Satō
Ryūnosuke is the last member of Trigger and the group's "big brother" figure. Born in Okinawa, he moved to Tokyo in order to become an idol to make enough money to put his younger siblings through college and pay off his father's debts. He is marketed to the public as wild and sexy with a playboy attitude. However, Ryunosuke is the exact opposite of this as he is caring and loyal..The gap between his true personality and his public image causes him to worry at times. He is shown to be the peacemaker when arguments break out. He is 23 years old. His music symbol is bass and he represents the number ten.

=== Re:vale ===
An idol group that introduced in the second chapter of the game. Their names contain numbers 100 and 1000 in kanji. Their music symbols mainly consist of repeat signs.

Momose Sunohara (春原 百瀬, Sunohara Momose)
Voiced by: Sōichirō Hoshi

Mostly known by his stage name of Momo (百), he is the energetic and easygoing member of Re:vale. He has a bit of a mischievous side and is shown to be very observant of his surroundings. According to Yuki, Momose is the kind of person who can make others happy just by being around. He wishes to protect the people dear to him in any way he can, often ignoring, however, the care and attention he needs himself. He is secretly insecure about his abilities, believing he is not worthy to be part of Re:vale, as he is not an original member. He is the boke of the pair, constantly making off the wall comments. His music symbol is the left repeat sign and he represents the number one hundred.

Yukito Orikasa (折笠 千斗, Orikasa Yukito)
Voiced by: Shinnosuke Tachibana

Mostly known by his stage name of Yuki (千), he is the co-founder of Re:vale as well as their songwriter. He has a cool and collected personality, but is often blunt which causes others to believe that he does not care. This is untrue as he is actually quite easygoing and looks after the younger groups, often giving them advice as well. Yuki is revealed to have been searching for his first partner for the past 5 years after he took a hit meant for Yuki and disappeared afterwards. Yuki is the tsukkomi of the pair, and follows through with interjecting Momo's Boke jokes. His music symbol is the right repeat sign and he represents the number one thousand.

=== Zool ===
An idol group introduced in the third chapter of the game. Their names contain kanji of animals from the Japanese zodiac—boar, dog, snake and tiger. Their music symbols mainly consist of musical notes with the theme of repetition and silence.

Haruka Isumi (亥清 悠, Isumi Haruka)
Voiced by: Yūya Hirose
Zool's center who transfers to the same class as Iori and Tamaki. He is shown to be self-centered and demanding, believing that everyone is inferior compared to him. However, they stem from his abandonment issues he has because his mentor abandoned him after he was deemed "unworthy" to become his adoptive son and his idol. In reality, he simply wishes to be an idol that everyone loves. His music symbol is Fermata and he represents the boar.
Tōma Inumaru (狗丸 トウマ, Inumaru Tōma)
Voiced by: Subaru Kimura
Zool's lead vocalist who used to be in another band called NO_MAD. He is shown to have a strong hate for popular idols and for fans of popular idols as his old band NO_MAD disbanded after his fans abandoned the group to move on to more popular idols. Over time, he realizes that he must work harder to earn the popularity the other groups have. He is seen to be quite aggressive and brash towards others. Despite his hate and personality, he is shown to be caring of his teammates and begins to value them more. His music symbol is Segno and he represents the dog.
Minami Natsume (棗 巳波, Natsume Minami)
Voiced by: Kōtarō Nishiyama
A former acting prodigy, he has starred in various older movies and dramas. He is the songwriter of the group and hides his snarky personality behind a kind face and smile. He often wishes to know what he can gain from a particular event and loves gathering intel on the more popular groups. Behind this, he is very passionate about the songs he writes and is often upset when he cannot come up with a song that satisfies him. He has a high level of professionalism and really just wants to show his talents to the world. He does fortune telling as a hobby and is revealed to have spent some time in Northmare, Nagi's home country. His music symbol is Release pedal and he represents the snake.
Torao Midō (御堂 虎於, Midō Torao)
Voiced by: Takashi Kondō
The son of a wealthy family, he had a fortunate life growing up as he was considered attractive and talented which boosted his ego. He holds a grudge against Ryunosuke Tsunashi for having a kind personality and a sexy image, something which many of his female partners told him about. This grows into hate for the entertainment industry and their fake personas and lies. However, he truly does wish to have fun with his teammates and with his work. His music symbol is Simile and he represents the tiger.

=== Takanashi Productions ===
Tsumugi Takanashi (小鳥遊 紡, Takanashi Tsumugi)
Voiced by: Satomi Satō (anime)
The main protagonist as well as Otoharu and the late Musubi's daughter. Her father gives her the position of Idolish7's manager, and works hard to try and sell them. She is a strong girl who is positive no matter what comes her way. In the game, the player assumes her role and can change her given name.
Otoharu Takanashi (小鳥遊 音晴, Takanashi Otoharu)
Voiced by: Susumu Chiba
The president of Takanashi Productions, the agency that Idolish7 is a part of. He is kind of spacey, but sincere when it comes to work, and watches over the new members of his agency. He has a past with Sosuke Yaotome as they both once fought over a girl named Musubi. Eventually Musubi married Otoharu, something which Sosuke could never get over.
Banri Ōgami (大神 万理, Ōgami Banri)
Voiced by: Kazuyuki Okitsu
A talented staff member with an unknown past who keeps the agency running. A reliable man, he supports the members of Idolish7, Tsumugi, their new manager, and all of Takanashi Productions. He was later revealed to be Yuki's previous band mate and the co-founder of Re:vale before an accident caused him to quit being an idol as seen in Idolish7: The Second Beat and in the manga "Re:member"
Kinako (きなこ)
Voiced by: Satomi Satō
A rabbit-like pet owned by Takanashi Productions. The pet is seen roaming the office and sometimes the dorm Idolish7 share. It has also grown to be the mascot of Takanashi Productions.
Haruki Sakura (櫻 春樹, Sakura Haruki)
Voiced by: Tomokazu Seki
A composer of Takanashi Productions who used to compose for Zero. After Zero's disappearance he continued to compose songs and play them for Nagi, who he was friends with. He fell sick and, out of fear of inconveniencing Nagi, he disappeared leaving a note and all of the songs he composed to Nagi. Nagi ended up giving the songs to a company president Haruki had praised, Otoharu. Nagi later flew to Japan to see Otoharu and got scouted for Idolish7.

=== Others ===
Sōsuke Yaotome (八乙女 宗助, Yaotome Sōsuke)
Voiced by: Katsuyuki Konishi
The president of Yaotome Productions, which Trigger belongs to. It is relieved that he was once in love with Musubi Takanashi, Otoharu's late wife and Tsumugi's late mother. He was never able to get over his love for her and therefore never truly valued his ex-wife and son. Due to his hate towards Otoharu, he openly hates Takanashi Productions and Idolish7. Despite his power hungry schemes to make Trigger rise to fame and the outward dismissal he has at their suggestions, he cares about them.
Kaoru Anesagi (姉鷺 カオル, Anesagi Kaoru)
Voiced by: Yoshihisa Kawahara
Trigger's manager.
Akihito Hyūga (日向 アキヒト, Hyūga Akihito)
Voiced by: Junichi Yanagita
A Yaotome Productions composer.
Rinto Okazaki (岡崎 凜人, Okazaki Rinto)
Voiced by: Makoto Furukawa
Re:vale's manager.
Ryo Tsukumo (月雲 了, Tsukumo Ryo)
Voiced by: Hiroki Takahashi
Zool's manager.
Mr. Shimooka (ミスター下岡, Misutā Shimooka)
Voiced by: Wataru Takagi
A TV show host whose shows Idolish7 sometimes appears on.
Takamasa Kujō (九条 鷹匡, Kujō Takamasa)
Voiced by: Kenjirō Tsuda
Tenn's adoptive father and former manager of Zero. He is revealed to be very rich and wishes to use that money to recruit potential talents that can one day surpass the legendary Zero. He is shown to be manipulative on how he recruits his idols.
Zero
The most talked about legendary idol who disappeared 15 years ago. The reason behind his whereabouts remains to be seen.

== Development ==
Arina Tanemura, the game's character designer, created the characters based on information provided about their names, personalities, and theme colors. The first character she drafted was Yamato Nikaidō due to his glasses being the most distinguishable character trait and gave him short sleeves to reflect his cheerful personality. In contrast, Iori Izumi was given long sleeves because of his cool personality. Tanemura had initially drawn Iori and Mitsuki with the same hair color due to them being siblings, but a representative from Bandai Namco Entertainment had allowed her to make an exception. Bandai Namco Entertainment had also envisioned Mitsuki to be a youthful-looking character. Tanemura had misread that Tamaki was intended to be the shortest and most youthful character, instead submitting a more mature design; this resulted in Bandai Namco Entertainment accepting the draft and revising his personality to fit the design. Sōgō was intended as the group's yandere character, and while Tanemura had difficulty incorporating that into the design, she later drew him with a thin physique to reflect a "sickly" nature. Nagi was drawn with a "pretty physique" due to his half-Scandinavian ancestry. Riku was originally drawn with black hair before Tanemura revised his hair color to be lighter, and his costume was the most revealing because he was the center of the group. Whereas Idolish7 was designed with a white color theme, Trigger was designed with a black color theme for contrast.

== Discography ==
=== Studio albums ===
List of albums, with selected chart positions, sales figures and certifications
Title	Year	Album details	Peak chart positions		Sales	Certifications
Title	Year	Album details	JPN Oricon	JPN Hot	Sales	Certifications
IDOLiSH7
i7	2016	Released: August 24, 2016; Label: Lantis; Formats: CD, digital download	2	2	JPN: 58,519	—N/a
Opus	2022	Released: January 12, 2022; Label: Lantis; Formats: CD, digital download	5	5	JPN: 24,357	—N/a
Leading Tone	2024	Released: November 20, 2024; Label: Lantis; Formats: CD, digital download	7	8	JPN: 11,077	—N/a
TRIGGER
Regality	2017	Released: September 20, 2017; Label: Lantis; Formats: CD, digital download	1	1	JPN: 39,129	—N/a
Variant	2021	Released: June 23, 2021; Lantis; Formats: CD, digital download	4	4	JPN: 33,088	—N/a
Trois	2025	Released: March 12, 2025; Lantis; Formats: CD, digital download	10	4	-	—N/a
Re:vale
Re:al Axis	2018	Released: December 5, 2018; Label: Lantis; Formats: CD, digital download	4	4	JPN: 30,597	—N/a
Re:flect In	2022	Released: August 3, 2022; Label: Lantis; Formats: CD, digital download	6	6	JPN: 28,094	—N/a
ŹOOĻ
einsatŹ	2020	Released: November 25, 2020; Label: Lantis; Formats: CD, digital download	7	5	JPN: 23,264	—N/a
Źquare	2023	Released: December 06, 2023; Label: Lantis; Formats: CD, digital download			—	—N/a
MEZZO"
Intermezzo	2021	Released: October 20, 2021; Label: Lantis; Formats: CD, digital download	3	2	JPN: 33,640	—N/a
Tatsuya Kato
IDOLiSH7 Original Soundtrack: SOUND OF RAiNBOW	2018	Released: April 25, 2018; Label: Lantis; Formats: CD, digital download	37	59	JPN: 2,263	—N/a
IDOLiSH7 Second BEAT! Original Soundtrack: BEYOND THE SHiNE	2021	Released: January 21, 2021; Label: Lantis; Formats: CD, digital download	23	20	—	—N/a
Idolish7 Third BEAT! Original Soundtrack: UNTOUCHED PRiDE	2023	Released: March 1, 2023; Label: Lantis; Formats: CD	6	—	JPN: 9,361	—N/a
"—" denotes releases that did not chart or were not released in that region.

=== Singles ===
List of singles, with selected chart positions, sales figures and certifications
Title	Year	Peak chart positions			Sales	Album
Title	Year	JPN	JPN Hot	JPN Ani.	Sales	Album
IDOLiSH7
"MONSTER GENERATiON"	2015	7	25	5	—	i7
"Natsu Shiyōze!" (NATSU☆しようぜ!) (lit. Let's Enjoy Summer!)	2016	4	3	1	JPN: 24,249	Regality
"Sakura Message"	2017	8	14	3	JPN: 12,840	Non-album single
"WiSH VOYAGE"	2018	5 (Note: "Wish Voyage" and "Dancing Beat!" were released physically as a double A-side single. The sales count and Oricon ranking reflects both songs combined.)	11	3	JPN: 33,374	Non-album single
"Dancing Beat!"	2018	5	85	—	JPN: 33,374	Non-album single
"Nanatsu-iro Realize" (ナナツイロ REALiZE) (lit. Rainbow Realize)	2018	9	12	2	JPN: 12,300	Non-album single
"Mr. AFFECTiON"	2020	3	13	4	JPN: 13,101	Non-album single
"DiSCOVER THE FUTURE"	2020					
"THE POLiCY"	2021					
"Marou Buruu"(マロウブルー)(lit. Mallow Blue)	2022					
"WONDER LiGHT"	2022					
TRIGGER
"SECRET NIGHT"	2015	5	19	3	—	Regality
"Heavenly Visitor"	2018	9 (Note: "Heavenly Visitor" and "Diamond Fusion" were released physically as a double A-side single. The sales count and Oricon ranking reflect both songs combined.)	14	4	JPN: 20,651	Non-album single
"Diamond Fusion"	2018	9	67	16	JPN: 20,651	Non-album single
"Crescent Rise"	2020	4	13	3	JPN: 16,559	Non-album single
"PLACES"	2021					
"SUISAI"	2022					
Re:vale
"SILVER SKY"	2016					
"NO DOUBT"	2018					
"Mirai Notes wo kanadete" (ミライノーツを奏でて) (lit. Playing the Notes of the Future)	2020					
"Kokoro Harebare" (ココロ、ハレ晴レ) (lit. Bright Heart)	2022					
MEZZO"
"Koi no Kakera" (恋のかけら) (lit. Pieces of Love)	2016	11	8	4	JPN: 20,871	Non-album single
"Dear Butterfly"	2017	12	18	6	JPN: 10,785	Non-album single
"Ame" (雨) (lit. Rain)	2018	9	11	3	JPN: 15,829	Non-album single
"Karafuru" (カラフル) (lit. Colorful)	2022					
"Kizuna" (キズナ)	2023					
ŹOOĻ
"Poisonous Gangster"	2017	24	56	11	JPN: 4,662	Non-album single
"Bang! Bang! Bang!"	2020	9	31	5	JPN: 14,455	Non-album single
"Survivor"	2022					
"IMPERIAL CHAIN"	2022					
"Źenit - EP"	2022					
"—" denotes releases that did not chart or were not released in that region.

=== Other charted songs ===
Title	Year	Peak chart positions		Sales	Album
Title	Year	JPN Hot	JPN Ani	Sales	Album
Trigger
"In the Meantime"	2017	93	12	—	Regality
"—" denotes releases that did not chart or were not released in that region.

== Other media ==
=== Printed media ===
The project has released several manga and novel adaptations. A manga adaptation is drawn by Nokoshi Yamada and is serialized in Hakusensha's Hana LaLa Online since 2015. The first volume was released on December 4, 2015. Another manga that focuses on idol group rival of Idolish7, Trigger, is titled Idolish7: Trigger: Before The Radiant Glory (アイドリッシュセブン TRIGGER -before The Radiant Glory-). It is written by Bunta Tsushimi with illustrations by Arina Tanemura and was released on December 19, 2016. On October 12, 2017, it was announced that a new manga adaptation by Arina Tanemura titled Re:member, which centered around on the past of the group Re:vale. The manga launched on December 9.

A novel titled Idolish7: Ryūsei ni Inoru (アイドリッシュセブン 流星に祈る, Aidorisshu Sebun: Ryūsei ni Inoru) is written by Bunta Tsushimi with illustrations by Arina Tanemura. It was released on December 4, 2015. The novel received a manga adaptation of the same name, whose first volume released on August 4, 2017.

An official fanbook was released on June 30, 2016. The second fanbook was released on August 19, 2016.

=== Video games ===
Bandai Namco Entertainment released a tie-in console video game titled Idolish7 Twelve Fantasia! (アイドリッシュセブン Twelve Fantasia!) for the PlayStation Vita on February 15, 2018. The game's story takes place between the second and third story parts of the smartphone game, focusing on the Idolish7, Trigger, and Re:vale groups on a combined tour across Japan. The video game's final destination is a concert at Zero Arena.

=== Music videos ===
The music video for Trigger's third single, Crescent rise, was produced by Studio Trigger and released on January 27, 2020. It is part of a "Trigger × Trigger" collaboration project that was announced in September 2018.

=== Anime ===
An anime adaptation was first announced during a Niconico livestream event on August 19, 2016. The 17-episode anime premiered on December 31, 2017, and ended on May 19, 2018. Makoto Bessho is directing the anime at Troyca while Ayumi Sekine is supervising the anime's scripts. Kazumi Fukagawa is adapting Arina Tanemura's original designs for animation. Ei Aoki is credited as supervisor. Crunchyroll streamed the series as the anime simultaneously airs in Japan.

On July 7, 2018, Idolish7 was green-lit for a second season. The second season, titled Idolish7: Second Beat! aired from April 5 to December 27, 2020, with the cast and staff returning to reprise their roles. On April 13, 2020, it was announced that after the fourth episode, the remaining episodes of the season had been delayed due to the effect of the COVID-19 pandemic. On August 20, 2020, it was announced that the season will resume with the third episode on October 4, 2020.

On December 27, 2020, after the second season's finale, it was announced the series would be receiving a third season titled Idolish7: Third Beat!. The cast and staff are reprising their roles. The third season is a split-cour series, with the first half airing from July 4 to September 26, 2021. The second half aired from October 2, 2022, to February 26, 2023.

A fourth season of the series was announced during the 10th anniversary event for the franchise on January 25, 2025.

=== Film ===
A concert film titled Idolish The Movie Live 4bit Beyond the Pariod (劇場版アイドリッシュセブン LIVE 4bit BEYOND THE PERiOD) produced by Orange was announced on January 6, 2023. The film features two separate versions with different song lists, split into Day 1 and Day 2. The film premiered on May 20, 2023. In 2023, the film grossed 2.92 billion yen in Japan, ranking 10th in the highest grossing domestic films in Japan for the year. The separate Blu-ray discs for Day 1 and Day 2 were sold at theaters along with the movie release among other limited merchandise. Later, a box set with Blu-ray and DVD versions was released on December 22, 2023. However, the release of the "Nanairo Store Limited Edition Blu-ray BOX" was delayed until March 15, 2024, due to an unexpectedly high number of pre-orders.

The film was held during a special screening event on June 8 and 9, 2024, to commemorate the first anniversary of its release.

== Reception ==
In 2016, IDOLiSH7 was accused of plagiarizing artwork from several other idol-related mobile game series, more specifically The Idolmaster and Uta no Prince-sama, citing that several poses were traced or copied. Bandai Namco Online released a statement on September 9 through Idolish7's official website, stating a lawyer examined the images and concluded that there was no plagiarism involved. In addition, Bandai Namco Online also denied allegations that the character Tsumugi was a self-insert for the character designer, Arina Tanemura.

The anime won the Animage Anime Grand Prix award for best anime in the 2017 poll. IDOLiSH7: Second BEAT! won the fan-voted "Animation of the Year: Anime Fan Award" in the 2020 Tokyo Anime Award Festival. The first half of IDOLiSH7: Third BEAT! won the same award in the 2021 Tokyo Anime Award Festival. The Japanese review and survey firm Filmarks placed the first half of IDOLiSH7: Third BEAT! as #1 on the satisfaction ranking of summer 2021 anime, with an average rating of 4.52 out of 5.

The concert film's box office ranked at #5 for its first week and #6 for its second. The film earned over ¥409 million within its first nine days of release. The film ranked in the top ten weekend box office for twelve consecutive weeks and its final domestic box office grossed ¥3.26 billion. As of November 2, 2023, it is the fifth top-grossing Japanese anime film of 2023. The film won the fan-voted "Animation of the Year: Anime Fan Award" in the 2024 Tokyo Anime Award Festival.

== See also ==
- Promise of Wizard, an online simulation video game with Bunta Tsushimi serving as the main screenwriter of the game and author of its manga adaptations.
