= List of Ultraman Omega characters =

This is the character list of 2025 Ultra Series Ultraman Omega.

== KSCT Unit Uta ==
The Kaiju Special-Countermeasure Team (怪獣特別対策隊, Kaijū Tokubetsu Taisaku-tai), abbreviated as KSCT (怪特隊, Kaitokutai), is a special team that was formed to protect the public from monster appearances. It has headquarters in the Ministry of Disaster Defense (国土防災省, Kokudo Bōsai-shō) and nine teams stationed across Japan. Sorato, Kosei, and Ayumu later join the KSCT Unit Uta (ウタ班, Uta-han), officially known as the KSCT Special Task Unit (特務班, Tokumu-han), which is Sayuki Uta's own special operations team that is separate from the other nine teams. A year after Zomera's destruction, an international monster response organization known as the Kaiju Science Special Investigation Team (怪獣科学特別捜査隊, Kaijū Kagaku Tokubetsu Sōsa-tai), abbreviated as KSSIT, was established to work on coexisting with Earth monsters.

=== Sorato Okida ===
Sorato Okida (オオキダ ソラト, Ōkida Sorato) (Note: The names of the four characters are written in kanji as 大木田 宙人, 星見 光成, 一道 歩, and 宇多 咲幸, respectively.) (Note: Also spelt as Sorato Ohkida.) is an amnesiac man and the human identity of Ultraman Omega (ウルトラマンオメガ, Urutoraman Omega).

His true identity is originally one of the Space Gazers (宇宙観測隊, Uchū Kansoku-tai) who watch over planets with advanced civilizations to record everything from the birth to the death of the civilizations and seek to use those records to achieve true, unending peace. He intervenes on the moon when Genessians made their move to take the planet for themselves, eventually ended up with his current predicament after being defeated by Zovaras. While spending time as "Sorato" and eventually recruited into KSCT, Omega begins to warm up to mankind itself and saving them from countless attacks, both terrestrial monsters and extraterrestrial threats. After the revelation from Ahdel, Sorato regains his memories and eventually returns to his role as a Space Gazer, forcing him to reclaim his Meteokaiju from Kosei in the process. By the time Zomera's reign of terror reached the city, Sorato regains his actual resolve to defend humankind, absorbing Kosei as his human host and together defeating the chimeric monster. A year later, Sorato remains bonded to Kosei as another Space Gazer replaced him as Earth's watcher, thus allowing Omega to continue his duty as Earth's defender whilst humankind slowly finds a way to peacefully coexist with monsters.

Because of his role as a Space Gazer, Sorato has knowledge of terrestrial monsters that persisted even in his days spent as an amnesiac. As Ultraman Omega, Sorato transforms with the Omega Slugger (オメガスラッガー, Omega Suraggā) and the Omega Meteo (オメガメテオ, Omega Meteo) crystal. His finishing move is Reticulute Beam (レティクリュート光線, Retikuryūto Kōsen). His main weapon is a boomerang blade on his head, which has the same name as his transformation item.

Omega can harness the power of Meteokaiju through the use of their Ultra Meteos (ウルトラメテオ, Urutora Meteo).

- Rekiness Armor (レキネスアーマー, Rekinesu Āmā): A blue-colored armor that grants Omega the namesake monster's psychokinetic abilities and the Rekiness Caliber (レキネスカリバー, Rekinesu Karibā).
- Trigaron Armor (トライガロンアーマー, Toraigaron Āmā): A black-colored armor that grants Omega the namesake monster's strength, high speed, and the Trigalon Claw (トライガロンクロー, Toraigaron Kurō).
- Valgeness Armor (ヴァルジェネスアーマー, Varujenesu Āmā): A red-colored armor that grants Omega the namesake monster's elemental abilities and the Valgeness Halberd (ヴァルジェネスハルバード, Varujenesu Harubādo).

Sorato Okida is portrayed by Shori Kondo (近藤 頌利, Kondō Shōri).

=== Kosei Hoshimi ===
Kosei Hoshimi (ホシミ コウセイ, Hoshimi Kōsei) is a 21-year-old freeter who works part-time as a live-in warehouse caretaker. Originally a youth with no real plans for furthering his life, he was given his current job by Saburo Oya (オオヤ サブロウ, Ōya Saburō), the owner of the Taiyo Warehouse Company (太陽倉庫商会, Taiyō Sōko Shōkai), as a source of income.

He encounters and befriends Ultraman Omega and gives the alien his human name Sorato Okida. As Sorato continuously fights against the growing monster threats, Kosei gains the power to control Omega's recovered Meteokaiju. This allows Kosei to actively support Omega in battle by directing the Meteokaiju or allowing Omega to arm himself with his old monster companions. When Zomera threatened the city, Kosei's attempt to jumpstart the Kaen 102 to destroy the monster costed him his life, but Sorato/Omega made the compromise by absorbing Kosei as his human host, allowing Kosei to survive and transform into Ultraman Omega. A year after Zomera's destruction, he joins the KSSIT Tokyo branch as Ayumu's assistant, where Sorato remains in Kosei for his body's full recuperation while granted access to Omega's form and powers despite humankind's growing effort at peacefully coexisting with the native monsters.

Kosei Hoshimi is portrayed by Haruto Yoshida (吉田 晴登, Yoshida Haruto).

=== Ayumu Ichido ===
Ayumu Ichido (イチドウ アユム, Ichidō Ayumu) is a 27-year-old biologist who works for the National Center For Natural Research (国立自然研究センター, Kokuritsu Shizen Kenkyū Sentā). After their encounter, she works with Sorato and Kosei. Ayumu was initially oblivious to the two's pivotal role in Omega's fight against monsters, until the incident with Eldeghimera where the two would come clean to her and eventually since then working together as members of KSCT Unit Uta. A year after Zomera's destruction, she joins the KSSIT Tokyo branch.

Ayumu Ichido is portrayed by Ayano Kudo (工藤 綾乃, Kudō Ayano).

=== Sayuki Uta ===
Sayuki Uta (ウタ サユキ, Uta Sayuki) is a genius scientist who joined the KSCT as an advisor and leads its Unit Uta. A year after Zomera's destruction, she conducts research into direct communication with the Space Gazers.

Sayuki Uta is portrayed by Mirai Yamamoto (山本 未來, Yamamoto Mirai).

== Antagonists ==
=== Genessians ===
The Genessian (ゲネス人, Genesu-jin) are an unseen race of aliens from Planet Geness (ゲネス星, Genesu-sei) who fled their home planet after it was ravaged by monsters in the time of awakening (目覚めの刻, Mezame no Toki). With its ecosystem forever destroyed from the conflict, the Genssians built a space fortress on the Earth's Moon where they intend to invade the planet as their replacement home planet in the event when its own time of awakening reached as well. However, their actions caught the attention of Ultraman Omega as he destroys their facility and the guarding Vugsects before he fell to Earth as a result of Zovaras. The Genessians had since extinct, their essences live on in Zovaras.

- Ahdel (アーデル, Āderu; 22): A Genessian survivor and scientist who was responsible for creating Zovaras before he opposes his kind's plan to invade Earth. He was the first person to meet the amnesiac Omega's human form and gave him his clothes. Before he died, he left a holographic message for Sorato, telling him of his past and pleaded with the Ultra to abandon Earth and return to his prime directive as a Space Gazer. He is portrayed by Yukijirō Hotaru (螢 雪次朗, Hotaru Yukijirō).

=== Zovaras ===
Annihilative Genesis Being Zovaras (殲滅創世体 ゾヴァラス, Senmetsu Sōsei-tai Zovarasu) is an artificial being that was created by Ahdel and has the ability to manipulate monsters. Zovaras was first used in vain attempt to defend Planet Geness at the height of the day of the awakening, controlling one of the monsters against the other. However, the monsters continue to adapt and left Zovaras's effort at defending his planet in vain. Zovaras would join the rest of Genessians in their attempt at invading Earth, fighting against Omega and rendering the Ultra amnesiac after mind-controlling Valgneness to his bidding. Months later when Omega begins to adapt to the life of a human, Zovaras track him down to destroy him, but the combined efforts of KSCT had Valgeness restored to Omega's ownership, who in turn kills Zovaras with Valgeness Armor's Valgeness Halberd Quadrants.

In addition to his human form, Zovaras's mind control on Valgeness allows him to wield the Valgeness Halberd and gaining access to the monster's own elemental powers.

Zovaras is voiced by Kenta Nitta (新田 健太, Nitta Kenta), who also portrays his human form.

=== Zomera ===
Annihilative Proliferation Monster Zomera (殲滅細胞怪獣 ゾメラ, Senmetsu Saibō Kaijū Zomera; 23-25) is an artificial monster born from the fusion of Zovaras and Eldeghimera. Originally, NDF scientists within Ogasawara Islands try to study the cells of both Zovaras and Eldeghimera's Ghimera Cells. After both researches hit a wall, they try to combine both cells despite protests from Sayuki Uta, but the end result gave birth to Zomera by accident. Ultraman Omega initially intercept the chimeric monster, but was forced to retreat after it tries to brainwash Valgeness, forcing the Ultra to recall the monster at the last moment. Arriving on Japan, it faced against the combined might of NDF and KSCT trying to use the weaknesses of Eldeghimera and Zovaras, only for the monster to surpass it with its continuous growth in strength. Zomera was destroyed by Omega's Reticulute Beam.

Initially formed from Ghimera Cells and Zovaras's cells, it has the ability of both component monsters, such as Eldeghimera's predatory assimilation and Zovaras's monster brainwashing. Its power grow within each monster it devoured, to the point where it develops regenerative healing factor, Demaaga's pyrokinesis, Gairyuga's Light Wave Beam, and Gomora's Ultra Oscillation Wave.

== Other characters ==
=== Masaru Tange and Remi Sanagouchi ===
Masaru Tange (丹下 マサル, Tange Masaru) and Remi Sanagouchi (佐那河内 レミ, Sanagōchi Remi) are radio personalities.

Masaru Tange and Remi Saganouchi are voiced by Shunichi Maki (真木 駿一, Maki Shun'ichi) and Megumi Han (潘 めぐみ, Han Megumi).

=== Minor characters ===
- Nariaki Akaji (アカジ ナリアキ, Akaji Nariaki; SP2, SP3, SP4): The CEO of Japan Cyber Up Co. (ジャパンサイバーアップ株式会社, Japan Saibā Appu Kabushiki-gaisha), whose company situated above Kosei. Despite his preoccupied life, Nariaki often came in contact with the caretakers of Taiyo Warehouse, eventually the KSCT Unit Uta itself. He is portrayed by Tadashi Mizuno (水野 直, Mizuno Tadashi).
- Kazuyasu Taira (タイラ カズヤス, Taira Kazuyasu; 11, 12, 17, 23-25): An officer of the National Defense Force (国防隊, Kokubō-tai), abbreviated as NDF. He is portrayed by Seiya Osada (長田 成哉, Osada Seiya).

== Monsters and aliens ==
=== Earth monsters ===
The terrestrial monsters are natives to planet Earth, most of which awakened in response to the day of the awakening. Although then-amnesiac Sorato Okida often fights against the monsters, with occasional help from KSCT and Meteokaiju, his true mission wasn't to protect mankind itself but to continue observe their eventual role in fending off against monster assaults as part of his Space Gazer role.

- Burning Monster Graim (熱線怪獣 グライム, Nessen Kaijū Guraimu; 1, 11): A mole-like monster with a drilling nasal horn. The first Graim appeared and rampaged on Ohito City before it was killed by a singular slash from Omega's Omega Slugger as the amnesiac Ultra's first kill on Earth. A second Graim was consumed by Eldeghimera to obtain its nasal horn drill and heat ray ability.
- Poison Sea Lizard Dugrid (水棲毒獣 ドグリド, Suisei Doku-jū Dogurido; 2, 12, 22): An amphibious monster with toxic conjuring ability.
  - (2): The first Dugrid appears from Ibayashi River of Gunma Prefecture, where it was killed by Omega's Reticulute Beam.
  - (12): A second Dugrid was detected and observed under NCFNR, having awakened under Eldeghimera's presence. It was consumed by Eldeghimera to obtain its toxigenesis ability.
  - (22): A third Dugrid was awakened in the urban area as a result of reacting from Ahdel's recorder device. It was killed by Omega Rekiness Armor's Rekiness Caliber Continuous.
- Gravityless Monster Pegunos (無重力怪獣 ペグノス, Mujūryoku Kaijū Pegunosu; 3, 23): A penguin-like monster with zero gravity manipulation powers. It was killed by Omega's Reticulute Beam. A second Pegunos was killed by Gairyuga.
- Laser Claw Monster Therizirus (刃爪怪獣 テリジラス, Jinsō Kaijū Terijirasu; 4): A surviving member of the Therizinosaurus that eventually made its way to the present day as a monster. It was killed by Omega Rekiness Armor's Rekiness Caliber Continuous.
- Serpent Deity Beast Ohebinushi no Mikoto (伝説蛇獣 オオヘビヌシノミコト, Densetsu Ja-jū Ōhebinushi no Mikoto; 5): A snake-like monster with iron absorption capabilities. It was originally under the care of Miko Nishiki (ニシキ ミコ, Nishiki Miko) as her sole companion, but its presence slowly drains iron from her, causing iron deficiency through prolonged exposure. When Sorato and Kosei sensed the dangers it presented to Miko, Mikoto grows gigantic and was killed by a singular slash from Omega's Omega Slugger.
- Reckless Monster Gedrago (猛突怪獣 ゲドラゴ, Mōtotsu Kaijū Gedorago; 6): A pair of mole-like monsters, whose traits are based on the in-universe Long Mouth Dancing Moles. The female Gedrago died after overexposure to the Sun, while the male counterpart is buried back to the underground by Omega alongside the deceased female.
- Ancient Monster Gomora (古代怪獣 ゴモラ, Kodai Kaijū Gomora; 7, 24): A subterranean monster that was awakened from a falling meteorite. After initially defeating Rekiness and holding itself against a weakened Omega, a resurfaced Gomora becomes the first opponent against a reawakened Trigaron. It was killed by Omega's Reticulute Beam. A second Gomora was consumed by Zomera. First appeared in episode 26 of Ultraman.
- Deep Sea Monster Gubila (深海怪獣 グビラ, Shinkai Kaijū Gubira; 9): It was killed by Omega Trigaron Armor's Trigaron Claw Cross Slash. First appeared in episode 24 of Ultraman.
- Molten Iron Monster Demaaga (熔鉄怪獣 デマーガ, Yōtetsu Kaijū Demāga; 10, 24): It was killed by Omega Rekiness Armor's Rekiness Caliber Continuous. A second Demaaga was consumed by Zomera. First appeared in episode 1 of Ultraman X.
- Ancient Monster Leodo (古代怪獣 リオド, Kodai Kaijū Riodo; 11): It was killed by a singular slash from Omega's Omega Slugger. First appeared in episode 2 of Ultraman Arc.
- Cell Proliferation Monster Eldeghimera (爆進細胞怪獣 エルドギメラ, Bakushin Saibō Kaijū Erudogimera; 11, 12): A monster with possession of the Ghimera Cells (ギメラ細胞, Gimera Saibō) to obtain and mimic the genes and traits of the other monsters it consumed. Despite being a terrestrial monster, Sorato has no knowledge of its existence due to having been existed since Omega's arrival to Earth. It was killed by Omega Rekiness Armor's Rekiness Caliber Continuous.
- Friendly Monster Pigmon (友好珍獣 ピグモン, Yūkō Chinjū Pigumon; 13): First appeared in episode 8 of Ultraman.
- Abyssal Monster King Alligatortois (深海怪獣 キングアリゲトータス, Shinkai Kaijū Kingu Arigetōtasu; 16): A variant of Peter from episode 26 of Ultra Q.
- Subterranean Monster Pagos (地底怪獣 パゴス, Chitei Kaijū Pagosu; 17): It was killed by the NDF before the ancient slime mold Edomaphila gains control of its corpse. First appeared in episode 18 of Ultra Q.
- Ancient Slime Mold Monster Edomaphila (古代粘菌怪獣 エドマフィラ, Kodai Nenkin Kaijū Edomafira; 17): A fungal entity with the ability to manipulate the carcasses of monsters as its form of transportation and spreading, whose species nearly destroyed Earth ecossystem over 10 million years ago, only to be stopped by the Ice Age, leaving only dormant spores. Edomaphila originally started as a sample within a NDF's missile (crafted from a monster's tooth) used in killing Pagos, which ended up with it possessing the monster corpse. It tries to advance towards the facility where the first Graim's corpse was preserved, only to be expelled from Earth by Omega Valgeness Armor, causing Edomaphila to be frozen and killed in the cold vacuum of space, because of its weakness to dehydration.
- Uranium Monster Gabora (ウラン怪獣 ガボラ, Uran Kaijū Gabora; 21): A subterranean monster that surfaced from being attracted to Kaen 102 (カエン102, Kaen Ichi Maru Ni), an extraterrestrial mineral which it consumed to grant it energy-exhaling capabilities. It was killed by Omega Valgeness Armor's Valgeness Halberd Quadrants. First appeared in episode 9 of Ultraman.
- Coleopteran Monster Taganular (甲虫怪獣 タガヌラー, Kōchū Kaijū Taganurā; 22): It was killed by Omega Valgeness Armor's Valgeness Halberd Inferno. First appeared in episode 3 of Ultraman Blazar.
- Lightwave Monster Gairyuga (光波怪獣 ガイリュウガ, Kōha Kaijū Gairyūga; 23): A Spinosaurus-themed monster, whose consumption of the Kaen 102 substance grants it beam attacks. Despite attempts at fighting the monster by KSCT and Omega, Gairyuga manages to escape both occasions before being consumed by Zomera off-screen.

=== Space monsters and aliens ===
- Space Insectile Monster Vugsect (宇宙甲獣 ヴァグセクト, Uchū Kō-jū Vagusekuto; 1): A series of raptorial monsters that Omega fought against at the dark side of the Moon, consisting of the smaller swarms and a singular gigantic breed.
- Meteokaiju (メテオカイジュウ, Meteokaijū; lit. "Meteor Monsters"): Ultraman Omega's partners that Kosei Hoshimi controls to support the Ultra. They normally stand by in Sleep Mode (スリープモード, Surīpu Mōdo) until they shift into Kaiju Mode (カイジュウモード, Kaijū Mōdo) to enlarge and/or transforming into their respective weapon modes for Omega to equip and change forms in accordance to their traits.
  - Rekiness (レキネス, Rekinesu; 3-7, 10, 12, 15, 17, 18, 20, 23, 25): (Note: Only episodes where Kaiju Mode appears in giant size.) An Azure Dragon-themed monster with the ability to conjure Rekiness Kinesis (レキネスキネシス, Rekinesu Kineshisu) at the cost of vulnerability to physical attacks. It can transform from Kaiju Mode to Calibur Mode (カリバーモード, Karibā Mōdo) to give Omega access to his Rekiness Armor form.
  - Trigaron (トライガロン, Toraigaron; 7-11, 14-16, 18, 23, 25): A White Tiger-themed quadrupedal monster that can transform from Kaiju Mode to Claw Mode (クローモード, Kurō Mōdo) to give Omega access to his Trigaron Armor form.
  - Valgeness (ヴァルジェネス, Varujenesu; 14-19, 21, 22, 24, 25): A Vermilion Bird-themed monster that can transform from Kaiju Mode to Halberd Mode (ハルバードモード, Harubādo Mōdo) to give Omega access to his Valgeness Armor form. Prior to the series, it was stolen and brainwashed by Zovaras from Omega's control, forcing him to part ways with the other Meteokaiju to avoid their fall to his hands. When Zovaras came to Earth to personally attack Omega, a brainwashed Valgeness was initially used against its former master until KSCT Unit Uta formed a plan to free the monster, allowing Kosei to claim it and return to Omega's side.
- Destructive Monster Mons-Ahgar (破壊獣 モンスアーガー, Hakai-jū Monsu Āgā; 8): A space monster who fought against Omega in the past before it was sealed within Mount Kirifuri. Mons-Ahgar escaped later on when Ayumu and the Ghost Riders stumble into its pocket dimension, forcing Omega and Trigaron to fight it. It was killed by Omega Trigaron Armor's Trigaron Claw Cross Slash. First appeared in episode 11 of Ultraman Dyna.
- Space Pirate Alien Barossa (海賊宇宙人 バロッサ星人, Kaizoku Uchūjin Barossa Seijin; 18): A kleptomaniac race of aliens. Their race first appeared in episode 9 of Ultraman Z.
  - V "Zahgon" (五代目 ザーゴン, Go-daime Zāgon): The 9,992nd brother who wishes to collect the Meteokaiju for his own safekeeping, only for the monsters, Sorato and Kosei to escape. After growing with the scales of Butterfly Morpho, he tries to fight Omega head on until his mother breaks the tension by calling out on their actions. He is voiced by Kenta Miyake (三宅 健太, Miyake Kenta).
  - VI "Gilda" (六代目 ギルダ, Roku-daime Giruda): Zahgon's younger sister with aspiration for romance. She uses the Shaplay Metal badge as a way to take on a human form and shares a translation device with her brother. She is voiced by Haruka Momokawa (百川 晴香, Momokawa Haruka), who also portrays her human form.
  - Mother (母, Haha): Zahgon and Gilda's mother, she breaks the fight between Omega and Zahgon, calling out her children for their selfish action. She would later make peace with KSCT Unit Uta before fleeing the planet with her children. She is voiced by Yoshiko Sakakibara (榊原 良子, Sakakibara Yoshiko).
- All-Out Monster Bagrigon (猪突猛進怪獣 バグリゴン, Chototsumōshin Kaijū Bagurigon; 19): (Note: Written in kanji as 瑪愚罹轟吽.) A space monster created by an alien race, whose initial purpose was for urban development. Bagrigon and the crystal used to control it was sent to Earth in the past and rediscovered in the present day, where it absorbs the accumulated negative emotions and causing it to reawaken. It was killed by Omega Valgeness Armor's Valgeness Halberd Earth Drilling.

=== Others ===
- Digital Life Form Pag (電脳生物 パグ, Den'nō Seibutsu Pagu; SP1): First appeared in special preview episode 2 of Ultraman Blazar. He is voiced by Masatomo Nakazawa (中澤 まさとも, Nakazawa Masatomo).
- Space-Time Drifter Chronoceros (時空漂流獣 クロノケロス, Jikū Hyōryū-jū Kuronokerosu; 20): A pair of mammalian/ceratopsid dinosaur-like mother and child monster. The child brought Sorato to the distant future on Earth where its dying mother was about to be annihilated by the defense force. Using Rekiness Armor, Omega resurrects her with rudimentary defibrillation before defending her from the warheads.
