= List of Shy episodes =

Key visual for the series

Shy is an anime television series based on the manga series of the same name by Bukimi Miki. It is produced by Eight Bit and directed by Masaomi Andō, with assistant direction by Kōsaku Taniguchi, scripts written by Yasuhiro Nakanishi, main character designs handled by Yūichi Tanaka with additional designs by Risa Takai and Akihiro Sueda, and music composed by Hinako Tsubakiyama. The first season aired from October 3 to December 19, 2023, on TV Tokyo and its affiliates, as well as other networks. (Note: TV Tokyo lists the series premiere on October 2, 2023, at 24:00, which is effectively October 3 at midnight JST) The anime uses four pieces of theme music: one opening and three endings. The opening theme song is "Shiny Girl" performed by MindaRyn, while the main ending theme song is "Shiritai Kimochi" (シリタイキモチ; lit. 'Beside You') performed by Shino Shimoji and Nao Toyama. The ending theme song for episode 4 is "Kimi Dake ga Hīrō" (君だけがヒーロー; lit. 'You Are My Only Hero') performed by Nao Toyama. The ending theme song for episode 5 is "Watashi no Aoi Sora 〜As I am〜" (私の青い空〜As I am〜; lit. 'The Blue Sky: As I Am') performed by Shino Shimoji. Crunchyroll licensed the series outside of Asia. Muse Communication licensed the series in South and Southeast Asia.

Following the finale of the first season, a second season was announced, which aired from July 2 to September 24, 2024, (Note: TV Tokyo lists the second season's premiere on July 1, 2024, at 24:00, which is effectively July 2 at midnight JST) covering the "Tokyo Recapture" arc. Seven pieces of theme music are used for the season: an opening theme and six ending themes. The opening theme song is "Willshine" performed by PassCode, while the main ending theme song is "Soba ni Iru yo" (そばにいるよ; lit. 'You Are Not Alone') performed by Shino Shimoji and Nao Toyama. The ending theme song for episode 15 is "Tsukikagari" (月篝) performed by Kotori Koiwai, with a "Mangetsu" (満月; lit. 'Full Moon') version performed by Koiwai and Hitomi Ueda for episode 23. The ending theme song for episode 17 is "Bokura no Love & Peace" (ボクらのLove & Peace, Bokura no Rabu Ando Pīsu; lit. 'Our Love & Peace') performed by Ayumu Murase. The ending theme song for episode 18 is "Uripuka" (ウリプカ; lit. 'Sincere Smile') performed by Mamiko Noto. The ending theme song for episode 19 is "Angel In Black" performed by Sayumi Suzushiro. The ending theme song for episode 20 is "One Day A Boy" performed by Shin-ichiro Miki.

== Series overview ==
Season	Episodes	Originally released	
Season	Episodes	First released	Last released
1	12	October 3, 2023	December 19, 2023
2	12	July 2, 2024	September 24, 2024

== Episodes ==
=== Season 1 (2023) ===
Note: All episodes from the first season are written by Yasuhiro Nakanishi.

No. overall	No. in season	Title	Directed by (Note: Production staff information is taken from the ending credits of each episode)	Storyboarded by	Original release date
1	1	"I'm Shy"; Transliteration: "Shai Nano de" (Japanese: シャイなので)	Masaomi Andō	Masaomi Andō	October 3, 2023
War has ended all around the world thanks to the emergence of national superheroes. Shy (Teru Momijiyama), the hero responsible for peace in Japan, is invited as a guest to a hero show at an amusement park, however, due to her extreme shyness and poor public speaking skills, she fails to captivate the audience, except for one little boy. Soon after she leaves the stage in embarrassment, a roller coaster accident occurs and Shy is able to save everyone without fail, except for one person. The roller coaster loses control and careens off the track; Shy is able to catch it, and bring it safely to the ground, but as she looks inside the coaster, she sees a girl with sustained injuries. This causes Teru to lose her powers and become a shut-in after being blamed by the public. After a motivational talk with her friend, Russia's hero, Spirit (Pepesha Andreanova), Teru leaves her home to go for a walk, when she notices a burning hotel building while walking. She regains her powers, where she then rescues those who were trapped inside. Later, Iko Koishikawa, the girl that was injured in the roller coaster accident, transfers to Teru's school where the two start to become friends. Afterwards, Shy travels with Spirit to space to learn of the dangers threatening the world in the future from hero supervisor Unilord.
2	2	"With All of My Heart"; Transliteration: "Arittake no Kokoro de" (Japanese: ありったけの心で)	Kōsaku Taniguchi	Kōsaku Taniguchi	October 10, 2023
Iko settles into Teru's middle school after being transferred, with the two now becoming classmates. Teru feels guilty for not being able to save her properly from the roller coaster accident, but Iko feels no resentment towards Shy for her injuries. Suddenly, a mysterious boy appears. The boy puts a dark ring on Iko's index finger which causes her to turn monstrous and lash out in rage. When Teru asks what the boy is after, he claims he wants people's hearts to be freer by releasing them from their cages. In an attempt to calm her down, Shy allows Iko to release all of her pent-up rage on her. She releases the negative feelings harbored inside her from the time parents died in a fire which she blamed herself for. Afterwards, Shy removes the ring as Iko has calmed down.
3	3	"Conversation at the Dinner Table"; Transliteration: "Shokutaku Kaidan" (Japanese: 食卓会談)	Masaru Kitamura	Tomomi Mochizuki	October 17, 2023
Iko and Teru go out on a personal day together, although Teru makes the outing awkward due to her poor social skills. Afterwards, Spirit summons Teru and Iko to Space HQ, where they will both meet the United Kingdom's hero, Stardust (Davie W. John). The three of them discuss the mysterious boy that Iko and Shy encountered, whom the rest of the heroes have named "Stigma", whose goal is to "free" peoples' hearts around the world. Later, they sit down with Stardust to discuss the power of the dark ring that Shy retrieved fully intact, being the only one among the heroes to do so. The ring uses a person's heart as an energy source to crystalize and draw out one's inner darkness. Unilord orders Shy to fight with Stardust in order to gain battle experience and strength for the next time she has an encounter with Stigma. However, if Shy loses, Stardust declares she must give up being a superhero.
4	4	"A Heartless Person"; Transliteration: "Kokoronai Hito" (Japanese: 心ない人)	Yusuke Kamata	Yusuke Kamata	October 24, 2023
Shy begins her training fight with Stardust, where the goal is to land one punch on his face. Every effort proves fruitless as Stardust shows the ability of his power: to control what flows around him, causing Shy's punches to miss. He shows no hesitation in attacking Shy with brute and powerful force, as he lacks empathy for others' pain; he suggests Shy to act the same in order to fight effectively as a hero. It is in the midst of her fight that Shy realizes the power of her Heart-Shift Bracelets: the ability to conjure flames. As Shy realizes why Stardust is being so rough with her, she is able to land one small strike on Stardust's cheek with the last bit of her stamina, as Stardust momentarily let his guard down, thereby conceding the fight to her and allowing her to continue being a hero. While recuperating in the infirmary, Teru meets two more heroes: Switzerland's hero, Lady Black (Piltz Dunant) and Germany's hero, Doctor Schwartz (Gelm Stein) from the international rescue organization Black Cross. Afterwards, while walking home together, Teru vows to be a stronger hero so Iko will never have to cry for her again.
5	5	"Shine the Light"; Transliteration: "Hi o Tomose" (Japanese: 灯をともせ)	Jiro Yokohama	Kōsaku Taniguchi	October 31, 2023
Piltz visits Teru to check on her health after her fight with Stardust. Teru asks her to use her healing power on the back of an elderly, widowed caretaker of a stationery shop, Chihiro Nagata, whom Teru has known since childhood. All three women end up going on a mountain hiking trip, despite this not being an activity that Piltz is particularly fond of. Upon reaching the summit, Teru learns about Piltz's upbringing in a mountainous region, where she had both her legs amputated as a kid after an accident. After the trip, Teru returns home to practice drawing out her flames, but to no avail. A girl invites Teru to the school's calligraphy club, where she has an epiphany about how to control her power. Through putting all of her heart in writing calligraphy, Teru finally learns the method of channeling her flames.
6	6	"Ice White"; Transliteration: "Hyōhaku" (Japanese: 氷白)	Kōsaku Taniguchi	Yusuke Kamata	November 7, 2023
Shy is summoned by Unilord to go on a mission with Spirit to the North Pole, where they meet up with China's hero, Mian Long (Ming Ming Li), to help escort a research group from an international organization. On the way out, the group's helicopter is attacked and crashes mid-flight. The attacker is revealed to be a woman named Tzveta, who attacks using ice. Spirit manages to pin Tzveta down while directing Shy to contact Unilord. In the moment, Tzveta then refers to Spirit as "Pesha" while being restrained, which causes her to relax her guard as she, Shy, and Mian Long become encased in Tzveta's ice. Shy breaks free with her flames and Mian Long puts Tzveta to sleep with his Slumbering Claws. Stigma arrives with other members of his clan to collect Tzveta and return to their domain while the heroes catch a glimpse of everyone assembled at the portal. Having taken fondness to the name the heroes have given him, Stigma bestows a name to his own group: Amarariruku.
7	7	"Unchain"; Transliteration: "Anchein" (Japanese: アンチェイン)	Yoshinobu Kasai	Masashi Kojima	November 14, 2023
Unilord brings Iko on board Space HQ, along with Shy, Spirit, Lady Black, and Mian Long to further discuss Amarariruku, Stigma, and the powers of his dark rings. The heroes learn that the rings are made from parts of Stigma's heart, which connect his heart to the hearts of those who wear it. Iko shares what she remembers from the day she was corrupted by Stigma. She saw that his heart appeared very childlike with his mindset as like a refusal to mature, and that his main goal appears to be some sort of world peace. Spirit then speaks about her encounter with Tzveta at the North Pole, and how she might have a connection to her past. The episode then recalls a mission that took place before the North Pole encounter as Shy took part in another children's stage performance, this time, dressed up as the character Revozeale from the anime Rebel! Civil Revolution!, or Civirero for short, for the series' 30th anniversary. While there, she encounters a young boy who at first calls her out for dressing up as Revozeale, as he believes a true hero would not pretend to be the character. However, when Shy saves his Civirero balloon from flying away while also inadvertently quoting a Civirero episode, stating that personal preferences are not determined by gender, he sees Shy as the real Revozeale. As a reward for completing her mission, she is gifted with Blu-ray anniversary edition box sets of Civirero.
8	8	"Surprise"; Transliteration: "Sapuraizu" (Japanese: さぷらいず)	Valley Gate	Taizo Yoshida	November 21, 2023
Teru travels to Russia to meet with Pepesha where they visit Yuri Orphanage, the place where Pepesha grew up. During their visit, the two look through old photo albums from Pepesha's childhood while Pepesha catches up with the orphanage's caretakers. Teru looks at a photo of Pepesha's mother, Letana, when she notices that, as a child, she has a strong resemblance to Tzveta, who, upon her arrival, freezes the surrounding area of the orphanage. Shy unfreezes a suspected victim, who turns out to be another Amarariruku member, Kufufu Kekerakera. While Pepesha has her trapped in a puff of smoke, Tzveta transports the heroes to a realm made from within her heart where she was told is separate from reality and is only filled with peace, a place that is also named "Amarariruku".
9	9	"Melee, Trembling Fingertips"; Transliteration: "Konsen, Furueru Yubisaki" (Japanese: 混戦、震える指先)	Hirotaka Endo	Yusuke Kamata	November 28, 2023
Within the Amarariruku of Tzveta's heart, Shy and Spirit do battle against Tzveta and Kufufu. Shy mostly focuses her attention towards Kufufu, who fights with overly cartoonish methods, leaving Shy confused as to how to approach her. Spirit throws Kufufu with her smoke, then blasts her with her special move, the Airy Blast. She then tries to escape the realm, but is unable to since Tzveta's heart has rejected the outside world. Tzveta further uses her heart to control the members of the orphanage trapped inside Amarariruku, forcing them to fight against the heroes. Goading Spirit into angrily charging at her and ramming her into the ground, Tzveta absorbs her heart to regain her past memories to reveal herself as Pepesha's mother, Letana Andreanova.
10	10	"The Lonely Ice and Small Flame"; Transliteration: "Samishī Kōri to Chīsana Hi" (Japanese: 淋しい氷と小さな火)	Kōsaku Taniguchi	Kōsaku Taniguchi	December 5, 2023
10	10	"The Lonely Ice and Small Flame"; Transliteration: "Samishī Kōri to Chīsana Hi" (Japanese: 淋しい氷と小さな火)	Shintaro Inokawa	Hideki Yamazaki	December 5, 2023
Shy sees into memories of Letana's past as a single mother who lives in extreme poverty with her only child, Pepesha, struggling to feed and raise her and to keep a job in order to provide for her. In the present, while trapped in the ice, Tzveta believes that Pepesha hated her when she was still alive because of the conditions she was forced to live in growing up. As Spirit is prepared to tell her how wrong her beliefs are, her Heart Power runs out and she transforms out of hero form. Shy then breaks through the ice with her flames to tell Tzveta how Pepesha truly felt about her mother and how her kindness and warmth led her to being the hero that she is today. Pepesha, having regained her courage and with a renewed will to fight through watching Shy battle with Tzevta, transforms back into Spirit to prepare to fight with her.
11	11	"What is Conveyed and That Which Remains"; Transliteration: "Tsutawaru Koto, Nokoru Mono" (Japanese: 伝わること、遺るもの)	Yusuke Kamata	Katsumi Teratō	December 12, 2023 (Note: This episode aired at 12:10 a.m. JST, 10 minutes after the original air time.)
Spirit, through Shy's help, is prepared to tell Tzveta her true feelings about her that she has been harboring since childhood. Between the action, memories of Letana and Pepesha's past are interspersed, such as the two hugging on a cold, snowy night, keeping each other warm; Pepesha looking through letters from Letana and lamenting her death, thinking she left her because she felt she didn't want her anymore; Letana promising to drink together with her daughter when Pepesha is old enough to drink. Spirit, hand-in-hand with Tzveta, tells her "I love you", which puts their hearts at ease. Because of this, Tzveta begins to disappear as her Amarariruku fades away and Kufufu leaves the realm. Before disappearing, Tzveta shares information about Stigma to the heroes. She tells the reason Stigma formed Amarariruku: to help create an adult-free world by destroying the current one with the aid of those whose hearts and wishes he has corrupted. After sitting down and having one last bottle of vodka with Pepesha, Tzveta vanishes forever, but in doing so, leaves behind a ring with a snowflake centerpiece.
12	12	"When I Cough, It's the Two of Us"; Transliteration: "Seki o Sureba, Futari" (Japanese: せきをすれば、ふたり)	Yoshinobu Kasai	Tomoko Yamahashi	December 19, 2023
Shy and Spirit wrap up their mission in Russia. Lady Black and Stardust arrive on Unilord's orders, though they were too late and their help was not needed. Due to the threat of Amarariruku, the heroes and governments of the world have agreed to work together and share information with each other. Spirit gives Stardust the ring that Tzveta left behind to give to Unilord. Before heading back, Shy approaches Stardust to thank him for his guidance, being the reason she has been able to be a successful hero up to now. But Stardust suggests that Shy simply got stronger on her own and should be proud of herself for it. With Lady Black staying behind to check for anyone injured, Teru and Pepesha finally depart Russia. Back in Japan, Teru falls ill on her way to school due to the cold she endured while fighting in Russia, with Iko giving her a piggyback ride home. While taking a nap in bed, Teru remembers a time from her childhood when her sister took care of her when she was sick while talking aloud in her sleep. With Iko helping to take care of Teru, after everything she's been through, she sees that heroes are normal people just like her, and feels more at ease because of this. Back in the realm of Amarariruku, Kufufu and Doki Baragaki are fighting among each other, with Doki looking for Stigma, only for the fight to be broken up by Inori Hallelujah, wanting both of them to reconcile through prayer. Meanwhile, Stigma is plotting his next course of action.

=== Season 2 (2024) ===
No. overall	No. in season	Title	Directed by	Written by	Storyboarded by	Original release date
13	1	"Hero's High"; Transliteration: "Hīrōzu・Hai" (Japanese: ヒーローズ・ハイ)	Kōsaku Taniguchi	Yasuhiro Nakanishi	Masashi Kojima	July 2, 2024
After the events of the battle with Tzveta in Russia, every hero is seen tending to a situation somewhere on Earth. In Japan, while out on a jog, Teru saves a child from being run over by a truck. When the child doesn't recognize Shy, Teru runs away in embarrassment. Piltz is providing aid on behalf of Black Cross from a flood in an unknown country. To help matters, Davie, the founder of the organization, wires some money while he has his friends help collect donations. He later arrives on the scene to assist Piltz in preventing a collapsing building from falling on a person. In an undisclosed town, Pepesha stops a bank robbery. In China, Ming Ming is training after his encounter with Stigma, feeling that he lacks battle experience. He interrupts his training to save a monkey that stole his food from being seriously hurt from a falling boulder. At a military base, the United States' hero, Leader Century (Adam Rockwell), gives a tour to a group of children on a field trip, before being called upon to stop their school bus from being carjacked. Back in Japan, a struggling press reporter, Tojiko Asuka, manages to land an interview with Shy at a cafe. While noticing how dejected Tojiko is about her job and how she believes she is a failure as an adult, Shy tells her how she is like a hero by being useful to people by reporting on fun things that they want to know about every day, which gives her motivation to write and publish her article about Shy. At Space HQ, Unilord is thinking about Stigma and Amarariruku's ulterior goals, while Stigma, Doki, and Kufufu are preparing to make their next move. An unidentified girl is riding on a train on her way to encounter Shy in Japan.
14	2	"Wind Coming from the West"; Transliteration: "Nishiyori no Kaze" (Japanese: 西よりの風)	Yusuke Kamata	Yasuhiro Nakanishi	Yusuke Kamata	July 9, 2024
Because of the heavy rain, Teru decides to stay after school to catch up on her studies. In the library, she meets Beni Hanawa, a chūnibyō from the literature club, who tells Teru about the school's seven wonders. She requests Teru's assistance to find one of the wonders, a book located somewhere in the library called "The Bloody Book", whose mysterious existence intrigues her. Teru and Beni both look for and eventually find the book, which turns out to be a magazine made by the graduating students of the since-disbanded literature club, which was purposely hidden. The next day, Teru and Iko are out at a convenience store, when they run into a girl named Ai Tennoji, who claims to be visiting town on vacation from Kansai. Teru and Iko decide to take Ai out with them to spend the day together. During their outing, Ai stops a purse snatcher with a large wooden stick, much to Teru and Iko's surprise. She later confesses to them that her being on vacation was a lie, and that she actually belongs to a family lineage of shinobi, and is currently on the run from home. Fearing that she is being followed and also nervous at the fact that she has never been outside of her village, Ai asks Teru and Iko to stay with her a while longer, when a ninja suddenly drops in from the sky on all three of them.
15	3	"Heartblade"; Transliteration: "Kokoro no Yaiba" (Japanese: 心の刃)	Aya Ikeda	Akira Kindaichi	Taizo Yoshida	July 16, 2024
Tokimaru, the ninja that dropped in on Ai, Teru, and Iko, has arrived to take Ai, the princess of Soga Village, back home. When Teru asks why she ran away, Ai responds by saying that she wanted to see the world and live more freely after being so sheltered in her own village, although Tokimaru insists that was solely for her protection after her clan lived away from civilization. Ai reveals the wooden stick she had been carrying around as her katana, Purity, which has the power to read other people's hearts and has told her about something she feels she needs to do. She also reveals a scar on her chest which has left her body and heart weak since childhood. Knowing about the threat Teru is up against, Ai wishes to fight alongside her. She goes along with Teru back to her house, where she quickly makes herself at home by showering and cooking dinner, when Iko arrives so that the three of them can have a sleepover. Later, Ai further reveals she left home to look for a member of Amarariruku, Utsuro, whom she dubs "the other me".
16	4	"Cloud in the Dark"; Transliteration: "Kuraudo・in・za・Dāku" (Japanese: クラウド・イン・ザ・ダーク)	Harume Kosaka	Yasuhiro Nakanishi	Risako Yoshida	July 23, 2024
During her sleepover, Teru reports Ai's revelation about Amarariruku to Unilord. The day after, Ai takes Teru to a nearby riverbank, where she shows Teru her shinobi transformation and special skills. Later, at a cafe, Davie, Pepesha, and Adam discuss the matters at hand pertaining to Amarariruku, with Adam chiding Davie and Pepesha for smoking and drinking, respectively. On top of a tower, Inori and Doki watch as Utsuro draws her sword and produces a black spherical orb that engulfs the city of Tokyo. At Space HQ, the heroes discuss their next course of action. They decide to split up into two teams: an infiltration team, led by Shy, consisting of her, Spirit, Lady Black, and Mian Long, that will penetrate the void and rescue those trapped inside, while a standby team, led by Leader Century, will secure the void's perimeter and assist the rescued civilians to safety. With Shy being uncertain of her leadership qualities, Ai offers to accompany Shy on her mission for further physical and emotional support, which she accepts.
17	5	"Storming In"; Transliteration: "Totsunyū" (Japanese: 突入)	Masahiko Suzuki	Akira Kindaichi	Daisuke Tsukushi & Risako Yoshida	July 30, 2024
Ai cuts through the dark orb as Shy prepares to lead her team through the infiltration mission. Inside, the city is dark and desolate with those trapped within turned into dark, lifeless, wandering shadows, whose hearts are being depleted by Utsuro. Doki drops in and charges at the heroes, in order to kidnap Ai and take her atop the tower, but his aloofness causes his plan to fail, as the heroes were already en route to said location. Being smitten with Lady Black for calling him "cute", Doki agrees to escort the heroes to the tower. However, Shy ends up offending and enraging him for thinking of his cuteness as "girly", as he believes men can also be cute. Mian Long volunteers to stay behind and fight with Doki, while Shy and her team make their way to the tower. As Doki mistakes Mian Long for a girl, both argue over their philosophies on masculinity, as they commence their battle. In order to avoid a surrounding throng of more wanderers, Shy's team takes an alternate route to the tower by making their way across a railroad track, where they run into Kufufu, dressed as a train conductor, who sends forth a runaway subway car, with people trapped inside.
18	6	"Nothing Is Permanent"; Transliteration: "Shogyōmujō" (Japanese: 諸行無常)	Valley Gate	Akira Kindaichi	Risako Yoshida	August 13, 2024
The heroes work to stop the runaway subway car. Spirit flies ahead to switch the tracks, where she finds another car with even more people trapped inside. Just as she prepares to pull the railroad switch, Kufufu detonates the tracks with a pile of bombs, leaving a cliff. Shy instructs Spirit to switch the tracks, while they both, along with Lady Black and Ai, use Lady Black's long black bandage and Shy's strength to stop the car before it plummets. Afterwards, the heroes find the people inside the car were merely mannequins, meaning there was no real danger, as it just was one of Kufufu's pranks. Spirit elects to stays behind to deal with Kufufu, as she is still emotionally scarred and angry with Spirit over Tzveta's death. Meanwhile, Ai struggles with how to approach Amarariruku, due to their childlike natures, and recalls her shinobi training with her sister, Mai Tennoji, where the two ultimately went down different paths in their lives with Ai wanting to fulfill her training and Mai wanting to destroy the Soga Village. One day, during a fire, the other katana in their village, Nihil, found its way into the hands of her Mai, causing her to stab Ai in the heart and change her attitude, becoming Utsuro. Not wanting to kill her sister, Ai and Shy devise an alternative plan to handle Mai, when Inori arrives unexpectedly.
19	7	"Because of Love"; Transliteration: "Ai Yueni" (Japanese: 愛ゆえに)	Yusuke Kamata	Akira Kindaichi	Masashi Kojima	August 20, 2024
As Spirit remains behind to confront Kufufu, who is seeking vengeance for Tzveta's demise, she asks why Kufufu feels compelled to smile; Kufufu believes that no pain can wound one who does so, and expresses admiration for the adults who maintain a smile through anything. In turn, she asks why Spirit continues to smile, even in the wake of Tzveta's defeat, to which Spirit replies that she is pleased someone loved her mother after her rebirth. With Kufufu's love for Tzveta, who never abandoned her side, she concedes her fight against Spirit, allowing her to proceed. However, Spirit chose to remain and converse with her further. Meanwhile, Inori traps Shy, Ai, and Lady Black within halos, sending Ai toward the tower where Utsuro awaits. She then shoots an arrow into Lady Black's chest, resulting in her falling in love with Shy. Just before she injects Shy with a giant syringe, she breaks the spell herself, destroying the halo above her head and instructing Shy to follow Ai up to the tower while she stays behind to deal with Inori. Later, Doki's rage builds in his fight with Mian Long, only both of them to lose energy due to drowsiness. Shy and Ai meet Utsuro atop the tower, where Ai begs for her to release everyone from the orb; Utsuro obliges, only if Ai kills her. Outside on top of the orb, fellow Amarariruku cohort, Quabala Quabala, films Stigma corrupting the heart of a woman with one of his rings, only for Stardust to suddenly enter from the sky and confront Stigma.
20	8	"A Nice Guy"; Transliteration: "Yasashī Otoko" (Japanese: 優しい男)	Masaomi Andō & Shinichi Fukumoto	Yasuhiro Nakanishi	Masashi Kojima	August 27, 2024
Before Stardust does battle with Stigma, he carefully removes the ring from the corrupted individual's finger, using a more refined approach than the harsh methods he employed in the past, now having learned more about the rings. Stigma sends Quabala to fight Stardust, who complies out of fear of Stigma's disapproval. After a failed barrage of knives, Stardust quickly subdues Quabala by striking her on the head with a knife handle. He then engages Stigma in close combat, delivering rapid punches to his face. With his guard down, Quabala reappears from behind and possesses Stardust, transferring any damage she sustains back to him. Unfazed and inspired by the strength Shy demonstrated during their training fight, Stardust unleashes a flurry of punches on Quabala, followed by a special attack on Stigma, prompting Stigma to retreat from the fight shortly thereafter. Meanwhile, Shy and Ai continue their battle with Utsuro. Ai expresses her sorrow over the person her sister has become as she attacks her in a rage of emotion, backed up by Shy. Having reached her limit with her sister's behavior, she resolves to be the one to bring it to an ultimate end. By piercing Purity into Utsuro's heart, the emotions from Ai's sword flow into her, resulting in the fusion of Ai and Utsuro into a completely new form.
21	9	"Vague"; Transliteration: "Aimai" (Japanese: 曖昧)	Shinpei Ezaki	Yasuhiro Nakanishi	Masashi Kojima	September 3, 2024
Utsuro adopts a new kitsune-like form after Ai and Mai's fusion. She then attacks Shy with the twin swords, and unleashes a beam of light from atop of the tower, leading to Kufufu, Doki, and Inori to leave the area back to their realm. With Shy incapacitated, Utsuro stabs her in the heart with Purity, as she begins to lose strength and bleed out. While unconscious, Purity, appearing as a personified form of itself, appears in front of Shy, asking her to take him in her hand in order to save Mai and the world. Upon regaining consciousness, Shy channels her flame power into the blade, as she becomes one with it. After creating another sword with her energy, Utsuro then creates a battlefield filled with water, rocks, and smoke for their confrontation. With her newfound power, Shy uses all of Ai's sword techniques while Utsuro enhances Nihil's size to increase its power. The two then collide in a headbutt, resulting in Shy heart being connected with Mai's, transporting her into Mai's past memories. She witnesses Mai's time with Ai and Tokimaru, which ultimately leads to the moment Mai became Utsuro after tragically stabbing her sister, setting Soga Village aflame, and departing alone. In a room deep within Mai's heart, Shy sees Mai and Ai, with Ai resting in Mai's lap. At Mai's request, Shy retrieves Ai from the depths of her heart and is asked to save both Ai's heart and the heart of the world. She returns to Utsuro's battlefield with Ai in tow, pledging to fulfill Mai's wish.
22	10	"Hand Reached Out"; Transliteration: "Nobashita Te" (Japanese: 伸ばした手)	Shunji Yoshida	Akira Kindaichi	Risako Yoshida	September 10, 2024
By retrieving Ai from her heart, Shy reverses Utsuro's transformation. Although Utsuro still desires to fight, Shy chooses to drop Purity and instead wants to talk. While reflecting on Mai's memories, Shy realizes that she shares a sense of kinship with Mai, as she believes they are both shy individuals who have borne certain burdens alone. However, Utsuro believes that neither Shy nor anyone else understands her at all. She intends to end everything by shattering the dark orb engulfing Tokyo, when Spirit, Mian Long, and Lady Black arrive to intervene. Tokimaru also arrives with a pardon plea, written by Ai, to allow Mai's return to Soga Village. After awakening, Ai steps forward and extends her hand to Utsuro, who finally feels a sense of remorse, just as Doki, Inori, and Kufufu arrive. Using a cannon, they create an opening in the dark orb, releasing a dark aura that harnesses the same power as Stigma's rings, gradually beginning to corrupt the civilians outside. Before the three Amarariruku cohorts can carry out their plan any further, Utsuro intervenes by slashing at them, as she no longer wishes to destroy the world. In a fit of anger, Doki charges at her but is stopped by Ai, who fully reunites with her sister. Doki, Inori, and Kufufu then merge their powers into a giant teddy bear, aiming to complete their task by destroying the orb. However, the Tennoji sisters intervene, slashing at its claws and causing them to break. As the bear charges forward with sharp teeth, the sisters, united hand in hand, launch a special cherry blossom attack, shattering its teeth and ultimately rendering it ineffective.
23	11	"With the Moon……"; Transliteration: "Otsukisama to……" (Japanese: お月様と……)	Daisuke Tsukushi	Yasuhiro Nakanishi	Katsumi Teratō	September 17, 2024
After the Tennoji sisters successfully defeat the giant flying teddy bear, Doki expresses frustration towards Utsuro for straying from her principles, reflecting on his own past and feeling a growing sense of disconnect from her. In an effort to accelerate their original plan, Kufufu detonates the teddy bear with bombs, creating a large opening at the top of the dark orb, which releases an increased amount of dark energy. Century, aiming to contain the energy, utilizes his "Atomic Cosmo" ability. As the orb begins to collapse, Utsuro makes the decision to sacrifice herself to save everyone by using her "Moon Providence" technique to swallow the fear of the city. Purity calls out to Shy to take it with her to Utsuro to assist her. However, Shy declines, preferring not to contribute to Utsuro's sacrifice. Instead, she formulates an alternative strategy involving Ai and Tokimaru. Utilizing his "Wildlife Transformation Technique", Tokimaru grows wings and, along with Shy and Ai, heads towards Utsuro. All four join hands as Shy creates a ball of flame, which, when combined with their powers, transforms into a massive radiant light that illuminates the city. The dark orb dissolves, restoring the corrupted civilians to their true selves.
24	12	"Fare Thee Well"; Transliteration: "Dō ka Genki de" (Japanese: どうか元気で)	Kōsaku Taniguchi	Yasuhiro Nakanishi	Kōsaku Taniguchi	September 24, 2024
As the mission comes to a close, Stardust informs Century and N. Villio that the dark orb has vanished and the citizens of the city who had been corrupted have returned to their normal state. On top of the tower, feeling frustrated by Amarariruku's failure, Doki charges at Mian Long only for Kufufu to intervene and restrain him, and they, along with Inori, prepare to return to their home realm. However, before their departure, Spirit and Lady Black succeed in capturing Kufufu. Shy and Ai descend from the tower and reunite with Utsuro, who is later joined by Tokimaru. As Ai prepares for her friends to return home with her, Utsuro reveals that she cannot accompany them as she is beginning to wither and fade away. As a final request, she asks Shy to take her Amarariruku ring, which holds her heart's power, to assist in her ongoing quest for world peace, as she ultimately reverts back to Mai in the process. She then recalls to Shy of the time that her sister, Shine, appeared to save the citizens of Soga Village when it was devastated by fire, expressing her hope that Shy can become a bright hero just like her sister. Tokimaru then appears before the group in his true form as a bird—the same bird that Ai and Mai found injured during their childhood—to convey his gratitude to Mai. Mai entrusts him to Ai for her care as she finally disappears. Later, during a press conference, the heroes are questioned about their mission. They all credit the success of the mission to Shy, who becomes flustered as they immediately direct questions at her. Tojiko requests that Shy say a few words to reassure the citizens of Japan, which she does. Iko meets up with Teru and Ai to congratulate Teru on the success of her mission. After exchanging a few more words of gratitude, Ai bids farewell as she teleports through cherry blossom petals. Iko expresses her appreciation to Teru for protecting their world, to which Teru humbly responds that she is just a hero, after all.

== Home media release ==
Bandai Namco Filmworks (Japan – Region 2/A)
Volume	Release date	Cover character	Discs	Episodes	Ref.
Season 1
1	March 27, 2024	Shy	1	1–4	
2	April 26, 2024	Lady Black	1	5–8	
3	May 29, 2024	Spirit	1	9–12	
Season 2
4	November 27, 2024	Ai Tennoji	1	13–16	
5	December 25, 2024	Mian Long	1	17–20	
6	January 29, 2025	Shy	1	21–24	
