= Rainfall (disambiguation) =

Rainfall usually refers to the falling of rain.

Rainfall may also refer to:

- Rain Fall, a 2009 Japanese/Australian action thriller film
- "Rainfall" (song), a 2019 song by British rapper Stormzy

== See also ==
- Operation Rainfall, a video game fan campaign founded for Japan-exclusive titles
- Occupation: Rainfall, a 2020 Australian science fiction action film
