= John Rain =

Fictional character created by Barry Eisler

John Rain is a fictional character created by Barry Eisler. He appears in eight of Eisler's espionage novels as an assassin for hire who specializes in making his victims appear to have died of natural causes. Rain is a Vietnam War veteran who served with the Special Forces; he was later recruited by the CIA, but by the time he appears in the first of the "John Rain" novels, "Rain Fall", he is working "freelance," offering his assassination services to any client willing to follow his three rules: 1) No women or children, 2) No secondary team working separately on an assassination Rain is handling, 3) Principal actions only (i.e., no hits on family members, etc., in order to "send a message").

Rain's years of training in the Special Forces, CIA, and as an assassin for hire manifest themselves in a deep-seated paranoia, an inability to trust anyone, and the drive to eliminate any loose ends (usually through killing) that may leave him vulnerable to payback or revenge.

== Biographical information ==
John Rain was born Junichi Fujiwara (Japanese: 藤原純一, Fujiwara Junichi) in 1952 to a Japanese father and an American mother. He is a freelance assassin whose speciality is assassinations that appear to be death by natural causes. He has undergone plastic surgery to hide his European heritage and has dyed his brown hair. In 1960, Rain's father was killed, so his mother moved them to Dryden, NY where she taught at Cornell.

His passions include single malt whiskies and jazz. He is an accomplished martial artist with decades of experience training judo at the Kodokan and training Gracie Jiu-Jitsu in Brazil. During his initial contact with Dox in Brazil, he was also shown to be knowledgeable in sambo, as well. He is also a Vietnam veteran where he served with the US Army Special Forces and had his first encounter with the CIA that later led to his recruitment. After Vietnam, he became a mercenary, helping the Lebanese Christians in Beirut and the rebels in Afghanistan. Afterwards, he worked for the Japanese LDP, unwittingly for Yamaoto (a local powermonger) and Holtzer (a rogue CIA operative, later killed by Rain himself).

Rain is a hand-to-hand combat expert, although he is also effective when armed.

The character is featured in Rain Fall a 2009 major motion picture directed by Max Mannix and starring Kippei Shiina and Gary Oldman.

== Family ==
=== Koichiro ===
His 2½ year old son, the result of a night with Midori Kawamura, a jazz pianist, who was the daughter of one of Rain's targets. His mother intends to tell him that his father is dead, once he becomes old enough. They live in New York City and his mother has released a CD called "Another Time."

== Allies ==
=== Dox ===
Dox is an American former Marine sniper, also working as a freelance assassin. Rain meets him in Reagan-era Afghanistan. Built like a linebacker and originally sporting a goatee, Dox and Rain have formed a deep friendship, the former having turned down a chance at five million dollars in favor of helping the latter, who was badly wounded. Dox speaks with a Southern twang, and masks a deadly persona with an "aw shucks" attitude. He currently resides in Bali in a home that he built himself. Dox was recently captured and tortured by Hilger and his associates. They had a scheme to get revenge on Rain. He is later rescued by John Rain and his allies.

=== Delilah ===
A Mossad operative, smart, sexy, and sophisticated. She was born in Haifa, Israel and speaks fluent Hebrew. She stands about 5'10" and has cobalt blue eyes. Her profession with the Mossad is to seduce potential terrorists and gather information about them, to enable their assassinations. Rain got to know her as their paths crossed when he had the task to eliminate an arms dealer in Macau, who was also Delilah's target. Afterwards, they became lovers, bound by a mutual understanding for each other's profession. She is usually based in Paris and operates under the guise of a fashion photographer. Known colleagues in the Mossad include Boaz, Gil, and Naftali.

=== Haruyoshi ===
Haruyoshi, a.k.a. "Harry", is a former NSA employee who was born in America and went to college and graduate school there, earning a degree in applied mathematics and cryptology. After hacking into too many government sites, he was forced to work for the NSA. In the first two books, he was based in Tokyo, an expert in all things technical. Rain's unwitting partner, Harry didn't know his employer's true profession—and never asked. Harry was the classic otaku – and, in addition to being a computer guru – was a guy who has saved Rain's life countless times by equipping him with the latest gadgetry. Harry had a "man crush" on Rain. In the second book, he fell in love with a Japanese hostess who showed herself to be an "agent" of Yamaoto's criminal organization, hired to track John Rain's location. Haruyoshi was "disposed of" after letting Yamaoto associates find what they were looking for.

=== Crazy Jake ===
Jim Calhoun, a childhood friend who Rain was forced to kill in Vietnam despite his better judgment. He grudgingly let Rain date his sister, Deidre.

=== Tomohisa "Tom" Kanezaki ===
The CIA Chief of Tokyo Station. An American ethnic Japanese. He had a quid pro quo relationship with Rain. A relative novice, he developed into a seasoned spymaster thanks to associations with Rain and Tatsu.

=== Ishikura "Tatsu" Tatsuhiko ===
The former department head of the Keisatsucho, the Japanese FBI. One-time nemesis and later, close friend/adviser to Rain. Later he is gravely ill and asks Rain to euthanize him, which Rain does reluctantly.

=== Naomi Nascimento ===
A twenty something Brazilian national with green eyes. She met Rain while working in a Tokyo club, eventually becoming a paramour. Being linked to Rain put her in danger, so she relocated to Brazil and went on to own her own bar. The CIA pressed her for information on Rain's whereabouts once he left Japan.

== Enemies ==
=== Jim Hilger ===
An ex-CIA operative, Non-official Cover, former financial planner based in Hong Kong. He ran a private spy company that took on missions the CIA could not endorse. Hilger had too much dirt on the right people, making him untouchable. He ran Wilson, Demeere, Garza, and Guthrie. With the help of those men, he tried to kill Rain and Dox, but failed. Hilger is always described as a very dangerous man, since he is an expert with handguns. He shot and killed Gil, a highly lethal Mossad assassin. Gil knew him as Huxton and believed him to be active CIA. He is known to keep extremely calm, even in lethal situations, which makes him a person of authority. He has a sister named Sarah that lives in New York City. He later kidnaps Dox to force Rain into doing his bidding. This lead up to a brutal fight between him and Rain, leaving him dead and Rain wounded. Unlike the other enemies, Hilger does not act because of seeking personal gain but out of a sense of patriotism. He also cares very much about his men, being upset when John and Dox have killed them.

=== Yamaoto Toshi ===
Powerful Yakuza Boss and politician. He was an expert in judo and had a personal vendetta against Rain after the latter kept a disc containing sensitive information from him. During his time seeking revenge on Rain he became aware of Midori and Rain's son. He used them hoping to draw Rain out of hiding; this however backfired causing only Yamaoto's death.

=== William Holtzer ===
Former Tokyo Station Chief and Rain's nemesis in Vietnam. He ruined Rain's career path because the latter refused to collaborate in corruption. Was a "mole" and admitted as such.

=== Guthrie ===
A member of Hilger's task force, and among those who kidnapped Dox. Was a Federal Air Marshall known for his effective combat shooting.

=== Frank Garza ===
Also known as Pancho. Was an ex marine, boxer and 4th dan in Kenpo. He was one of Hilger's men and was known for his bad temper. Was also a sadist, who took pleasure in torturing Dox.

=== Drano ===
Unfortunate member of Hilger's task force who was killed by Hilger himself. This was due to his arrogance and sloppiness. This was despite the fact that he was an ex Navy SEAL. The nickname Drano was created by himself rather than comrades, which shows him as incredibly narcissistic.

=== Demeere ===
Belgian member of Hilgers team. Used to work for the DAS guarding embassies. Was proficient in both Tai Chi and knife fighting. Was also known to carry out successful renditions.

== Appearances ==
John Rain can be found in the following books by Barry Eisler:

1. A Clean Kill in Tokyo (2003), previously published as Rain Fall
2. A Lonely Resurrection (2004), previously published as Hard Rain in the US and Blood from Blood in the UK
3. Winner Take All (2005), previously published as Rain Storm in the US and Choke Point in the UK
4. Redemption Games (2006), previously published as Killing Rain in the US and One Last Kill in the UK
5. Extremis (2007), previously published as The Last Assassin
6. The Killer Ascendant (2008), previously published as Requiem for an Assassin
7. The Detachment (2011)
8. Graveyard of Memories (2014)
9. Zero Sum (2017)
10. The Killer Collective (2019)

=== Kindle World fan fiction stories ===
The John Rain series has been augmented with fan or community content. Fan fiction publisher Kindle Worlds has been publishing stories that star John Rain or exist within John Rain's world.

- Feeble Revenge, by Mark Adam Douglass; July, 2013.
- The Broken Year, by Daiyu Amaya; July, 2013.
- Rampage in Manila, by Raf Echanova; September, 2013.
- Nuclear, by Latham Bradley; October, 2013.
- Whistle Blower Assassins, by Thomas Hudson; October, 2013.
- The Hawaiian Affair, by Johnny Ray; October, 2013.
- Output Value, by D.B. Talyor; November, 2013.
- Christmas Crimes, by Daiyu Amaya; November, 2013.
- The Sunlit Shade, by Alan Malraux; November, 2013.
- Enemies of Time, by Daiyu Amaya; December, 2013.
- Paradox Code, by D.B. Taylor; December, 2013.
- Time's War, by Daiyu Amaya; January, 2014.
- Hell Hath Fury, by Celeste Easton; January, 2014.
- Snuff, by Terry Niall; January, 2014.
- Junkie, by Terry Niall; January, 2014.
- The Graveyard Witch, by Barbra Annino; January, 2014.
- Where There's Smoke, by Neal Pollack; January, 2014.
- Biography of a Child Assassin, by Daiyu Amaya; January, 2014.
- Iron Rain, by Daiyu Amaya; January, 2014.
- Blood Debts, by Tom Saxon; February, 2014.
- Waning Idol, by Daiyu Amaya; February, 2014.
- Unexpected, by Daiyu Amaya; March, 2014.
- The Hydra Project, by Daiyu Amaya; April, 2014.
- Out With a Bang, by Stephen John; May, 2014.
- Lock Down, by Daiyu Amaya; May, 2014.
- Metamorphosis, by Daiyu Amaya; June, 2014.
- Radiation (Radiation series Book 1), by Daiyu Amaya; June, 2014.
- Radiation Part Two (Radiation series Book 2), by Daiyu Amaya; June, 2014.
- Bamboo, by Quentin Wallace; September, 2014.
- Dead Rising, by Daiyu Amaya; September, 2014.
- Tokyo Vengeance, by Thomas Hudson; February, 2016.

=== Film and television ===
- Rain also appears in a mostly Japanese film version of Rain Fall (2009), produced by Sony Pictures Japan and starring Shiina Kippei and Gary Oldman.
- In 2014, Eisler was going to produce a television series adaptation with David Leitch, Chad Stahelski, & Keanu Reeves executive producing for Slingshot Global Media, and Reeves set to star as John Rain.
