= Fuyajo =

1998 Hong Kong-Japanese film by Lee Chi-ngai

- Film poster
- Directed by: Lee Chi-ngai
- Screenplay by: Hisashi Nozawa; Lee Chi-ngai
- Based on: Fuyajō by Hase Seishū
- Produced by: Akira Morishige; Masato Hara; Kazutoshi Wadakura
- Starring: Takeshi Kaneshiro; Mirai Yamamoto; Kippei Shiina; Sihung Lung; Eric Tsang
- Cinematography: Arthur Wong
- Edited by: Hiroshi Sunaga; Eric Kwong Chi-Leung
- Music by: Shigeru Umebayashi
- Production companies: Toei Company; Ace Pictures
- Distributed by: Toei Company
- Release date: 27 June 1998 (Japan)
- Running time: 122 minutes
- Countries: Japan; Hong Kong
- Languages: Japanese; Chinese

Fuyajo (不夜城), also known as Sleepless Town, is a drama film released in 1998, based on a novel of the same name by Hase Seishū. A Hong Kong-Japanese co-production, it was directed by Lee Chi-ngai with cinematography by Arthur Wong, who won two awards for the film.

== Synopsis ==
Fuyajo is about Kenichi, a man who struggles within the gangster world in Kabukicho. He is despised by locals as being a "fake" Japanese, as he is half Taiwanese and half Japanese. He is framed for covering up for an old friend who murdered one of the bosses, then he meets that person's girlfriend Natsumi and they join together as lovers and fugitives.

== Cast ==
- Takeshi Kaneshiro as Kenichi Ryuu
- Mirai Yamamoto as Natsumi Sato
- Kippei Shiina as Wu Fu-chun
- Sihung Lung as Yang Weimin
- Eric Tsang as Yuan Chenggui
- Kathy Chow as Xiu Hong
