= Barry Eisler =

American novelist (born 1964)

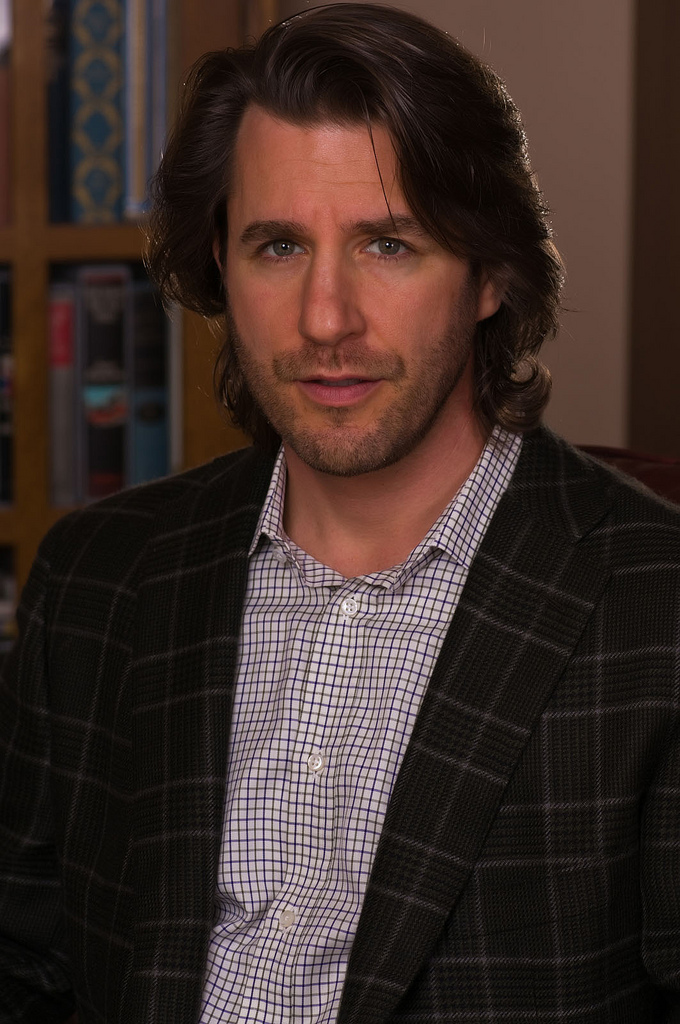
- Barry Eisler, 2009.
- Born: 1964 (age 61–62); New Jersey, U.S.
- Occupation: Writer
- Writing career
- Genre: Thriller
- Website: www.barryeisler.com

Barry Mark Eisler (born 1964) is an American novelist. He is the author of three thriller series, the first featuring anti-hero John Rain, a half-Japanese, half-American former soldier turned freelance assassin, a second featuring black ops soldier Ben Treven, and his most recent centered on Seattle detective Livia Lone. Eisler also writes about politics and language on his blog Heart of the Matter, and at the blogs CHUD, Firedoglake, The Huffington Post, MichaelMoore.com, The Smirking Chimp, and Truthout.

== Early life ==
Eisler was born in New Jersey, his father was a wholesale office supplier, and his mother an environmental activist. Raised in the Short Hills section of Millburn, New Jersey, Eisler graduated from Millburn High School in 1982, where he was senior class president and competed in football and wrestling.

Eisler is Jewish and graduated from Cornell Law School in 1989.

== Early career ==
After completing law school, Eisler joined the CIA, where he trained for three years afterward and held a covert position with the Directorate of Operations. In 1992, he resigned and joined the law firm Weil, Gotshal & Manges. In 1994, he moved to the San Francisco Bay Area to work for the firm's technology licensing division, then left to work in Japan for Matsushita.

In 1999, he returned to the Bay Area to join a startup.

In 2003, he started writing full-time, when he sold the rights to his debut novel, Rain Fall, the first of his series featuring John Rain.

== Self-publishing ==
Eisler made news in March 2011 when he walked away from a reported half million dollar advance from St. Martin's Press in order to go the self-publishing route pioneered by his colleague J. A. Konrath and others. He then took a six-figure deal to publish the seventh John Rain novel, The Detachment (2011), under Amazon Publishing's Thomas & Mercer mystery imprint.

== Awards ==
Eisler's novel Rain Fall won the 2005 Barry Award for Best Thriller and The Gumshoe Award. Fault Line reached Number 18 on The New York Times Hardcover Fiction Best Seller list.

== Bibliography ==
After amicably terminating his previous publishing contracts and regaining his rights, Eisler changed the titles and covers on all the Rain books, and the covers of the Treven books.

=== John Rain ===
1. Graveyard of Memories (2014)
2. Zero Sum (2017)
3. A Clean Kill in Tokyo (2002), previously published as Rain Fall
4. A Lonely Resurrection (2003), previously published as Hard Rain in the US and Blood from Blood in the UK
5. Winner Take All (2004), previously published as Rain Storm in the US and Choke Point in the UK (Barry Awards for best thriller)
6. Redemption Games (2005), previously published as Killing Rain in the US and One Last Kill in the UK
7. Extremis (2006), previously published as The Last Assassin (Barry Awards for best thriller nominee)
8. The Killer Ascendant (2007), previously published as Requiem for an Assassin
9. "Paris is a Bitch" (Rain/Delilah, 2011), short story
10. The Detachment (2011)(w/ Ben Treven)
11. "Decisions, Decisions" (2011)(w/ Dr. Morgan Snow)
12. "The Khmer Kill" (Dox, 2012), short story
13. "London Twist" (Delilah, 2013), novella
14. The Killer Collective (1 February 2019) (w/Livia Lone)
15. The Chaos Kind (October 2021) (w/Livia Lone/Marvin Manus)

=== Ben Treven ===
1. Fault Line (2009)
2. Inside Out (2010)
3. "The Lost Coast" (Larison, 2011), short story
4. The Detachment (2011) (w/ John Rain)

=== Livia Lone ===
1. Livia Lone (2016)
2. The Night Trade (2018) (w/Dox)
3. The Killer Collective (1 February 2019) (w/John Rain)
4. All the Devils (27 August 2019)

=== Marvin Manus ===
- The God's Eye View (2016)

=== Dox ===
- Amok (2022)

=== Valeria Valez ===
- The System (2025)

=== Essays ===
- Eisler, Barry; Konrath, J. A. (2011). Be the Monkey: A Conversation About the New World of Publishing Between Authors Barry Eisler and Joe Konrath. ASIN B004SV2IPC.
- Eisler, Barry (2011). The Ass Is A Poor Receptacle For The Head: Why Democrats Suck At Communication, And How They Could Improve. ASIN B0050O7VLW.
- "Surveillance/Counter-Surveillance" (2012) in Crimespree Magazine #11 and 12

== Screen adaptations ==
In April 2009, Sony Pictures Japan released a mostly Japanese language film version of Rain Fall starring Shiina Kippei as Rain and Gary Oldman as Rain's nemesis, CIA Station Chief William Holtzer.

In August 2014, Slingshot Global Media announced its intention to produce a miniseries, Rain, based on the book. Keanu Reeves was attached to portray the character as well as serve as the executive producer alongside Eisler, Chad Stahelski, and David Leitch. However, this version was abandoned, and in August 2025, the production company Pure Fiction earned the rights to portray the miniseries for adaptation on Apple TV+.

== Personal life ==
Eisler earned a black belt at the Kodokan International Judo Center and lives in the San Francisco Bay Area. He is married to literary agent Laura Rennert, who represents his work. They have one daughter.

== See also ==
- Assassinations in fiction
