= Hase Seishū =

Japanese novelist

Toshihito Bandō (坂東 齢人; born February 18, 1965), known by his pen name Hase Seishū (馳 星周), is a Japanese novelist known for his Yakuza crime novels. His pen name is based on the Chinese name of Hong Kong filmmaker Stephen Chow, Chow Sing-chi (周星馳), written backwards and rendered in Japanese.

== Biography ==
Hase was born in Hokkaido, Japan and graduated from Yokohama City University with a B.A. in 1987.

A few of his novels were adapted into Asian films, such as The City of Lost Souls and Sleepless Town, in 2000 and 1998, respectively.

Hase supervised the story for Sega's 2005 video game Yakuza and its 2006 sequel Yakuza 2. He had no involvement with later entries in the series.

In 2020, Hase won the Naoki Prize with his novel Shonen to Inu (A Boy and Dog).
