= Mirai Yamamoto =

Japanese actress

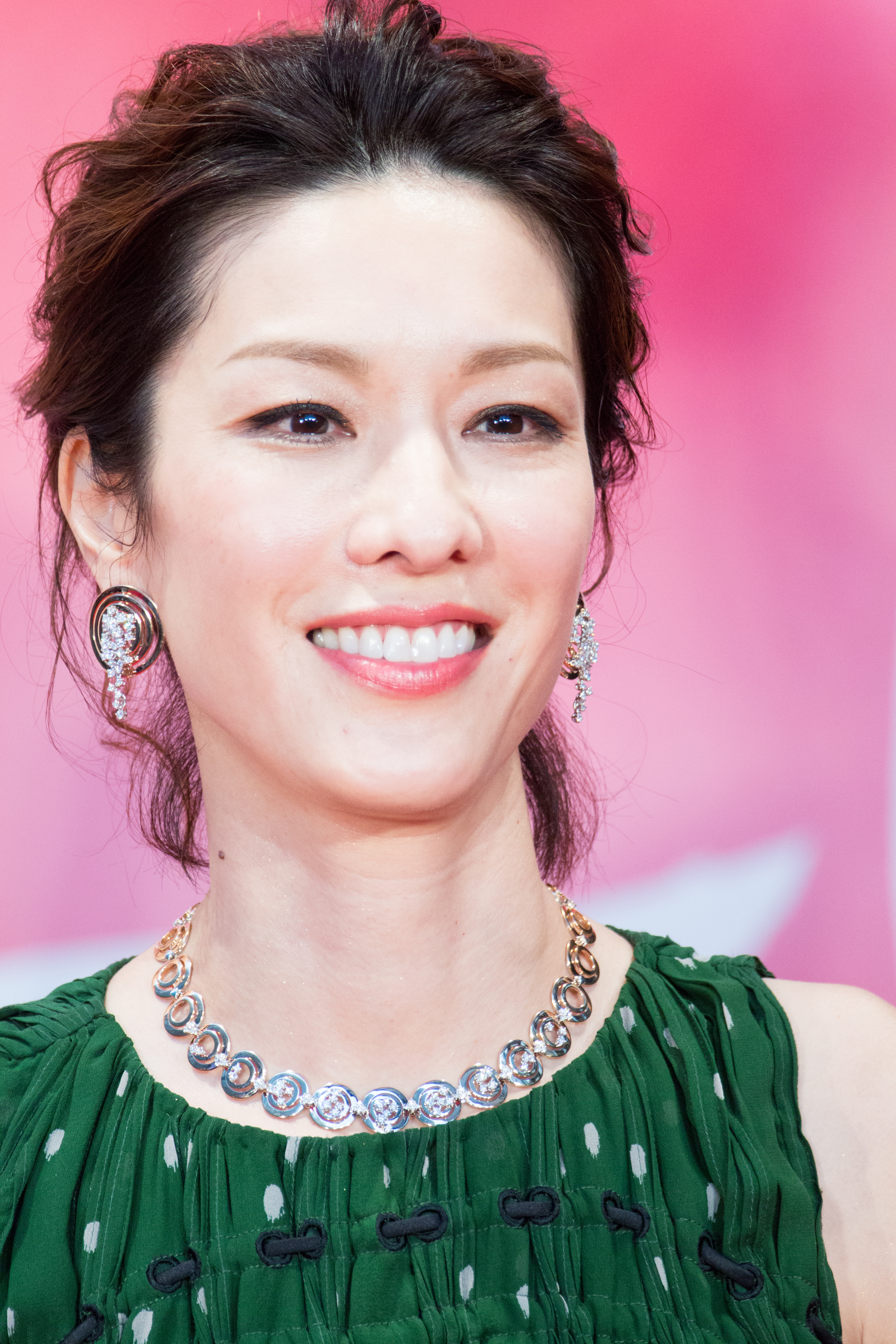
- Yamamoto at the opening ceremony of the Tokyo International Film Festival in 2017
- Born: November 4, 1974 (age 52); Tokyo, Japan
- Occupations: actor, producer
- Years active: 1996 - present
- Spouse: Kippei Shiina (m. 2003; div. 2019)
- Children: 1

Mirai Yamamoto (山本未來, Yamamoto Mirai; born 4 November 1974) is a Japanese actress. Her father is Kansai Yamamoto.

== Personal life ==
Yamamoto was born in Tokyo, Japan. She met Kippei Shiina in 1995 when they worked together on the series Black Out, and began dating him after they co-starred in the 1998 film Fuyajo. The couple married in 2003, and divorced amicably in October 2019.

== Filmography ==
=== Film ===
- Mikeneko Holmes no Suiri (1996)
- Fuyajo (1998)
- Who Am I? (1998)
- 39 Keiho dai Sanjukyu jô (1999)
- Mr. Rookie (2002)
- Kagami no Onnatachi (2002)
- Hotaru no Hoshi (2003)
- Jigoku Kozo (2004)
- Exte (2007)
- Villon's Wife (2009)
- Our Story (2020)
- As Long as We Both Shall Live (2023), Yurie
- Fushigi Dagashiya Zenitendō (2024)

=== Television ===
- 2001 no otoko un (Fuji TV, 2001)
- Kaidan Hyaku Monogatari (Fuji TV, 2002)
- Taiho Shichauzo (TV Asahi, 2002, ep2)
- Aibou (TV Asahi, 2002)
- Sky High (TV Asahi, 2003, ep6)
- Part-Time Detective 2 (2004) as Rie Odajima
- Tsubasa no Oreta Tenshitachi (Fuji TV, 2006)
- Taiyo no Uta (TBS, 2006)
- Akai Ito (Fuji TV, 2008)
- Otomen (2009 TV series) as Asuka's mother
- Tsubasa (NHK, 2009)
- Hanazakari no Kimitachi (Fuji TV, 2011) as Io Nanba
- Ultraman Ginga S (TV Tokyo, 2014) as Queen Kisara
- Ultraman Omega (TV Tokyo, 2025) as Sayuki Uta
