= MindaRyn =

Thai singer

MindaRyn ณัชชา พงศ์สุปาณี
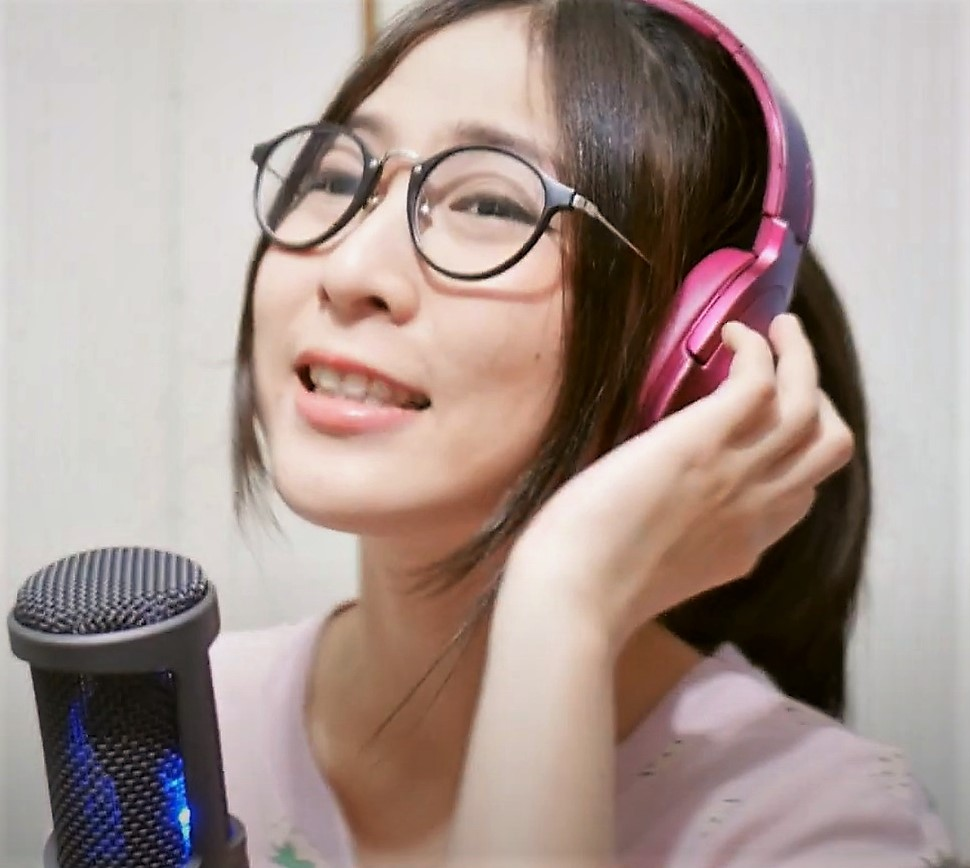

Background information
- Born: Natcha Pongsupanee; February 17, 1996 (30 years old); Bangkok, Thailand
- Genre: Anison
- Occupations: Singer; YouTuber
- Years active: 2020–present
- Label: Lantis
- Website: mindaryn.com

Natcha Pongsupanee (Thai: ณัชชา พงศ์สุปาณี, born February 17), better known by the stage name MindaRyn (/ˌmaɪndəˈrɪn/), is a Thai YouTuber and singer who is affiliated with Yoshimoto Entertainment Thailand and signed to Lantis. Having started gaining attention after covering anime theme songs on YouTube, she made her debut as a solo artist with the release of her debut single "Blue Rose Knows" in 2020, the title track of which was used as the ending theme to the anime television series By the Grace of the Gods. Her music has also been featured in That Time I Got Reincarnated as a Slime, Arifureta: From Commonplace to World's Strongest, Sakugan, Why Raeliana Ended Up at the Duke's Mansion, Ultraman Blazar, Shy and Ultraman Omega.

== Biography ==
From an early age, MindaRyn had an interest in anime and Japanese music, having listened to the band X Japan, and watching anime series such as Doraemon, Pokémon, and Digimon on Thai television. She studied Software and Knowledge Engineering at Kasetsart University, later taking a seven-month internship at the company Nimble during her senior year.

In 2015, MindaRyn started a YouTube channel, where she would cover various Japanese and anime songs. Her channel gained popularity, reaching 900,000 subscribers by May 2021. Her performances caught the attention of the Japanese music label Lantis, who then signed her to a contract. Her first single, "Blue Rose Knows", was released on November 18, 2020; being used as the ending theme to the anime series By the Grace of the Gods, alongside an English cover of the song "Sincerely" by True. Her second single "Like Flames" was released on August 25, 2021; being used as the second opening theme to the second season of That Time I Got Reincarnated as a Slime. Her third single "Shine!" was released on December 1, 2021; being used as the ending theme to the anime series Sakugan. Her fourth single "Daylight" was released on February 23, 2022; being used as the opening theme to the second season of the anime series Arifureta: From Commonplace to World's Strongest.

== Discography ==
=== Singles ===
Title	Single details			Peak positions	Note(s)	Album
Title	Release	Label	Formats	JPN	Note(s)	Album
"BLUE ROSE Knows"	November 18, 2020	Lantis	CD, streaming	85	Used as the ending theme song in the anime By the Grace of the Gods.	Non-album singles
"Like Flames"	August 25, 2021	Lantis	CD, streaming	45	Used as the opening theme song in the second season of the anime That Time I Got Reincarnated as a Slime.	Non-album singles
"Shine"	December 1, 2021	Lantis	CD, streaming	166	Used as the ending theme song in the anime Sakugan.	Non-album singles
"Daylight"	February 23, 2022	Lantis	CD, streaming	96	Used as the opening theme song in the second season of the anime Arifureta: From Commonplace to World's Strongest.	Non-album singles
"Way to go"	February 22, 2023	Lantis	TBA	TBA	Used as the opening theme song in the second season of the anime By the Grace of the Gods.	Non-album singles
"SURVIVE"	May 24, 2023	Lantis	CD, streaming	N/A	Used as the opening theme song in the anime Why Raeliana Ended Up at the Duke's Mansion.	Non-album singles
"BLACK STAR"	July 22, 2023	Lantis	CD, streaming	TBA	Used as the ending theme song in the tokusatsu drama Ultraman Blazar.	Non-album singles
"Shiny Girl"	November 22, 2023	Lantis	TBA	TBA	Used as the opening theme song in the anime Shy.	
"HIBANA"	February 21, 2024	Lantis	TBA	TBA	Used as the opening theme song in the anime Sengoku Youko.	
"Missing Link" (feat. ASH)	July 12, 2025	Bandai Namco Arts Inc / Lantis	TBA	TBA	Used as the ending theme song in the tokusatsu series Ultraman Omega.	
"Kyomei Revolution" (feat. ASH)	October 22, 2025	Bandai Namco Arts Inc / Lantis	TBA	TBA	Used as the second ending theme song in the tokusatsu series Ultraman Omega.	
