= Shy (manga) =

Japanese manga series by Bukimi Miki

- First tankōbon volume cover, featuring Teru Momijiyama as Shy
- Genre: Action; Superhero
- Manga
- Written by: Bukimi Miki
- Published by: Akita Shoten
- English publisher: NA: Yen Press
- Imprint: Shōnen Champion Comics
- Magazine: Weekly Shōnen Champion
- Original run: August 1, 2019 – November 6, 2025
- Volumes: 33
- Anime television series
- Directed by: Masaomi Andō
- Written by: Yasuhiro Nakanishi
- Music by: Hinako Tsubakiyama
- Studio: Eight Bit
- Licensed by: Crunchyroll (streaming); SA/SEA: Muse Communication
- Original network: TXN (TV Tokyo), BS NTV, NST, AT-X
- Original run: October 3, 2023 – September 24, 2024
- Episodes: 24
- icon

Shy (stylized in all caps) is a Japanese superhero manga series written and illustrated by Bukimi Miki. The series was serialized in Akita Shoten's shōnen manga magazine Weekly Shōnen Champion from August 2019 to November 2025. As of January 2026, it has been collected into thirty-three tankōbon volumes. An anime television series adaptation produced by Eight Bit aired from October to December 2023. A second season aired from July to September 2024.

Set in a world where each country has its own superhero, the story follows Teru Momijiyama as the Japanese hero Shy as she fights alongside the heroes of Earth to ward off evil and keep world peace, all while learning to control her severe shyness and to deal with the fears and uncertainties that come with being a hero. The main threat is the supervillain group Amarariruku, led by its leader, Stigma.

== Synopsis ==
=== Setting ===
As the world was on the brink of a Third World War, superheroes appeared around the globe to restore order and bring about a new era of world peace. After the threat of war ended, each hero returned to a country to help with domestic matters, where they were quickly accepted by their respective citizens. To better communicate with each other, all heroes meet at Space HQ (ヒーローたちの隠れ家, Hīrōtachi no Kakurega), a space station used to oversee and discuss matters back on Earth. Much of the power and story in Shy deals with people and their "heart", which is either protected by the heroes or manipulated by the villains. Every hero is equipped with a pair of Heart-Shift Bracelets (天心輪, Tenshinrin) that allow them to transform their appearance from civilian to hero and communicate with others in any language. When a hero syncs their heart with the bracelets, they become the source of each hero's power and abilities by storing "Heart Power" for use when seen fit. The stronger one's conviction and determination is, the more powerful one can become. If a hero's Heart Power runs out, they return to their civilian form.

On the other hand, the villains can manipulate a person's heart by forcing them to wear a special type of ring, called the Made in Heart (心遺物(メイド・イン・ハート), Meido in Hāto), which are connected back to their leader, as a result of the rings being made from parts of his heart. These rings have the power to draw out the deepest, most extreme feelings in one's heart, which can manifest as black crystals on their body. This kind of heart also has the ability to create a domain of a variable size, like a personal utopia.

=== Plot ===
14-year-old Teru Momijiyama is Japan's hero representative, who goes by the hero name "Shy" as a result of her extreme shyness. After being chosen to serve her country, Teru is invited to make an appearance at an amusement park to give a public speech. However, her shyness ends up boring the audience to the point that she leaves the stage in embarrassment. More misfortune continues as she tries to save riders from a broken roller coaster, with one girl, Iko Koishikawa, suffering severe injuries in the process. The public blames Teru for failing to properly rescue Iko, which causes Teru to slip into a deep depression, lose her powers, and go into isolation for a month. Her closest friend, Russian hero Spirit, appears to her to give her encouragement and try to make her understand that she can't please everyone. With her friend's words in mind, Teru turns her attention to a burning building. She is able to muster up the courage to transform back into Shy and rush into the fire to save a woman and a child. After the series of incidents, Iko is later transferred to Teru's school to make things easier for herself due to her injury, as the school is closer to her home. She thanks her for saving her, and the two get to know each other and become friends.

Now, with renewed determination, while improving to become a better, more confident person and hero, and fighting alongside her hero colleagues from around the globe, she defends the world against Amarariruku (アマラリルク), an evil villainous organization that appeared soon after the world was at peace after the threat of world war ended. The group was created by Stigma, their leader, in order to further his dreams of an ideal world made just for children.

== Production ==
In 2016, Bukimi Miki, a rookie author at the time, wrote and illustrated a 43-page one-shot story entitled "SHY", which won the Newcomer's Grand Prize in Akita Shoten's Next Champion, a contest for up-and-coming manga authors, in the latter half of that year. The one-shot was then published in issue #7 of Weekly Shōnen Champion on January 12, 2017, roughly 2 years before the story received full serialization. According to Miki, he got the idea for Shy from the thought of what kind of person he would be if he were the hero in a story. He thought about creating a hero that not only would fight against evil, but also save an individual person's heart and soul. He also took influence from superhero films such as those from Marvel and DC Comics. In creating the heroes for the story, Miki would start with their weaknesses and personalities, create superpowers and abilities based around this, then give then names based on normal words or real-life figures. He puts a lot of himself into Teru specifically, as he believes her character is close to how he actually is as a person.

== Media ==
=== Manga ===
Shy was serialized in Akita Shoten's shōnen manga magazine Weekly Shōnen Champion from August 1, 2019, to November 6, 2025. Akita Shoten has collected its chapters into individual tankōbon volumes. The first volume was released on December 6, 2019. As of January 8, 2026, thirty-three volumes have been released.

The manga has been licensed to many countries in Europe starting in 2020: in France by Kana in September 2020, in Germany by Kazé in October 2020, in Spain by Panini Comics in April 2021, and in Italy by Planet Manga in August 2021. In July 2022, at Anime Expo, Yen Press announced that it has licensed the manga for English release in North America.

=== Anime ===
On October 6, 2022, an anime television series adaptation by Eight Bit was announced. The series is directed by Masaomi Andō, with assistant direction by Kōsaku Taniguchi, scripts written by Yasuhiro Nakanishi, main character designs handled by Yūichi Tanaka with additional designs by Risa Takai and Akihiro Sueda, and music composed by Hinako Tsubakiyama. The series aired its first season from October 3 to December 19, 2023, on TV Tokyo and its affiliates, as well as other networks. (Note: TV Tokyo lists the series premiere on October 2, 2023, at 24:00, which is effectively October 3 at midnight JST.) The anime uses four pieces of theme music: one opening and three endings. The opening theme song is "Shiny Girl", performed by MindaRyn, while the main ending theme song is "Shiritai Kimochi" (シリタイキモチ; lit. 'Beside You'), performed by Shino Shimoji and Nao Toyama. The ending theme song for episode 4 is "Kimi Dake ga Hīrō" (君だけがヒーロー; lit. 'You Are My Only Hero'), performed by Nao Toyama. The ending theme song for episode 5 is "Watashi no Aoi Sora 〜As I am〜" (私の青い空〜As I am〜; "The Blue Sky: As I Am"), performed by Shino Shimoji. Crunchyroll streamed the series outside of Asia. Muse Communication licensed the series in South and Southeast Asia. On October 13 of the same year, Crunchyroll announced that the series would receive an English dub, which premiered the following Monday.

Following the finale of the first season, a second season was announced, which aired from July 2 to September 24, 2024, (Note: TV Tokyo lists the second season's premiere on July 1, 2024, at 24:00, which is effectively July 2 at midnight JST) covering the "Tokyo Recapture" arc. Seven pieces of theme music are used for the season: an opening theme and six ending themes. The opening theme song is "Willshine" performed by PassCode, while the main ending theme song is "Soba ni Iru yo" (そばにいるよ; lit. 'You Are Not Alone') performed by Shino Shimoji and Nao Toyama. The ending theme song for episode 15 is "Tsukikagari" (月篝) performed by Kotori Koiwai, with a "Mangetsu" (満月; lit. 'Full Moon') version performed by Koiwai and Hitomi Ueda for episode 23. The ending theme song for episode 17 is "Bokura no Love & Peace" (ボクらのLove & Peace, Bokura no Rabu Ando Pīsu; lit. 'Our Love & Peace') performed by Ayumu Murase. The ending theme song for episode 18 is "Uripuka" (ウリプカ; lit. 'Sincere Smile') performed by Mamiko Noto. The ending theme song for episode 19 is "Angel In Black" performed by Sayumi Suzushiro. The ending theme song for episode 20 is "One Day A Boy" performed by Shin-ichiro Miki.

== Reception ==
In 2020, the manga was nominated for the 6th Next Manga Awards in the print manga category. By June 2023, it has over 1 million copies in circulation.

=== Manga ===
Writing for OTAQUEST, Jacob Parker-Dalton compared Shy to a similar manga, Kohei Horikoshi's My Hero Academia, which runs in Shueisha's weekly shōnen publication, Weekly Shōnen Jump. While noting that both manga share similarities on a basic level, such as both protagonists being young rookie superheroes and a planet inhabited by individuals with superpowers, he delved into more of the differences between the two stories. He noted how Shy doesn't have as many heroes compared to My Hero Academia, and also wrote about how darker and more mysterious the main villain is, saying how Stigma "is decidedly darker as they prey upon the darkest parts of the human heart, converting victims into the kind of corrupted monsters that you'd see on a Saturday morning episode of Sailor Moon." And also how he "is decisively more sinister as their identity and motives remain shrouded in mystery." Finally, noting the more serious drama in the story, he writes, "[Shy's] own ineptitude as a hero, caused to some extent by her bashful disposition, might now lead to a tangible loss of human life. The majority of the series' first volume and major arc deals with this very real human drama, the likes of which probably never would be published in Weekly Shōnen Jump."

Steven Blackburn of Screen Rant praised Shy, calling it an "underrated" manga, also complimenting how the story "expertly delves into the insecurities of both the hero and civilian in original ways that other publishers including DC and Marvel have yet to accomplish."

=== Anime ===
Sylvia Jones of Anime News Network, in reviewing the anime's second-season finale, notes how Shy has not received the same amount of popularity like its companion superhero series My Hero Academia, mostly due to its adaptation being "more oblique, and its execution is more muddied." However, he had "a lot of affection for Shy's heart and emphasis on the interiorities of its heroes and villains."
