= Rain Fall =

- Theatrical release poster
- Directed by: Max Mannix
- Written by: Barry Eisler (novel); Max Mannix (Screenplay)
- Produced by: Megumi Fukasawa; Satoru Iseki
- Starring: Gary Oldman; Kippei Shiina; Kyōko Hasegawa
- Cinematography: John Wareham
- Edited by: Matt Bennett
- Music by: Kenji Kawai
- Distributed by: Distribution Workshop (worldwide); Sony Pictures Entertainment (Japan); G2 Pictures (UK)
- Release date: April 25, 2009 (Japan)
- Running time: 111 minutes
- Budget: $7,000,000 (estimated)

Rain Fall (Japanese: レイン・フォール 雨の牙, Hepburn: Rein Fōru: Ame no Kiba) is a 2009 Japanese/Australian action thriller film directed by Max Mannix. In the film a half-Japanese half-American hitman protects the daughter of one of his victims against the CIA. It was written by Mannix based on the 2007 novel Rain Fall by Barry Eisler.

== Plot summary ==
In Tokyo, a minister of public works is rumored to be taking evidence of corruption to a reporter: the CIA, the yakuza, and others want to grab the information and use it to squeeze the government. On the subway trip to meet the reporter, the official is murdered, but it looks like a heart attack. However, no one, including the murderer, can find the flash drive with the evidence. Now the CIA, gangsters, and the city police are searching. The dead official's daughters are in danger: the shadowy John Rain, ex-special forces and perhaps now in league with North Korea, tries to stay one step ahead as he looks for the flash drive and protects one of the daughters.

== Cast ==
- Kippei Shiina as John Rain
- Gary Oldman as William Holtzer
- Misa Shimizu as Yuko
- Kyōko Hasegawa as Midori
- Takumi Bando as Ken
- Akira Emoto as Tatsu
- Dirk Hunter as Thomas Perryman
- David McFall as CIA man

== Reception ==
The overall reception of the film has been mixed to negative. M. Downing Roberts for the Midnight Eye review site said that "Fans of big-budget action will likely not be satisfied, but Rain Fall begins, albeit tentatively, to chart the territory for a different sort of thriller. In a future installment, one can hope that it might press further."

Another reviewer points out that "it might be a tough sell for North American audiences, as it boldly paints the United States government as an indescribably evil organization that will do whatever it takes to exploit a shaky political situation. And while this scenario posed no problems for me, I understand why Sony decided to produce the picture in Japan."
