= Kippei Shiina =

Japanese actor (born 1964)

- Born: Masayoshi Iwaki (岩城正剛); 14 July 1964 (age 62); Mie Prefecture, Japan
- Occupation: Actor
- Years active: 1986–present
- Spouse: Mirai Yamamoto (m. 2003; div. 2019)

Kippei Shiina (椎名 桔平, Shiina Kippei; born 14 July 1964) is a Japanese actor.

== Career ==
Shiina portrayed John Rain and co-starred in Max Mannix's Rain Fall (2009) with Gary Oldman. He starred in Takeshi Kitano's Outrage (2010).

== Filmography ==
=== Film ===
- Uchū no hōsoku (1990)
- Wangan Bad Boy Blue (1992)
- A Night in Nude (1993)
- Sadistic City (1993)
- Alone in the Night (1994)
- Shinjuku Triad Society (1995)
- Gonin (1995)
- Waga Kokoro no Ginga Tetsudo: Miyazawa Kenji Monogatari (1996)
- Tokyo Dragon (1997)
- The Black Angel (1997)
- Andoromedia (1998)
- Fuyajo (1998)
- June Bride (1998)
- Sada (1998)
- Spellbound (1999)
- Kaizokuban Bootleg Film (1999)
- Kewaishi (2001)
- Calmi Cuori Appassionati (2001)
- Red Shadow (2001)
- Oboreru Sakana (2001)
- Kaza-Hana (2001)
- Doing Time (2002)
- The Choice of Hercules (2002)
- Hana (2003)
- The Boat to Heaven (2003)
- Spy Sorge (2003)
- Thirty Lies or So (2004)
- Quill (2004)
- Warau Iemon (2004)
- What the Snow Brings (2005)
- Reincarnation (2005)
- Shinobi: Heart Under Blade (2005)
- Sakuran (2006)
- The Shadow Spirit (2007)
- Dog in a Sidecar (2007)
- Unfair: The Movie (2007)
- The Last Princess (2008)
- Castle Under Fiery Skies (2009)
- Rain Fall (2009)
- Time Lost, Time Found (2009)
- Renai Gikyoku: Watashi to Koi ni Ochitekudasai (2010)
- Outrage (2010)
- Isoroku (2011)
- Wild 7 (2011)
- SPEC: Ten (2012)
- The After-Dinner Mysteries (2013)
- Assassination Classroom: Graduation (2016)
- 64: Part I (2016)
- Shinjuku Swan II (2017)
- The Outsider (2018)
- Darc (2018)
- The Forest of Love (2019), Murata
- The Hound of the Baskervilles: Sherlock the Movie (2022), Morio Baba
- Silent Parade (2022)
- Baian the Assassin, M.D. 2 (2023)
- Sin and Evil (2024), Satō
- Good News (2025)
- Rules of Living (2025)
- A Light in the Harbor (2025), Ishizaki
- The Specials (2026)

=== Television ===
- QP (2011)
- Shiroi Kyotō (2019), Professor Funao

=== Dubbing ===
- Snow White and the Huntsman, Eric the Huntsman (Chris Hemsworth)
