= Ayano Kudo =

Japanese actress (born 1996)

- 工藤 綾乃
- Born: 28 May 1996 (age 30); Miyazaki Prefecture, Japan
- Occupations: Actress and tarento
- Years active: 2010–present
- Agent: Oscar Promotion
- Height: 1.70 m (5 ft 7 in)
- Website: oscarpromotion.jp/talent/470/prof

Ayano Kudo (工藤 綾乃, Kudō Ayano; born May 28, 1996) is a Japanese actress and tarento. In 2009 at the age of 12, she won the 12th National Beauty Pageant (Japan Bishojo Contest). She played the lead role in the movie version of Thriller Restaurant (Gekijo-ban: Kaidan Resutoran) (2010) as Haru Amano.

== Appearances ==
=== TV dramas ===
- Suzuki Sensei (TV Tokyo, 2011), Mari Kanda (Suzuki Sensei has also been made into a movie released in 2013)
- Hunter: Women After Reward Money (HUNTER ~ Sono Onnatachi, Shōkin Kasegi) (Fuji TV, 2011), Rei Isaka (teen)
- 13-sai no Hellowork (TV Asahi, 2012), Aoi Wakatsuki
- Blackboard: Jidai to Tatakatta Kyōshitachi (TBS, 2012), Sanae Kawakami
- Kuro no Onna Kyōshi Episode 3 (TV Tokyo, 2012)
- Limit (TV Tokyo, 2013), Haru Ichinose
- Henshin Interviewer no Yūutsu (TBS, 2013), Suzuko Ebisu
- Cinderella Date (Tōkai Television Broadcasting, 2014), Aya Kijima
- Tatakau! Shoten Girl (Fuji TV, 2015), Aiko Takada
- Ultraman Omega (TV Tokyo, 2025), Ayumu Ichido

=== Films ===
- Gekijōban Kaidan Restaurant (2010), Haru Amano
- Suzuki Sensei (2013), Mari Kanda
- Kū no Kyōkai (2013), Miku Kosakai
- Katsu Fūtarō!! (2019)

=== Commercials ===
- Gust - Cheese in Hamburg (2010)

== Discography ==
=== DVD ===
- La Beaute (20 November 2009)

== Bibliography ==
=== Photobooks ===
- ayano (Wani Books, 28 May 2012) ISBN 9784847044632

== Awards ==
- The 12th National Beauty Pageant (Japan Bishojo Contest) (2009): Grand Prix and won the model category
