= Ultraman Omega =

Japanese television series

- Genre: Tokusatsu; Kaiju; Kyodai Hero; Science fiction; Super Hero; Drama
- Created by: Tsuburaya Productions
- Screenplay by: Masaya Honda; Akio Miyoshi; Yukinobu Tsuruta; Takao Nakano; Norikatsu Kodama; Ryo Yoshigami; Hirotaka Adachi
- Story by: Toshizo Nemoto; Junichiro Ashiki
- Directed by: Masayoshi Takesue (Note: Series director. Episodes directors are Tomonobu Koshi, Ryuichi Ichino, Takafumi Suzuki, Kiyotaka Taguchi, and Takanori Tsujimoto.)
- Starring: Shori Kondo; Haruto Yoshida; Ayano Kudo; Mirai Yamamoto
- Voices of: Shunichi Maki; Megumi Han
- Opening theme: "BRIGHT EYES"; by ASH
- Ending theme: "Missing Link"; by MindaRyn feat. ASH; "Kyomei Revolution"; by ASH×MindaRyn
- Composer: NARASAKI
- Country of origin: Japan
- Original language: Japanese
- No. of episodes: 25

Production
- Executive producer: Masahiro Onda
- Producers: Kazuyuki Murayama; Junko Oishi; Wataru Tanaka
- Cinematography: Satoshi Murakawa
- Editors: Yosuke Yafune; Motoki Kashiwakura; Godai Inaba
- Running time: 30 minutes
- Production companies: Tsuburaya Productions; TV Tokyo; Dentsu

Original release
- Network: TXN (TV Tokyo)
- Release: July 5, 2025 – January 17, 2026

Related
- Ultraman Arc; Ultraman Teo

Ultraman Omega (ウルトラマンオメガ, Urutoraman Omega) is a Japanese tokusatsu drama series produced by Tsuburaya Productions. It is the 30th entry (40th overall) in the Ultra Series, The series began airing on all TXN-affiliated networks in Japan on July 5, 2025.

== Synopsis ==
Ultraman Omega follows the story of the titular Ultraman, who shortened his name to "Omega", falling down to Earth as an amnesiac. Adopting the human alias Sorato Okida, he integrates himself into the human society and at the same time fights against monster as Ultraman Omega once he latches on to his subconscious instinct despite his predicament.

== Episodes ==
No.	Title	Directed by	Written by	Original release date
SP	"Ultraman Omega Preview Special"; Transliteration: "Urutoraman Omega Chokuzen Supesharu" (Japanese: ウルトラマンオメガ直前スペシャル)	Kohei Nakayama	Junichiro Ashiki	June 28, 2025
1	"Here Comes an Alien"; Transliteration: "Uchūjin ga Yattekita" (Japanese: 宇宙人がやってきた)	Masayoshi Takesue	Toshizo Nemoto	July 5, 2025
2	"The Alien, Scholar, and I"; Transliteration: "Ore to Uchūjin to Gakusha-san" (Japanese: 俺と宇宙人と学者さん)	Masayoshi Takesue	Toshizo Nemoto	July 12, 2025
3	"Beware of the Cold Wave"; Transliteration: "Kyū na Kanpa ni Goyōjin" (Japanese: 急な寒波に御用心)	Masayoshi Takesue	Junichiro Ashiki	July 19, 2025
4	"Chasing the Claw Marks"; Transliteration: "Tsumeato no Nazo o Oe" (Japanese: 爪痕の謎を追え)	Tomonobu Koshi	Junichiro Ashiki	July 26, 2025
5	"Miko and Mikoto"; Transliteration: "Miko to Mikoto" (Japanese: ミコとミコト)	Tomonobu Koshi	Masaya Honda	August 2, 2025
6	"The Kaiju's Search"; Transliteration: "Kaijū no Sagashimono" (Japanese: 怪獣の探しもの)	Tomonobu Koshi	Akio Miyoshi	August 9, 2025
7	"Caught a Cold"; Transliteration: "Kaze ni Naru" (Japanese: カゼになる)	Ryuichi Ichino	Yukinobu Tsuruta	August 16, 2025
8	"The Legend of Mt. Kirifuri"; Transliteration: "Kirifuri-yama no Densetsu" (Japanese: 霧降山の伝説)	Ryuichi Ichino	Takao Nakano	August 23, 2025
SP	"A Day in the Life of Nariaki Akaji"; Transliteration: "Akaji Nariaki no Nichijō" (Japanese: アカジナリアキの日常)	Masayoshi Takesue	Junichiro Ashiki	August 30, 2025
9	"The Kanenari Kaiju Park"; Transliteration: "Kanenari Kaijū Pāku" (Japanese: カネナリ怪獣パーク)	Ryuichi Ichino	Norikatsu Kodama	September 6, 2025
10	"A Close-Up of the Two"; Transliteration: "Mitchaku! Futari no Sugao" (Japanese: 密着！2人の素顔)	Ryuichi Ichino	Akio Miyoshi	September 13, 2025
11	"Graim Returns"; Transliteration: "Guraimu Futatabi" (Japanese: グライム再び)	Masayoshi Takesue	Junichiro Ashiki	September 20, 2025
12	"What I Want to Do"; Transliteration: "Ore no Yaritai Koto" (Japanese: 俺のやりたいこと)	Masayoshi Takesue	Junichiro Ashiki	September 27, 2025
13	"Ayu Finds Out!"; Transliteration: "Ayu-nē ni Barechatta!" (Japanese: アユ姉にバレちゃった！)	Takafumi Suzuki	Junichiro Ashiki	October 4, 2025
14	"Omega Elimination Order"; Transliteration: "Omega Massatsu Shirei" (Japanese: オメガ抹殺指令)	Masayoshi Takesue	Toshizo Nemoto	October 11, 2025
15	"Those Who Protect"; Transliteration: "Mamoru Mono-tachi" (Japanese: 守る者たち)	Masayoshi Takesue	Toshizo Nemoto	October 18, 2025
16	"The KSCT Special Task Unit"; Transliteration: "Kaitokutai Tokumu-han" (Japanese: 怪特隊特務班)	Tomonobu Koshi	Junichiro Ashiki	October 25, 2025
SP	"An Unusual Day in the Life of Nariaki Akaji"; Transliteration: "Akaji Nariaki no Hi Nichijō" (Japanese: アカジナリアキの非日常)	Masayoshi Takesue	Junichiro Ashiki	November 1, 2025
17	"Snow Blossoms"; Transliteration: "Kazahana" (Japanese: 風花)	Tomonobu Koshi	Ryo Yoshigami	November 8, 2025
18	"The House of Barossa"; Transliteration: "Barossa no Ie" (Japanese: バロッサの家)	Kiyotaka Taguchi	Takao Nakano	November 15, 2025
19	"Chasing the Starlight"; Transliteration: "Hoshi no Hikari o Oikakete" (Japanese: 星の光を追いかけて)	Kiyotaka Taguchi	Hirotaka Adachi	November 22, 2025
20	"Beyond Time"; Transliteration: "Toki o Koete" (Japanese: 刻をこえて)	Takanori Tsujimoto	Masaya Honda	November 29, 2025
21	"Raionji, Enraged"; Transliteration: "Raionji, Araburu" (Japanese: 雷音寺、荒ぶる)	Takanori Tsujimoto	Masaya Honda	December 6, 2025
22	"He Who Looks to the Stars"; Transliteration: "Hoshi o Mitsumeru Hito" (Japanese: 星を見つめる人)	Tomonobu Koshi	Toshizo Nemoto	December 13, 2025
23	"Space Gazers"; Transliteration: "Uchū Kansoku-tai" (Japanese: 宇宙観測隊)	Tomonobu Koshi	Junichiro Ashiki	December 20, 2025
SP	"The Hope of Nariaki Akaji"; Transliteration: "Akaji Nariaki no Kibō" (Japanese: アカジナリアキの希望)	Masayoshi Takesue	Junichiro Ashiki	December 27, 2025
24	"The Final Blow"; Transliteration: "Saigo no Chikara" (Japanese: 最後の力)	Masayoshi Takesue	Toshizo Nemoto	January 10, 2026
25	"Overlapping Futures"; Transliteration: "Kasanaru Mirai" (Japanese: 重なる未来)	Masayoshi Takesue	Toshizo Nemoto	January 17, 2026

== Spin-off ==
Ultraman Omega Side Story: Voyage of Gamedon (ウルトラマンオメガ外伝 Voyage of GAMEDON, Urutoraman Omega Gaiden Boyāju Obu Gamedon) is a four-part novel spin-off released on Tsuburaya Imagination on March 20, 2026. It was written by Junichiro Ashiki and focuses on the Meteokaiju Gamedon.

== Production ==
Ultraman Omega was conceptualized all the way from the second half of year 2023, with director Masayoshi Takesue noted that he was involved all the way from pre-production, a method that contrasted his previous directorial work in Ultraman Decker. In contrast to more recent works of the Ultraman Series, Omega lacks a defense team due to his arrival on Earth coincided with the first monster attack. This was intentional due to the recurring cases of armed conflicts around the world, thus hoping to give the younger audience a change of pace. In terms of the titular character himself, Omega is designed with the idea that he is both "an Ultraman and not an Ultraman at the same time". His face is designed with the archetypical original Ultraman while painted red to make him less recognizable, as well as adding the use of a crescent boomerang akin to Ultraseven's Eye Slugger. His status as an Ultraman disguised as a human is noted to resemble that of the titular characters of Ultraseven and Ultraman 80. Omega's signature pose of stretching his hand forward is called Omega Scope (オメガスコープ, Omega Sukōpu), which is meant to analyze his opponents prior to actual combat. His movements are also carefully choreographed to emphasize his alien origin. As Sorato, the character is intended by Takesue to be likable on first impression, but is able to grow as the series progresses. Most of the appearing monsters in the series are all Earth natives, as they originally started as Earth creatures that eventually turned into their current forms through a passage of time. Exceptions to this rule is the Meteokaiju, Omega's companions during combat and his source of armored forms, as they are instead extraterrestrial, hence explaining his familiarity with them.

Ultraman Omega was first trademarked and registered by the company on November 8, 2024, and published on November 18, 2024. The series was fully revealed on April 24, 2025, alongside a short initial trailer.

== Broadcast ==
Ultraman Omega began airing in all TXN affiliated networks in Japan on July 5, 2025. Alongside its local airing in Japan, Tsuburaya announced the series will air in other countries in both local channels and online streaming in Japan and Asia via its official YouTube Channel and Tsuburaya Imagination VoD service and Tsuburaya Connection in western territories.

== Cast ==
Character	Japanese cast	English voice cast
Sorato Okida (オオキダ ソラト, Ōkida Sorato)	Shori Kondo (近藤 頌利, Kondō Shōri)	Khoi Dao
Kosei Hoshimi (ホシミ コウセイ, Hoshimi Kōsei)	Haruto Yoshida (吉田 晴登, Yoshida Haruto)	Nazeeh Tarsha
Ayumu Ichido (イチドウ アユム, Ichidō Ayumu)	Ayano Kudo (工藤 綾乃, Kudō Ayano)	Suzie Yeung
Sayuki Uta (ウタ サユキ, Uta Sayuki) (Note: Credited in episode 12 as Mysterious researcher.)	Mirai Yamamoto (山本 未來, Yamamoto Mirai)	Christine Auten
Masa (マサっさん, Masa-san; Voice) (Note: Credited under the nickname Masa (マサっさん, Masassan).)	Shunichi Maki (真木 駿一, Maki Shun'ichi)	Josh Tomar
Remi (レミ, Voice) (Note: Credited by first name.)	Megumi Han (潘 めぐみ, Han Megumi)	Tia Ballard

=== Guest cast ===
- Preview Special narrator, Saburo Oya (オオヤ サブロウ, Ōya Saburō; 4): Ryo Kinomoto (木之元 亮, Kinomoto Ryō)
- Miko Nishiki (ニシキ ミコ, Nishiki Miko; 5): Kino Tsuchiya (土屋 希乃, Tsuchiya Kino)
- Yuta Kamiya (カミヤ ユウタ, Kamiya Yūta; 6): Ryuma Hashido (橋渡 竜馬, Hashido Ryūma)
- Nariaki Akaji (アカジ ナリアキ, Akaji Nariaki; SP2–4): Tadashi Mizuno (水野 直, Mizuno Tadashi)
- Maki Arakawa (新川 マキ, Arakawa Maki; 10): Seira Nagashima (永島 聖羅, Nagashima Seira)
- Kazuyasu Taira (タイラ カズヤス, Taira Kazuyasu; 11–12, 17, 23–25): Seiya Osada (長田 成哉, Osada Seiya)
- Newscaster (Voice, 12): Yuka Hirata (平田 裕香, Hirata Yuka)
- Gilda (ギルダ, Giruda; 18): Haruka Momokawa (百川 晴香, Momokawa Haruka)
- Kosei's former classmate (19): Amon Kabe (加部 亜門, Kabe Amon)
- Makoto Raionji (雷音寺 マコト, Raionji Makoto; 21): (Note: The first name is written in kanji as 誠.) Jubun Fukuzawa (福澤 重文, Fukuzawa Jūbun)
- Ahdel (アーデル, Āderu; 22): Yukijirō Hotaru (螢 雪次朗, Hotaru Yukijirō)

== Theme songs ==
Opening theme

- "BRIGHT EYES"
  - Lyrics: Yohei Matsui (松井 洋平, Matsui Yōhei)
  - Composition: NARASAKI
  - Arrangement: Kazuya Nishioka (西岡 和哉, Nishioka Kazuya)
  - Artist: ASH
  - Episodes: 2–24
  In episode 1, this song is used as an ending theme.

Ending themes

- "Missing Link"
  - Lyrics: Yohei Matsui, ASH
  - Composition & Arrangement: thug.
  - Artist: MindaRyn feat. ASH
  - Episodes: 2–13
- "Kyomei Revolution" (共鳴レボリューション, Kyōmei Reboryūshon; "Resonance Revolution")
  - Lyrics: ASH
  - Composition: thug., ASH
  - Arrangement: thug.
  - Artist: ASH×MindaRyn
  - Episodes: 14–24

== See also ==
- Ultra Series – Complete list of official Ultraman-related shows.
