= Saito Koichi (cinematographer) =

Japanese cinematographer

Kōichi Saitō (斉藤 幸一, Saitō Kōichi) is a Japanese cinematographer. At the beginning of his career, he often worked with "Four Heavenly Kings of Pink" (ピンク四天王, pinku shitenno) pink film directors Takahisa Zeze and Hisayasu Satō. Saitō also worked with all nearly every director of the post-Heavenly King generation at Kokuei studio. Now working mostly in mainstream film, he still often teams up with Zeze.

== Career ==
In his Behind the Pink Curtain: The Complete History of Japanese Sex Cinema, Jasper Sharp writes that Saitō is probably the best cinematographer working in the pink film genre. He is most closely associated with the work of Takahisa Zeze, and Sharp credits Saitō with helping the director bridge the gap between pink and mainstream film. For his work in Zeze's Upcoming Scenery (赫い情事, Akai Jōji; 1996), Saitō was given a special award for Best Cinematographer at the Pink Grand Prix.

Sharp judges that Saitō's work in Zeze's Woman with Black Underwear: Snake-Headed Fish (黒い下着の女 雷魚, Kuroi Shitagi no Onna: Raigyo; 1997) is his "crowning achievement". In their review of Zeze's Crevice of Skin (肌の隙間, Hada no Sukima; 2004), cinematopics.com notes that the beautiful imagery captured by the cinematography of Zeze's "partner", Saitō, adds to the power of the work. Bashing, a film Saitō photographed, was shown in the competition at the 2005 Cannes Film Festival.

== Awards ==
He won the award for best cinematography at the 2016 Mainichi Film Awards for his work on 64: Part I and 64: Part II.

== Filmography ==
- Anarchy in Japansuke (1999)
- Bashing (2005)
- Heaven's Story (2010)
- 64: Part I (2016)
- 64: Part II (2016)
- The 8-Year Engagement (2017)
- Threads: Our Tapestry of Love (2020)
