= Six Four (TV series) =

British crime thriller television series

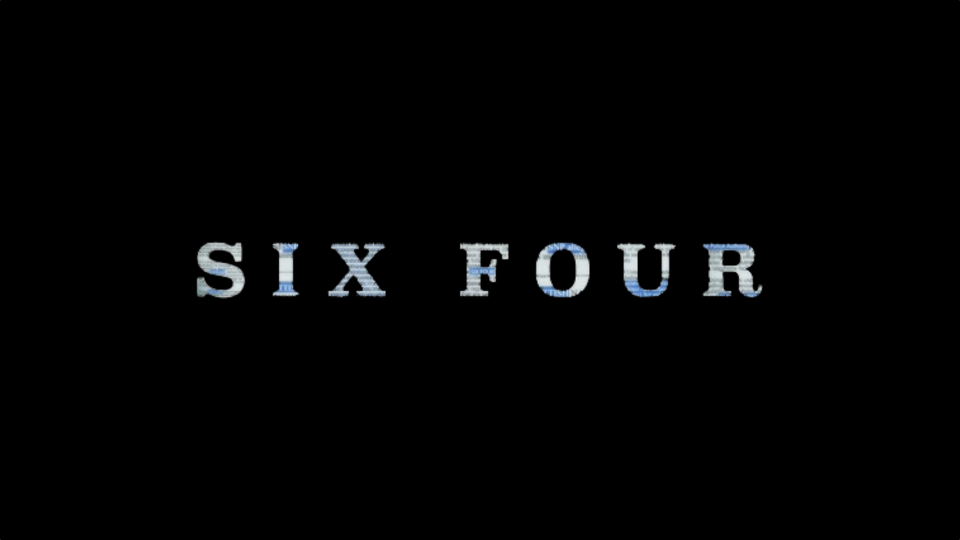
- Genre: Crime drama
- Based on: Six Four by Hideo Yokoyama
- Written by: Gregory Burke; Clare McQuillan
- Directed by: Ben A. Williams
- Starring: Kevin McKidd; Vinette Robinson; Alex Ferns; James Cosmo
- Composer: Luke Richards
- Country of origin: Scotland
- Original language: English
- No. of series: 1
- No. of episodes: 4

Production
- Executive producers: Gregory Burke; Juliette Howell; Tessa Ross; Molly Bolt
- Production company: House Productions

Original release
- Network: ITVX
- Release: 30 March – 20 April 2023

Six Four is a 2023 British crime thriller television series set in Glasgow and Edinburgh starring Kevin McKidd, Vinette Robinson, Alex Ferns and James Cosmo. It is an adaptation of the 2012 novel by Hideo Yokoyama. It was made available on ITVX in the United Kingdom from 30 March 2023.

== Synopsis ==
Chris (McKidd) and Michelle (Robinson) are parents to a missing child, but a wider conspiracy may link the father (Cosmo) of another missing child to Chris' brother, Philip (Whipp).

== Cast ==
- Kevin McKidd as Detective Constable Chris O'Neill
- Vinette Robinson as Michelle O'Neill, Chris's wife and a former undercover officer
- Selin Hizli as Samantha Wishart, an investigative journalist with whom Chris had an affair
- Alex Ferns as Constable Gordon Byrne, a local officer based in Dumfries
- James Cosmo as Jim Mackie, a lawyer and the father of missing woman Julie Mackie
- Andrew Whipp as Assistant Chief Constable Phillip O'Neill, Chris's older brother
- Brian McCardie as Bill Martin, a security contractor and former Special Branch officer
- Richard Coyle as Robert Wallace, the Scottish Justice Minister and SNP leadership candidate
- Alison Peebles as April Mclean, the mother of deceased DC Gary Mclean, the audio recordist involved in the Mackie investigation
- Laura Cairns as Ms Fullerton, a teacher at the private Strathalmond School in Dumfries
- Lorne MacFadyen as Stuart Simpson, a maths teacher at the private Strathalmond School
- Toby Stephens as Piers Fields-Turner, former criminal associated with Michelle
- Iona Anderson as Annabel Wallace, the teenage daughter of Robert and Pauline
- Eubha Akilade as Olivia O'Neill, the teenage daughter of Chris and Michelle
- Frances Grey as Pauline Wallace, Robert's wife and Annabel's mother
- Jessica Hardwick as PC McKenzie, an officer based at Glasgow Police Headquarters
- Peter Hannah as Cameron, a member of Wallace's ministerial staff

== Episodes ==
No.	Title	Directed by	Written by	Original release date
1	"Episode 1"	Ben A. Williams	Gregory Burke; Claire McQuillan	March 30, 2023
In Edinburgh, DC Chris O’Neill and his wife Michelle are called to identify a body believed to be their missing daughter, Olivia. However, it is not her. Michelle (a former undercover officer) travels down to London and meets Tony, someone from her undercover days. In Glasgow, during a visit to police headquarters from Justice Minister Robert Wallace, Chris notices he is accompanied by former Special Branch officer Bill Martin, now working private security for the Scottish Government. Chris is asked questions by reporter Sam Wishart about Julie Mackie, a 16 year old missing person case that his brother Philip, now Assistant Chief Constable, worked on. She alleges Julie's father, Jim, states the family received a call from a kidnapper after her disappearance (of which there is a recording), but the police covered it up. Using her alias “Sarah Jones”, Michelle is rebuffed by Tony when she asks to be put in contact with Piers, someone she put in prison for 10 years. Chris visits Jim Mackie, but upon discovering he is police, Jim kicks him out the house and claims Julie was kidnapped by the Security Service because he “knew about Six Four”. Wishart is intimidated on the road whilst driving home. Wallace announces his SNP leadership candidacy. Wallace’s teenage daughter Annabel is kidnapped from Strathalmond School in Dumfries.
2	"Episode 2"	Ben A. Williams	Gregory Burke; Claire McQuillan	April 6, 2023
Tony reluctantly provides Piers contact information to Michelle. Philip tells Chris that Wallace has promised him promotion to Chief Constable if he becomes First Minister, and asks him to probe Wishart about the alleged kidnapper phone recording. He discovers DC Gary Mclean, the audiologist on the Mackie case, was killed years prior by his partner. However, the file on his murder is locked. Annabel Wallace's disappearance is reported, and local PC Gordon Byrne is assigned to investigate. He finds Annabel's phone whilst retracing her steps. Jim Mackie is revealed to be Annabel's kidnapper. Chris speaks with Mclean's mother, April, who reveals Bill Martin was friends with him and searched his room after he died. Wishart tells Chris she is being monitored, and has been contacted by Stuart Simpson, Annabel’s teacher from Strathalmond, stating he has proof Julie Mackie is dead, not missing. She also spoke with Mackie, who promised her a copy of the kidnapping recording, and told her “Six Four” is a codename for an MI5 operative. Chris takes a phone given to Sam by Mackie. Michelle tells Chris she has made a “big mistake”. She confronts Piers, now terminally ill, for information on Olivia, who she reveals is his daughter. Chris breaks into Mackie's house, but is detained by operatives working for Martin.
3	"Episode 3"	Ben A. Williams	Gregory Burke; Claire McQuillan	April 13, 2023
Chris is warned to stop investigating by Martin, who also threatens his brother. The Scottish Crime Agency sets up at the Wallace residence. Piers has no information on Olivia, so Michelle disarms him and his bodyguard and escapes. Chris returns home, and finds Olivia. She tells him she left due to the lies her parents told her. He confesses to his affair with Sam, and admits he only discovered he’s not her father that day from Michelle. Olivia leaves, and Chris informs Michelle. Jim reveals his identity to Annabel, and claims he has kidnapped her due to her fathers actions. Stuart Simpson is interviewed by the SCA, who reveal he is in considerable debt. He confesses Annabel told him she overheard her parents talking about Julie Mackie being dead. Chris fights with Phil, who still insists there were no calls on the Mackie case. Accessing Phil’s secure server, he uncovers the identity of Mcleans killer, Steven Bryce. Bryce tells Chris he was framed for murder by a policeman, after he was hired to steal documents from a lawyer and Julie accidentally fell. Unknown men took her body and he was forced to call the Mckenzie residence by Robert Wallace. Annabel convinces Jim to open the door, and knocks him out with a brick and escapes. She runs into Byrne, revealed to be aligned with Jim, who returns her and knocks her out.
4	"Episode 4"	Ben A. Williams	Gregory Burke; Claire McQuillan	April 20, 2023
Chris meets Michelle, and they escape Martin’s men. Byrne calls Wallace with coordinates to meet in Galloway. Wallace reveals to Philip that Jim Mackie was his mentor. Byrne reveals to Annabel he was part of the Julie Mackie case, and DC Gary Mclean’s real partner, and is seeking revenge against Robert Wallace for his death. Wallace meets Mackie at a rural rendezvous, monitored by the police. Jim reveals it was Wallace who instructed Bryce to break into his house (where he accidentally killed Julie) to steal documents evidencing Wallace is an MI5 infiltrator into the SNP to prevent Scottish independence, codenamed “Six Four”. He demands Wallace go public in exchange for Annabel. Chris receives Annabel’s location on a phone he took from Sam, and meets with Byrne at the house, who holds him at gunpoint and reveals the same information. Upon hearing Martin’s men are en route, he gives a USB with a copy of the kidnap recording and documents to Chris and Michelle and releases Annabel. Confronted by Martin, Byrne commits suicide. Jim is killed by a CTSFO sniper when he advances on Wallace. Wallace is later appointed Deputy First Minister. Chris does not go public with the information, but plays the USB recording to Philip, which implicates him. He gives him the drive, urging him to do the right thing as a police officer.

== Production ==
The series is produced by House Productions. Clare Kerr is producer and Ben A. Williams is director. Gregory Burke is script writer executive producer alongside Juliette Howell, Tessa Ross, and Molly Bolt. Clare Mcquillan is also a writer on the series.

The adaptation moves the setting from Kyoto in Japan to Glasgow, Scotland, with the main character’s name changing from Mikami to Chris.

=== Casting ===
Kevin McKidd and Vinette Robinson were revealed to be cast as Chris and Michelle O’ Neill in May 2022.

=== Filming ===
Six Four was filmed in both Glasgow and Edinburgh in Scotland in the summer of 2022.

=== Music ===
Music from the television series was released by Dubois Records on March 30, 2023. The album features a selection of original music for the series by Luke Richards.

== Broadcast ==
The series was available on ITVX in the United Kingdom from 30 March 2023. ITV1 began airing the four episodes weekly, commencing Sunday 22 October 2023.

== Reception ==
Charlotta Billstrom awarded the series four stars in the Evening Standard, saying, "The cast deliver excellent performances" and "It’s tightly plotted too, and filler-free, making for four powerful episodes full of twists and turns."
