= Run, Melos! =

20th century Japanese short story

"Run, Melos!" (走れメロス, Hashire Merosu) is a Japanese short story by Osamu Dazai. It was first published in 1940 and is a widely read classic in Japanese schools. It was first used as teaching material for Japanese middle high schoolers in 1956.

The story is a reworking of Friedrich Schiller's ballad Die Bürgschaft, which tells the story of Melos and Selinuntius, originally Damon and Pythias. Schiller's version revolves around the ancient Greek legend of Damon and Pythias recorded by the Roman author Gaius Julius Hyginus.

The most prominent theme of "Run, Melos!" is unwavering friendship. Despite hardships, the protagonist succeeds in saving his friend's life.

== Story ==
Melos is a naive young shepherd with a sense of justice. He lives in a land ruled by Dionysius, a tyrant king who has killed many people, including his family members, due to his solitude and distrust of people. When Melos hears about the King's deeds, he is outraged, and he decides to assassinate the King. He sneaks into the castle with a knife but is caught and arrested. Although Melos defiantly owns up to his plan to kill the King, he pleads with the cynical tyrant to postpone his execution for three days so that he can return home to arrange his younger sister's marriage. As collateral for his pledge to return, Melos offers his friend Selinuntius as a hostage, who would be executed in his stead should Melos not return in time. The King agrees to Melos' conditions but threatens to kill him should he return moments too late. Melos insists that saving his own life is not his intention. Informed of the situation, Selinuntius readily agrees to the role that Melos assigned him without asking.

Back in his hometown, Melos tells his eager sister and her hesitant fiancé that there is an urgent need for them to be married, but does not reveal his true motivations. While the wedding festivities are in progress, Melos goes to bed to get some rest but ends up oversleeping. Consequently, he sets off to return to the city the next morning. Along the way, he experiences many hardships, such as a broken bridge due to the overflowing of the river and bandit attacks. The combination of physical exhaustion and said impediments tire him. Since his fatigue makes him indifferent to the fate of his friend and the impact that his death will have on his own reputation, Melos slows down and nearly gives up while taking a break. After contemplating the consequences while drinking fresh water from a spring, he rushes off for the sake of his friend's life and to prevent the King from justifying his cynical views. While Melos desperately runs back to Syracuse, a mutual acquaintance attempts to persuade him to give up, claiming that Melos is already too late.

In the evening, Melos arrives in the city just in time to save his friend Selinuntius from his public execution. Melos implores Selinuntius to hit him to atone for his treachery, and Selinuntius asks him to do the same for having doubted Melos' return while being held captive because of him. The King, forced to reexamine his position due to the crowd's reaction, decides to let Melos go.

== References in other media ==
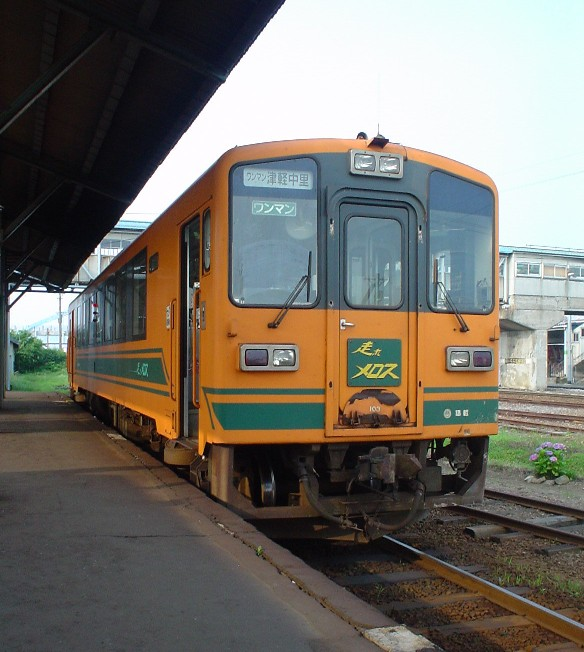
"Hashire Merosu", a 21 series railcar

- In Dazai's hometown, Kanagi (now Goshogawara, Aomori), there is a diesel train nicknamed "Hashire Merosu", owned by the Tsugaru Railway Company.
- "Melos no Yō ni ~Lonely Way~", the opening theme song for the anime series Blue Comet SPT Layzner, refers to the story both in its title and in the chorus line "Hashire, Melos no yō ni" ("Run, just like Melos").
- The third line in the second verse of the song "Happy Birthday" by The Blue Hearts is "Ame no naka o hashire, Melos" ("Run, Melos, in the rain").
- The AKB48 song "Melos no Michi" (Melos's Road) references the storyline in its lyrics.
- The first line in the second verse of the song "Mahou de Choi²" of the anime Ojamajo Doremi references it in its lyrics: "Hashire merosu datte hashireba hyoihyoi".
- Kashiwa Daisuke's song "Write Once, Run Melos" is program music based on the short story.
- The 161st episode of the anime Prince of Tennis is titled "Run, Momo!" as a tribute to the story.
- The 6th episode of the anime Tsuki ga Kirei is titled "Run, Melos!" as a tribute to the story.
- In the Hikaru Utada song "Bōkyaku" (Oblivion) (feat. KOHH), the line "Hashire Melos" appears in KOHH's last verse.
- The Wednesday Campanella song "Melos" makes reference to the story.
- In the second half of the anime Tweeny Witches, Arusu, the protagonist, finds herself stuck in a similar situation and even mentions the tale itself.
- The "Run, Melos! Music Festival" executive committee, headed by committee chairman Shoichiro Kawamura, was established in 2016 to let people know that there are many musical pieces based on "Run, Melos!". The "Run, Melos! Music Festival" was held on June 25, 2017, in Hirosaki, Aomori Prefecture.
- In The Intrigues of Haruhi Suzumiya, the protagonist Kyon compares Mikuru Asahina's waiting for him to the situation of Selinuntius waiting for the return of Melos to save him from certain death.
- In manga and anime Hanada Shōnen Shi there an episode titled "Run, Melon!" where the protagonist also has to run to save a friend.
- The story is discussed by characters in the novel The Cat Who Saved Books.

== Adaptations ==
- Hashire Merosu (dorama, NHK 1955)
- Akai tori no kokoro: Nihon meisaku douwa shirīzu Hashire Merosu (anime, TV Asahi 1979)
- Hashire Melos (anime, Fuji TV 1981)
- Hashire Melos! (anime movie, 1992)
- Terebi ehon Hashire Merosu (recitation by Tarō Yamamoto in 2006)
- Aoi Bungaku episodes 9–10 (anime, 2009)
- Bungo to Alchemist -Gears of Judgment episode 1 (anime, 2020)

== Japanese language teaching material ==
According to Kunihiro Kouda, "Run, Melos!" was used as a Japanese language textbook for second graders (children of ages 13–14) in Japanese middle schools by Chukyo.

In the beginning, it was also used in Japanese high school textbooks for students ranging from 15 to 17 years old. In addition, it was a Japanese middle school textbook, used by 13–15-year-olds in the middle 1960's. After 1970, it began to consistently be a part of the second-grade Japanese curriculum. Due to its popularity, publishers would frequently resort to omitting the middle or end of the book. This practice was carried out until the end of the 1972 Japanese fiscal year. In academia, emphasis was originally placed on the moral values the story displayed. Recently, it has been mainly used for its literary value.

== Bibliography ==
- Run, Melos! and Other Stories, translated by Ralph F. McCarthy. Tokyo, Kodansha International, 1988.
