= Jōmō Shimbun =

Japanese newspaper

上毛新聞 Jōmō Shimbun
- Type: Daily newspaper
- Format: Broadsheet (40.6 x 54.6 cm)
- Founded: November 1, 1887
- Language: Japanese
- Circulation: 270.380
- Website: http://www.jomo-news.co.jp/

Jōmō Shimbun (上毛新聞) is the largest general circulation daily newspaper based in Gunma prefecture, Japan. It was established in 1887 and has a circulation of 280,320.

Hideo Yokoyama, a novelist, had worked for the Jōmō Shimbun as a journalist for 12 years.
