= Climber's High (film) =

- Poster
- Directed by: Masato Harada
- Screenplay by: Masato Katō; Izuru Narushima; Masato Harada
- Based on: Seventeen by Hideo Yokoyama
- Starring: Shin'ichi Tsutsumi; Masato Sakai; Machiko Ono; Masahiro Takashima; Tsutomu Yamazaki
- Cinematography: Gen Kobayashi
- Edited by: Eugene Harada; Hiroshi Sunaga
- Music by: Takatsugu Muramatsu
- Distributed by: Toei Company
- Release date: July 5, 2008 (Japan)
- Running time: 145 minutes
- Country: Japan
- Language: Japanese

Climber's High (Japanese: クライマーズ・ハイ, Hepburn: Kuraimāzu Hai) is a 2008 Japanese film directed by Masato Harada. It is an adaptation of the novel Seventeen, titled in Japanese as Climber's High, by Hideo Yokoyama.

== Plot ==
The film is about a newspaper editor, Kazumasa Yuuki (悠木 和雅, Yūki Kazumasa), (played by Shin'ichi Tsutsumi) who deals with the crash of Japan Air Lines Flight 123.

Yuuki was preparing to set off. Just then Tatsuya Sayama (佐山 達哉, Sayama Tatsuya) (played by Masato Sakai) came over and said to him: "A 747 seems to have crashed." Then came a news report from a news agency: "Japan Air Lines Flight 123, flying from Haneda Airport to Osaka, disappeared from the radar screen dozens of kilometers northwest of Yokota Base." 520 lives disappeared in an instant. Can the typeface in the newspaper bear the weight of life? Whether to choose moral sympathy or ruthless truth, news reporting faces the most difficult dilemma.

Faced with exclusive inside news, Yuuki, who was in extreme condition, made a decision resolutely.

== Accolades ==
51st Blue Ribbon Awards

- Best Film
- Best Supporting Actor - Masato Sakai
