= Dealing with Disaster in Japan =

2011 book by Christopher P. Hood

Dealing with Disaster in Japan: Responses to the Flight JL123 Crash
- First edition
- Author: Christopher P. Hood
- Genre: Non-fiction
- Publisher: Routledge
- Publication date: 2011

Dealing with Disaster in Japan: Responses to the Flight JL123 Crash is a 2011 book written by Christopher P. Hood, a lecturer of Japanese studies at Cardiff University, and published by Routledge. It is about Japan Air Lines Flight 123, and together with its sequel Osutaka: A Chronicle of Loss In the World's Largest Single Plane Crash, are the only English-language books entirely about that accident. The book discusses the accident and its societal aftermath and compares and contrasts the response to JL123 to that of other accidents. The audience for the book involves those in studies of Japan and those studying aircraft accidents, and it is aimed at both academics and non-academics.

== Background ==
Hood had invited Peter Mathews, the father of British JAL123 victim Kimble Mathews, to speak to his students. Hood stated that he had an emotional response to the father's testimony, so he decided to research the accident. Peter Mathews provided access to a diary and photographs taken in 1985. Hood wrote the book because much of the information was in Japanese while there was also a lot of interest in the incident from those outside Japan.

== Contents ==
The book includes nine chapters, arranged in five parts.

Hood took almost 100 photographs of the Osutaka Pilgrimage. Several photos were labeled as having been taken in 2010 and one is labeled as a 2009 photo; the others do not have their dates mentioned.

The book includes a list of victims in Japanese and English. The footer of each page has several names of the deceased, so the list is spread across the book. Junko Otani (大谷 順子, Ōtani Junko) of Osaka University stated that the names were used "as a reminder of the cost of human life" and that "This was an effective presentation of information that successfully expressed the weight of human loss and of this book’s implicit story of human tragedy."

== Reception ==
Jeff Kingston, Director of Asian Studies, Temple University Japan, wrote in The Japan Times that Dealing with Disaster in Japan was an "excellent book" that "brilliantly" describes the "haunting saga".

Otani concluded that "I believe this book will become one of the classics among disaster studies in Japan, as well as works of Japanese history and other works related to issues of social and collective memory".

== Osutaka ==
In 2014, Osutaka: A Chronicle of Loss In the World's Largest Single Plane Crash was published by Christopher Hood. Osutaka is a collection of writings and interviews with Peter Mathews, father of Flight 123 victim Kimble Mathews and JAL employee Keith Haines, who was the company's liaison for the family during their trip to Japan in the aftermath of the crash in August 1985. Peter kept a diary documenting the trip from 12–28 August 1985. The daily diary entries are interspersed with interviews between Christopher Hood, Peter Mathews and Keith Haines and photographs taken by Peter.

A second edition was released in 2018, containing a new epilogue by Christopher Hood, following the death of Peter Mathews in January 2018.

== See also ==
- Seventeen, a novel about JAL123
