= Ultraman Blazar =

Japanese television series

- Genre: Tokusatsu; Kaiju; Kyodai Hero; Science fiction; Drama
- Created by: Tsuburaya Productions
- Screenplay by: Jun Tsugita; Taiki Yamazaki; Sumio Uetake; Junichiro Ashiki; Takao Nakano; Toshizo Nemoto
- Story by: Keigo Koyanagi
- Directed by: Kiyotaka Taguchi (Note: Series director. Episodes directors are Takanori Tsujimoto, Kazuhiro Nakagawa, Tomonobu Koshi, Masayoshi Takesue, and Ryuta Miyazaki.)
- Starring: Tomoya Warabino; Himena Tsukimiya; Konomi Naito; Hayate Kajihara; Yuki Ito; Masaya Kato
- Voices of: Akira Ishida
- Opening theme: "Bokura no Spectra"; by Hiroshi Kitadani
- Ending theme: "Black Star"; by MindaRyn; "Brave Blazar"; by MindaRyn feat. Technoboys Pulcraft Green-Fund
- Composer: Technoboys Pulcraft Green-Fund
- Country of origin: Japan
- Original language: Japanese
- No. of episodes: 25

Production
- Executive producer: Masahiro Onda
- Producers: Kazuyuki Murayama; Junko Oishi; Hayato Saga
- Cinematography: Satoshi Murakawa
- Editor: Yosuke Yafune
- Running time: 25 minutes
- Production companies: Tsuburaya Productions; TV Tokyo; Dentsu

Original release
- Network: TXN (TV Tokyo)
- Release: July 8, 2023 – January 20, 2024

Related
- Ultraman Decker; Ultraman Arc

Ultraman Blazar (ウルトラマンブレーザー, Urutoraman Burēzā) is a Japanese tokusatsu drama produced by Tsuburaya Productions, released to coincide with the company's 60th anniversary. It is the 28th entry (38th overall) in the Ultra Series, the fifth installment in the Reiwa era and the first series to lean towards serious hard science fiction since Ultraman Gaia and Ultraman Nexus. The series began airing on TV Tokyo on July 8, 2023 and on YouTube after the airing.

== Synopsis ==
The Global Guardian Force (GGF) was established in 1966 in response to the worldwide outbreak of kaiju attacks. As global warming continues to rise, a GGF special forces unit led by Gento Hiruma finds itself in a dangerous situation when its cleanup operation goes awry before an Ultraman appears. Gento is later transferred to lead SKaRD, short for the Special Kaiju Reaction Detachment, a newly formed covert team that utilizes the Earth Garon robot to combat kaiju. Gento revealed to have become the host of Ultraman Blazar, leads SKaRD against the kaiju while figuring out the meaning of visions he has of another galaxy.

== Characters ==
=== SKaRD ===
Special Kaiju Reaction Detachment (特殊怪獣対応分遣隊, Tokushu Kaijū Taiō Bunken-tai), abbreviated as SKaRD (スカード, Sukādo), is a special forces unit established within the GGFJ.

- Gento Hiruma (ヒルマ ゲント, Hiruma Gento): (Note: The names of the five SKaRD members are written in kanji as 比留間 弦人, 蒼辺 恵美, 美南 杏梨, 坂藤 泰信, and 名倉 輝明, respectively.) The 30-year-old captain of SKaRD, born on November 3, 1992. He transforms into Ultraman Blazar with the Blazar Brace (ブレーザーブレス, Burēzā Buresu) and the Blazar Stone (ブレーザーストーン, Burēzā Sutōn) crystal. He is portrayed by Tomoya Warabino (蕨野 友也, Warabino Tomoya).
- Emi Aobe (アオベ エミ, Aobe Emi): A 23-year-old intelligence specialist, born on October 11, 1999. She is portrayed by Himena Tsukimiya (搗宮 姫奈, Tsukimiya Himena). As a baby, Emi is portrayed by Honoka Koshi (越 萌乃佳, Koshi Honoka).
- Anri Minami (ミナミ アンリ, Minami Anri): A 26-year-old pilot for Earth Garon, born on May 8, 1997. She is portrayed by Konomi Naito (内藤 好美, Naitō Konomi). As a child, Anri is portrayed by Chieri Fujiyama (藤山 千恵梨, Fujiyama Chieri).
- Yasunobu Bando (バンドウ ヤスノブ, Bandō Yasunobu): A 25-year-old skilled mechanic and pilot for Earth Garon, born on April 22, 1998. He is portrayed by Hayate Kajihara (梶原 颯, Kajihara Hayate)
- Teruaki Nagura (ナグラ テルアキ, Nagura Teruaki): The 29-year-old vice-captain and operations strategist of SKaRD, born on October 21, 1993. He is portrayed by Yuki Ito (伊藤 祐輝, Itō Yūki).
- Special Tactical Armored Kaiju Earth Garon (特戦獣 アースガロン, Tokusenjū Āsu Garon): (Note: Short for Type 23 Special Tactical Armored Kaiju (23式特殊戦術機甲獣, Nī San-shiki Tokushu Senjutsu Kikō-jū).) SKaRD's giant kaiju-type robot nicknamed Earthy (アーくん, Ā-kun). It is equipped with the Earth Fire (アースファイア, Āsu Faia) charged particle cannon in its mouth, the Earth Gun (アースガン, Āsu Gan) autocannons on each hand, and the five-cell Tail VLS (テイルVLS, Teiru Bui Eru Esu) on its tail. The voice interactive AI system, EGOISS (イーゴイス, Īgoisu), is later installed on Earth Garon. During the events of the manga spin-off, Earth Garon is equipped with the pressure diving suit, AO-PDS, and the underground excavation unit, AO-UEU. It is voiced by Akira Ishida (石田 彰, Ishida Akira).
  - Earth Garon Mod.2 (アースガロンMod.2, Āsu Garon Moddo Tsū): Equipped with the Mod.2 Unit (Mod.2ユニット, Moddo Tsū Yunitto) (Note: Also known as the Special Combat Support Unit (特殊戦闘支援ユニット, Tokushu Sentō Shien Yunitto).) on its back, which grants the Rail Cannon (レールキャノン, Rēru Kyanon) and the Multipurpose Laser (多目的レーザー, Tamokuteki Rēzā) cannon.
  - Earth Garon Mod.3 (アースガロンMod.3, Āsu Garon Moddo Surī): Equipped with the Mod.3 Unit (Mod.3ユニット, Moddo Surī Yunitto) (Note: Also known as the Special Flight Support Unit (特殊飛行支援ユニット, Tokushu Hikō Shien Yunitto).) on its back, which grants the Uranus Drive (ウラヌスドライブ, Uranusu Doraibu) propulsion system.
  - Earth Garon Mod.4 (アースガロンMod.4, Āsu Garon Moddo Fō): Equipped with the Mod.2 and Mod.3 Units.

=== GGFJ ===
The Global Guardian Force Japan (地球防衛隊日本支部, Chikyū Bōei-tai Nihon Shibu; GGFJ) is the Japanese branch of the Global Guardian Force, an organization authorized to deal against kaiju and headquartered in North America.

- Retsu Haruno (ハルノ レツ, Haruno Retsu): (Note: The names of Retsu Haruno and Tatsuki Aobe are written in kanji as 榛野 烈 and 蒼辺 樹, respectively.) The 56-year-old Chief of Staff of GGFJ Command and founder of SKaRD who is Gento's superior. He later took full responsibility for SKaRD's disruption of the GGFJ's operation and was relieved of duty. In Ultraman Blazar the Movie: Tokyo Kaiju Showdown, he has been promoted to the Commander of GGFJ Command to replace Genkawa. He is portrayed by Masaya Kato (加藤 雅也, Katō Masaya).
- Isozaki (磯崎), Komatsubara (小松原), Moriguchi (守口), Murota (室田), and Kisaragi (如月): Members of the First Special Mobile Team (第1特殊機動団, Dai Ichi Tokushu Kidō-dan), to which Gento belonged before his transfer to SKaRD. They are portrayed by Takashi Nishina (仁科 貴, Nishina Takashi), Kenji Shio (塩 顕治, Shio Kenji), Hideki Kitano (北野 秀気, Kitano Hideki), Kazuhiro Yoda (養田 和裕, Yōda Kazuhiro), and Taihei Nishi (西 泰平, Nishi Taihei), respectively.
- Hirano (ヒラノ): A head of weapons development. He is portrayed by Keitoku Ito (伊藤 慶徳, Itō Keitoku).
- Minoru Genkawa (源川 稔, Genkawa Minoru): Commander of GGFJ Command. He is portrayed by Taro Kawano (川野 太郎, Kawano Tarō).
- Tatsuki Aobe (アオベ タツキ, Aobe Tatsuki): Emi Aobe's father and a scientist, who died three years ago. He is portrayed by Ryosuke Watabe (渡部 遼介, Watabe Ryōsuke).
- Goda (ゴウダ, Gōda): A captain of the Facilities Security Forces. He is portrayed by Tetsu Hijikata (土方 鉄, Hijikata Tetsu).

=== Ultraman Blazar ===
Ultraman Blazar (ウルトラマンブレーザー, Urutoraman Burēzā) is the titular Ultra of the series who came from Blazar M421. His finishing move is Spiral Burrade (スパイラルバレード, Supairaru Barēdo), a spear made of energy that he can manipulate in various ways. During the battle against Varallon, Blazar is able to fire a Blazar Beam (ンブレーザー光線, Burēzā Kōsen) from his left hand using Gento's wedding ring and a bracelet his son gifted him as a catalyst. He can harness the power of monsters through the use of their Stones, such as a Rainbow Slash (レインボー光輪, Reinbō Kōrin) energy buzzsaw through the power of Nijikagachi, the Tilsonite Sword (チルソナイトソード, Chirusonaito Sōdo) through the power of Garamon, and the Firdran Armor (ファードランアーマー, Fādoran Āmā) through the power of Firdran, which can change the Tilsonite Sword into the Tilsofird Lancer (チルソファードランサー, Chirusofādo Ransā) double-bladed sword. He is voiced by Hideyoshi Iwata (岩田 栄慶, Iwata Hideyoshi), who also plays the Ultra.

=== Minor characters ===
- Reiko Kiyoshimadaira (キヨシマダイラ レイコ, Kiyoshimadaira Reiko): A reporter of television station TKB. She is portrayed by Maasa Kitamura (北村 まあさ, Kitamura Maasa).
- Okawa (大川, Ōkawa): A physicist at the Teaterium Energy Fusion Institute (ティーテリウムエネルギー融合研究所, Tīteriumu Enerugī Yūgō Kenkyū-jo). He is portrayed by Tomokazu Seki (関 智一, Seki Tomokazu).
- Satoko Hiruma (ヒルマ サトコ, Hiruma Satoko): Gento Hiruma's wife of his age. In Ultraman Blazar the Movie: Tokyo Kaiju Showdown, she is pregnant with her second child. She is portrayed by Maya Okano (岡野 真也, Okano Maya).
- Jun Hiruma (ヒルマ ジュン, Hiruma Jun): Gento's 7-year-old son. He is portrayed by Haru Iwakawa (岩川 晴, Iwakawa Haru).
- Hiroshi Sonezaki (曽根崎 浩, Sonezaki Hiroshi): The CEO of the major chemical company Novaio (ノヴァイオ) who used to be in GGF Chemical Department until 18 years ago. He is portrayed by Kazuki Tsujimoto (辻本 一樹, Tsujimoto Kazuki).
- Mizuho (ミズホ): Anri Minami's childhood friend who lives in her hometown. She is portrayed by Asaka Yamada (山田 朝華, Yamada Asaka). As a child, she is portrayed by Seira Takatori (高取 青依良, Takatori Seira).
- Saburota Terashimazu (テラシマヅ サブロウタ, Terashimazu Saburōta) and Takuma Nihonmatsu (ニホンマツ タクマ, Nihonmatsu Takuma): Directors of TKB. They are portrayed by Hachizo Hino (火野 蜂三, Hino Hachizō) and Yuta (優太, Yūta), respectively.
- Kazunori Yokomine (横峯 万象, Yokomine Kazunori): A leading kaiju researcher, a former GGF Academy professor, and Gento's former teacher from school. He is portrayed by Kozo Sato (佐藤 貢三, Satō Kōzō). As a child, he is portrayed by Ken Fujii (藤井 健, Fujii Ken).
- Yu Dobashi (ドバシ ユウ, Dobashi Yū): (Note: The names of Yu Dobashi, Tetsuo Suzuki, Michiko Tanaka, and Ichiro Mabuse are written in kanji as 土橋 祐, 鈴木 哲男, 田中 道子, and 真伏 一郎, respectively.) The former director of GGFJ and the former manager of Test Facility 66 of the Space Systems Research Center (宇宙装備研究所第66実験施設, Uchū Sōbi Kenkyū-jo Dai Rokujū-roku Jikken Shisetsu) who is revealed to be the orchestrator of the V99 conspiracy that occurred in 1999. He is portrayed by Minori Terada (寺田 農, Terada Minori).
- Arata (アラタ) and Tsumugi (ツムギ): Jun Hiruma's classmate and his younger sister, respectively. They are portrayed by Luca Damasceno Takei (武井 ダマセノ 瑠珂, Takei Damaseno Ruka) and Nene Iwakami (岩上 希音, Iwakami Nene), respectively.
- Tsutomu Nishizaki (西崎 勉, Nishizaki Tsutomu): An astrophysicist and former teammate of Tatsuki Aobe. He is portrayed by Daisuke Nagakura (永倉 大輔, Nagakura Daisuke).
- Shogo Nagura (ナグラ ショウゴ, Nagura Shōgo) and Masaaki Nagura (ナグラ マサアキ, Nagura Masaaki): Teruaki Nagura's father and older brother, respectively, and farmers. They are portrayed by Yoshihiro Nozoe (野添 義弘, Nozoe Yoshihiro) and Kenji Masaki (柾 賢志, Masaki Kenji), respectively.
- Tetsuo Suzuki (スズキ テツオ, Suzuki Tetsuo): A kaiju damage insurance agent. He is portrayed by Yuta Kanai (金井 勇太, Kanai Yūta).
- Michiko Tanaka (タナカ ミチコ, Tanaka Michiko): A homeowner Tetsuo Suzuki pitches a sales to. She is portrayed by Karin Yamaguchi (山口 果林, Yamaguchi Karin).
- Michihiro Oikawa (追川 光宙, Oikawa Michihiro): A 27-year-old amateur astronomer. He is portrayed by Takuya Nakayama (中山 卓也, Nakayama Takuya).
- Ichiro Mabuse (マブセ イチロウ, Mabuse Ichirō): A chemist and the CEO of the advanced chemical company Necromass Co. (ネクロマス社, Nekuromasu-sha). He is portrayed by Kisuke Iida (飯田 基祐, Iida Kisuke).
- Yuki Mabuse (マブセ ユウキ, Mabuse Yūki): Ichiro Mabuse's only son and a prodigy who causes an incident under the identity of a fictitious alien, Phantom Alien Alien Damuno (幻影宇宙人 ダムノー星人, Gen'ei Uchū-jin Damunō Seijin). He is portrayed by Ritsuto Morishima (森島 律斗, Morishima Ritsuto). As a 6-year-old child, he is portrayed by Taishin Miyazaki (宮崎 太真, Miyazaki Taishin).
- Nito (ニトウ, Nitō): A Necromass employee who works as an industrial spy for another company. He is portrayed by Miou Tanaka (田中 美央, Tanaka Miō).

=== Monsters and aliens ===
- Space Crustacean Monster Bazanga (宇宙甲殻怪獣 バザンガ, Uchū Kōkaku Kaijū Bazanga): An alien monster sent by an alien race codenamed the V99.
- Abyssal Monster Gedos (深海怪獣 ゲードス, Shinkai Kaijū Gēdosu):
- Coleopteran Monster Taganular (甲虫怪獣 タガヌラー, Kōchū Kaijū Taganurā):
- Molluscan Monster Leviera (軟体怪獣 レヴィーラ, Nantai Kaijū Revīra):
- Mountain Monster Dorgo (山怪獣 ドルゴ, Yama Kaijū Dorugo): (Note: The names of Dorgo and Nijikagachi are written in kanji as 土留牛 and 虹蛇神, respectively.)
- Aurora Phantom Alien Cannan "Herbie" and "Robie" (オーロラ怪人 カナン星人 ハービー ロビー, Ōrora Kaijin Cannan Seijin Hābī Robī): Herbie is voiced by Ayako Takeuchi (竹内 絢子, Takeuchi Ayako), and their race first appeared in episode 24 of Ultraseven.
- Iridescent Monster Nijikagachi (天弓怪獣 ニジカガチ, Tenkyū Kaijū Nijikagachi): An very powerful monster that was revered as a deity in ancient times. In the present it was used to reset the humanity.
- Robot Monster Garamon (ロボット怪獣 ガラモン, Robotto Kaijū Garamon): First appeared in episode 13 of Ultra Q.
- Space Phantom Cicadaman (宇宙怪人 セミ人間, Uchū Kaijin Semi Ningen): Aliens who assume the human identities of Hoichi Tsukushi (ツクシ ホウイチ, Tsukushi Hōichi), Chicchi Kuroiwa (クロイワ チッチ, Kuroiwa Chitchi), Michi Niize (ニイゼ ミチ, Niize Michi), and Kanade Higurashi (ヒグラシ カナデ, Higurashi Kanade). (Note: Their names are written in kanji as 筑士 芳一, 黒岩 チッチ, 新瀬 三智, and 日暮 奏, respectively.) They are portrayed by Hideki Togi (東儀 秀樹, Tōgi Hideki), Norichika Togi (東儀 典親, Tōgi Norichika), Kon Shirasu (白須 今, Shirasu Kon), and Hiroaki Tsutsumi (堤 博明, Tsutsumi Hiroaki), respectively, and their race first appeared in episode 16 of Ultra Q.
- Molten Iron Monster Demaaga (熔鉄怪獣 デマーガ, Yōtetsu Kaijū Demāga): First appeared in episode 1 of Ultraman X.
- Molten Iron Monster Baby Demaaga (熔鉄怪獣 ベビーデマーガ, Yōtetsu Kaijū Bebī Demāga):
- Space Electromagnetic Monster Gebalga (宇宙電磁怪獣 ゲバルガ, Uchū Denji Kaijū Gebaruga): An alien monster sent by the V99.
- Moonlight Monster Deltandal (月光怪獣 デルタンダル, Gekkō Kaijū Derutandaru): (Note: Also known as Deltandal F. F is short for fighter.)
- Two-Dimensional Monster Gavadon (二次元怪獣 ガヴァドン, Nijigen Kaijū Gavadon): (Note: Also known as Gavadon (A).) First appeared in episode 15 of Ultraman.
- Vision Monster Mogusion (幻視怪獣 モグージョン, Genshi Kaijū Mogūjon):
- Digital Life Form Pag (電脳生物 パグ, Den'nō Seibutsu Pagu): (Note: Short for Perfect Analyze Gadget.) He is voiced by Masatomo Nakazawa (中澤 まさとも, Nakazawa Masatomo).
- Abyssal Monster Little Gedos (深海怪獣 げ～どすくん, Shinkai Kaijū Gēdosu-kun): He is voiced by Shun Horie (堀江 瞬, Horie Shun).
- Vision Monster Little Mogusion (幻視怪獣 もぐ～じょんちゃん, Genshi Kaijū Mogūjon-chan): She is voiced by Konomi Kohara (小原 好美, Kohara Konomi).
- Space Samurai Zangill (宇宙侍 ザンギル, Uchū-zamurai Zangiru): A ronin from outer space who was slain by Zamsher in a duel long ago. However, as a spirit, he is given a redemption mission to slay 100 monsters' souls. He is portrayed by Mitsuru Karahashi (唐橋 充, Mitsuru Karahashi).
- Space Swordsman Zamsher (宇宙剣豪 ザムシャー, Uchū Kengō Zamushā): First appeared in episode 16 of Ultraman Mebius.
- Pollution Monster Irugo (汚染獣 イルーゴ, Osenjū Irūgo): The larval form of Brood Gebalga which has the ability to emit toxic gas from its mouth.
- Advanced Space Pollution Monster Brood Gebalga (宇宙汚染超獣 ブルードゲバルガ, Uchū Osen Chōjū Burūdo Gebaruga): An alien monster sent by the V99.
- Fire Dragon Monster Firdran (炎竜怪獣 ファードラン, Enryū Kaijū Fādoran): A phoenix-like monster whom Blazar fuses with to achieve his armored form, Firdran Armor.
- Subterranean Insectile Monster Zugugan (地底甲獣 ズグガン, Chitei Kōjū Zugugan):
- Moonlight Monster Deltandal B (月光怪獣 デルタンダルB, Gekkō Kaijū Derutandaru Bī): (Note: B is short for bomber.)
- Skull Monster Red King II (どくろ怪獣 レッドキング(二代目), Dokuro Kaijū Reddo Kingu (Ni-daime)): First appeared in episode 25 of Ultraman.
- Freezing Monster Guigass (冷凍怪獣 ギガス, Reitō Kaijū Gigasu): First appeared in episode 25 of Ultraman.
- Space Bomber Monster Varallon (宇宙爆弾怪獣 ヴァラロン, Uchū Bakudan Kaijū Vararon): The final antagonist of the series and an alien monster sent by the V99. The monsters on Earth launched an attack on it as a response to its arrival at the series' climax.
- Space Emperor Alien Bado (宇宙帝王 バド星人, Uchū Teiō Bado Seijin): First appeared in episode 19 of Ultraseven.
- Transforming Phantom Alien Pitt (変身怪人 ピット星人, Henshin Kaijin Pitto Seijin): First appeared in episode 3 of Ultraseven.
- Specter Phantom Alien Ghose (幽霊怪人 ゴース星人, Yūrei Kaijin Gōsu Seijin): First appeared in episode 48 of Ultraseven.
- Space Monster Eleking (宇宙怪獣 エレキング, Uchū Kaijū Erekingu): First appeared in episode 3 of Ultraseven.
- Twin-Headed Monster Pandon (双頭怪獣 パンドン, Sōtō Kaijū Pandon): First appeared in episode 48 of Ultraseven.
- Three-Faced Phantom Dada (三面怪人 ダダ, Sanmen Kaijin Dada): First appeared in episode 28 of Ultraman.

Film-exclusive

- DemoniCarcass Monster Gongilgan (妖骸魔獣 ゴンギルガン, Yōgai Majū Gongirugan):

Manga-exclusives

- Despot Monster Tyrant (暴君怪獣 タイラント, Bōkun Kaijū Tairanto; Announcement): First appeared in episode 40 of Ultraman Taro.
- Vampire Seaweed Jaranga (吸血海藻 ジャランガ, Kyūketsu Kaisō Jaranga):
- Herculean Monster King Silvergon (剛力怪獣 キングシルバゴン, Gōriki Kaijū Kingu Shirubagon; SP): First appeared in Great Decisive Battle! The Super 8 Ultra Brothers.
- Sea Monster King Guesra (海獣 キングゲスラ, Kaijū Kingu Gesura; SP): First appeared in episode Great Decisive Battle! The Super 8 Ultra Brothers.
- Ancient Monster Kingsaurus III (古代怪獣 キングザウルス三世, Kodai Kaijū Kinguzaurusu San-sei; SP): First appeared in episode 4 of Return of Ultraman.
- Space Robot King Joe (宇宙ロボット キングジョー, Uchū Robotto Kingu Jō; SP): First appeared in episode 14 of Ultraseven.

== Episodes ==
No.	Title	Directed by	Written by	Original release date
SP	"Ultraman Blazar Preview Special"; Transliteration: "Urutoraman Burēzā Chokuzen Supesharu" (Japanese: ウルトラマンブレーザー直前スペシャル)	N/A	N/A	July 1, 2023
1	"First Wave"; Transliteration: "Fāsuto Weibu" (Japanese: ファースト・ウェイブ)	Kiyotaka Taguchi	Keigo Koyanagi	July 8, 2023
2	"The Man Who Created SKaRD"; Transliteration: "Sukādo o Tsukutta Otoko" (Japanese: SKaRDを作った男)	Kiyotaka Taguchi	Keigo Koyanagi	July 15, 2023
3	"The Name Is Earth Garon"; Transliteration: "Sono Na wa Āsu Garon" (Japanese: その名はアースガロン)	Kiyotaka Taguchi	Keigo Koyanagi	July 22, 2023
4	"Thus Fought Emi"; Transliteration: "Emi, Kaku Tatakeri" (Japanese: エミ、かく戦えり)	Takanori Tsujimoto	Jun Tsugita	July 29, 2023
5	"The Mountain Roars"; Transliteration: "Yama ga Hoeru" (Japanese: 山が吠える)	Takanori Tsujimoto	Jun Tsugita	August 5, 2023
SP	"Uncover the True Identity of the Giant Creatures"; Transliteration: "Kyodai Seibutsu no Shōtai o Oe" (Japanese: 巨大生物の正体を追え)	N/A	N/A	August 12, 2023
6	"The Invading Aurora"; Transliteration: "Shinryaku no Ōrora" (Japanese: 侵略のオーロラ)	Takanori Tsujimoto	Jun Tsugita	August 19, 2023
7	"Rainbow Appears: Part 1"; Transliteration: "Niji ga Deta Zenpen" (Japanese: 虹が出た 前編)	Kazuhiro Nakagawa	Taiki Yamazaki	August 26, 2023
8	"Rainbow Appears: Part 2"; Transliteration: "Niji ga Deta Kōhen" (Japanese: 虹が出た 後編)	Kazuhiro Nakagawa	Taiki Yamazaki	September 2, 2023
9	"Planet of Music"; Transliteration: "Oto no Hoshi" (Japanese: オトノホシ)	Tomonobu Koshi	Sumio Uetake	September 9, 2023
10	"Parent and Child"; Transliteration: "Oya to Ko" (Japanese: 親と子)	Tomonobu Koshi	Sumio Uetake	September 16, 2023
11	"Escape"; Transliteration: "Esukēpu" (Japanese: エスケープ)	Masayoshi Takesue	Junichiro Ashiki	September 23, 2023
12	"Let's Go, Blazar!"; Transliteration: "Iku zo Burēzā!" (Japanese: いくぞブレーザー！)	Masayoshi Takesue	Junichiro Ashiki	September 30, 2023
13	"SKaRD Nocturne"; Transliteration: "Sukādo Nokutān" (Japanese: スカードノクターン)	Ryuta Miyazaki	Junichiro Ashiki	October 7, 2023
14	"Moonlit Memories"; Transliteration: "Gekka no Kioku" (Japanese: 月下の記憶)	Kiyotaka Taguchi	Keigo Koyanagi	October 14, 2023
15	"Betwixt Morn and Dusk"; Transliteration: "Asa to Yoru no Aida ni" (Japanese: 朝と夜の間に)	Kiyotaka Taguchi	Takao Nakano	October 21, 2023
16	"Terror from the Underground"; Transliteration: "Kyōfu wa Chitei yori" (Japanese: 恐怖は地底より)	Takanori Tsujimoto	Jun Tsugita	October 28, 2023
SP	"Blazar Digital Picture Scroll"; Transliteration: "Burēzā Den'nō Emaki" (Japanese: ブレーザー電脳絵巻)	N/A	N/A	November 4, 2023
17	"The Wanderling Zangill"; Transliteration: "Sasurai no Zangiru" (Japanese: さすらいのザンギル)	Takanori Tsujimoto	Jun Tsugita	November 11, 2023
18	"The Towering Terror"; Transliteration: "Sobietatsu Kyōfu" (Japanese: そびえ立つ恐怖)	Tomonobu Koshi	Jun Tsugita	November 18, 2023
19	"Light and Flame"; Transliteration: "Hikari to Honō" (Japanese: 光と炎)	Tomonobu Koshi	Jun Tsugita	November 25, 2023
20	"Night of Insects Chirping"; Transliteration: "Mushi no Ne no Yoru" (Japanese: 虫の音の夜)	Masayoshi Takesue	Toshizo Nemoto	December 2, 2023
21	"Battle in the Sky"; Transliteration: "Tenkū no Gekisen" (Japanese: 天空の激戦)	Masayoshi Takesue	Toshizo Nemoto	December 9, 2023
22	"Insurance Hero"; Transliteration: "Sonpo Hīrō" (Japanese: ソンポヒーロー)	Kazuhiro Nakagawa	Junichiro Ashiki	December 16, 2023
23	"Visitor 99"; Transliteration: "Vijitā Kyū Kyū" (Japanese: ヴィジター99)	Kazuhiro Nakagawa	Keigo Koyanagi	December 23, 2023
SP	"Pag's Ultra Lecture"; Transliteration: "Pagu no Urutora Dangi" (Japanese: パグのウルトラ談義)	N/A	N/A	January 6, 2024
24	"The Approaching Third Wave"; Transliteration: "Dai San-pa Sekkin Shūrai" (Japanese: 第3波接近襲来)	Kiyotaka Taguchi	Keigo Koyanagi	January 13, 2024
25	"The Ones Who Embrace the Earth"; Transliteration: "Chikyū o Idaku Mono-tachi" (Japanese: 地球を抱くものたち)	Kiyotaka Taguchi	Keigo Koyanagi	January 20, 2024

== Film ==
Ultraman Blazar The Movie: Tokyo Kaiju Showdown (ウルトラマンブレーザー THE MOVIE 大怪獣首都激突, Urutoraman Burēzā Za Mūbī Dai Kaijū Shuto Gekitotsu) is a film released in Japanese theaters on February 23, 2024.

== Spin-offs ==
- Ultraman Blazar: A manga spin-off with the same title as the series that has been serialized on Tsuburaya Imagination and Shogakukan's online manga websites Televi-Kun Super Hero Comics and Weekly CoroCoro Comic. A special episode is titled Showdown!! The King Monster Army (大決戦!!キング怪獣軍団, Dai Kessen!! Kingu Kaijū Gundan). (Note: A bonus manga booklet included with the February/March 2024 issue of Televi-Kun.)
- Ultraman Blazar The Movie Special Voice Drama (ウルトラマンブレーザー THE MOVIE スペシャルボイスドラマ, Urutoraman Burēzā Za Mūbī Supesharu Boisu Dorama): A two-episode audio drama distributed through a QR code for Tsuburaya Imagination members who attended movie screenings. It serves as a direct sequel to Ultraman Blazar The Movie: Tokyo Kaiju Showdown.
1. Tokyo Kaiju Extermination Operation (首都直下撃滅作戦, Shuto Chokka Gekimetsu Sakusen)
2. SKaRD's Smoldering Night (SKaRDの燻される夜, Sukādo no Ibusareru Yoru)
- SKaRD Break Room (SKaRD休憩室, Sukādo Kyūkeishitsu): A spin-off included as part of the second Blu-ray release of Ultraman Blazar. It focuses on Anri Minami, Yasunobu Bando, and Teruaki Nagura.
1. I'll Do This Exercise (この体操は俺がやる, Kono Taisō wa Ore ga Yaru)
2. Incompletion SOS (中途半端SOS, Chūtohanpa Esu Ō Esu)
3. Mother of SKaRD Is Like the Sun (スカードの母は太陽のように, Sukādo no Haha wa Taiyō no Yō ni)
4. Breach Your Stage Fright! (舞台恐怖症 突破せよ！, Butai Kyōfushō Toppa Seyo!)
5. Operation Surprise Zero (サプライズ0指令, Sapuraizu Zero Shirei)

== Production ==
Produced by Tsuburaya Productions, Ultraman Blazar was first trademarked and registered by the company on December 20, 2022, and published on December 28, 2022. The series was officially announced on April 21, 2023, alongside a sneak peek of both the titular Ultra and its human host Gento Hiruma. An official press conference was later held on June 12, 2023, which revealed more information on the main cast as well as the kaiju featured in the series.

Series director Kiyotaka Taguchi stated in an interview in Uchusen that he was once approached by Tsuburaya to produce a series that will follow after Ultraman Decker and it will be based on Ultraman Gaia, which is celebrating its 25th anniversary. But he decided that he declined making an anniversary season for Gaia, stating the ambitious attempt to try to replicate a show that is already a good Ultra series. He said that "Around the summer of 2021, President Masayuki Nagatake of Tsuburaya Productions invited me out for a meal and said he wanted to talk to me. At that time, Ultraman Trigger: New Generation Tiga was already in production. 'Do you want to be the main director for the next project?' President Nagatake asked. At that moment, I thought it would be 'New Generation Gaia,' but even now, 'Gaia' is an extremely ambitious work. 'Given the current state of TV series production, it's impossible to surpass that work no matter how you think about it.' I always believed that. I didn't want to lose such a battle, and I didn't think I was the right person for it." Taguchi decided that for the next series, everything will be done from the ground up that totally feels fresh while focusing less on gimmicks such as form changes and more on original kaiju suits instead of recycling old ones. His concept on Blazar is also different to that of other Ultras, as it is not related to the M78 Nebula but as a character born in a different galaxy. In his interview in Tsuburaya Imagination, he said that he made Blazar to be ideologically similar to Gaia overall and break away from the world view of the previous two works for it to portray "hard science fiction".

== Cast ==
- Gento Hiruma: Tomoya Warabino
- Emi Aobe: Himena Tsukimiya
- Anri Minami: Konomi Naito
- Yasunobu Bando: Hayate Kajihara
- Teruaki Nagura: Yuki Ito
- Retsu Haruno: Masaya Kato

=== Voice cast ===
- Ultraman Blazar: Hideyoshi Iwata
- Earthy: Akira Ishida
- Narrator: Genki Yoshimoto (吉本 元喜, Yoshimoto Genki)

=== Guest cast ===
- Okawa (3): Tomokazu Seki
- Hoichi Tsukushi (9): Hideki Togi
- Minoru Genkawa (11–12, 23–25): Taro Kawano
- Yu Dobashi (14, 18–19, 24–25): Minori Terada
- Scruffy (ヒゲ, Hige; 15): Taro Suwa (諏訪 太朗, Suwa Tarō)
- Zangill (17): Mitsuru Karahashi
- Tetsuo Suzuki (スズキ テツオ, Suzuki Tetsuo; 22): Yuta Kanai (金井 勇太, Kanai Yūta).
- Michiko Tanaka (タナカ ミチコ, Tanaka Michiko; 22): Karin Yamaguchi (山口 果林, Yamaguchi Karin).

=== English dubbing cast ===
- Johnny Yong Bosch as Gento Hiruma
- Madeline Dorroh as Emi Aobe
- Ricco Fajardo as Yasunobu Bando
- Madeleine Morris as Anri Minami
- Nicholas Andrew Louie as Teruaki Nagura
- Keith Silverstein as Retsu Haruno
- Clifford Chapin as Earthy

== Theme songs ==
Opening theme

- "Bokura no Spectra" (僕らのスペクトラ, Bokura no Supekutora; "Our Spectra")
  - Lyrics: Shito (シト)
  - Composition & Arrangement: Takumi Ozawa (尾澤 拓実, Ozawa Takumi) (from ReReGRAPHICS)
  - Artist: Hiroshi Kitadani (きただに ひろし, Kitadani Hiroshi)
  - Episodes: 2–24

Ending themes

- "BLACK STAR"
  - Lyrics: SACHIKO
  - Composition & Arrangement: Hisashi Koyama (小山 寿, Koyama Hisashi)
  - Artist: MindaRyn
  - Episodes: 2–13
- "Brave Blazar"
  - Lyrics, Composition, & Arrangement: Technoboys Pulcraft Green-Fund
  - Artist: Technoboys Pulcraft Green-Fund feat. MindaRyn
  - Episodes: 14–25
- "Ultra Q Main Theme" (『ウルトラQ』メインテーマ, Urutora Kyū Mein Tēma)
  - Composition: Kunio Miyauchi (宮内 國郎, Miyauchi Kunio)
  - Arrangement: Hideki Togi
  - Episodes: 9

== International broadcast ==
In Malaysia, this series began airing on Astro Ceria on the same date after the broadcast in Japan at 8:30 pm, with Malay-language dubs.

In Indonesia, this series began airing on RTV on July 14, 2023, with Indonesian dubs.

In Hong Kong, this series will begin airing on ViuTV on July 15, 2023, with Cantonese dubs.

In Philippines, this series will be air on TV5 in 2025 with Filipino dubbed.

Internationally outside of Southeast Asia, the series was uploaded on YouTube with a sub, and for the first time in Ultra Series history, the series is airing with an English simuldub, utilizing YouTube's new audio track feature.

== See also ==
- Ultra Series - Complete list of official Ultraman-related shows.
