= Seventeen (Yokoyama novel) =

2003 novel by Hideo Yokoyama

Seventeen (クライマーズ・ハイ, Kuraimāzu hai; Climber's High) is a 2003 novel by Hideo Yokoyama, published by Bungeishunjū. The English translation was done by Louise Heal Kawai, published in 2018 by Riverrun.

This is Yokoyama's second novel to receive an English translation.

Due to the lack of a criminal act and due to a lack of mystery, Tara Cheesman stated that the work is "not a thriller, per se" in the American point of view.

== Background ==
Yokoyama had worked as an investigative journalist covering the Japan Air Lines Flight 123 affair. Upon realizing that people may forget important news events, he decided to change his career to writing.

Kawai stated that it took about six months to write a draft of the English translation, and that she had to do background research on the events.

== Plot ==
It is about Kazumasa Yuuki (悠木 和雅, Yūki Kazumasa), a news reporter trying to deal with the fallout from Japan Air Lines Flight 123, a 1985 aircraft disaster. The opening portion of the novel is Yuuki revisiting the crash site in 2003, but most of the work covers Yuuki's role in the events during 1985, when the crash occurred and when Yuuki investigated the crash. The narrative alternates between the two time periods, which are seventeen years apart.

In the 1985 portions Yuuki worked for the North Kanto Times (NKT), a fictional newspaper. His company urged him to take the JAL123 assignment because Yuuki had hiterto refused to be promoted to a managerial role, something the company had disliked. Yuuki was supposed to go climbing on Mount Tanigawa with a friend that day, but not only was he covering the JAL123 incident, but his friend had a medical incident and ended up in a coma. The disaster also showed how different people working for the North Kanto Times reacted differently to the events. Yuuki had to navigate and respond to ethical dilemmas in his profession.

In the "present" portion of the novel, Yuuki takes his friend's son on Mount Tanigawa. Additionally, Yuuki had at one time abused his son, and in the "present" parts of the novel, is trying to mend his relationship with him.

== Reception ==
Iain Maloney of The Japan Times described it as "fantastic" and a "page turner".

Tom Nolan of the Wall Street Journal wrote that he agreed with the advertising of the novel being, in the advertisement's words, "tense, powerful".

Tara Wilson Redd wrote in the Washington Times that at times there is "dryness", particularly regarding descriptions of the journalism business; she argued the conclusion makes the book worth reading through more boring portions.

Publishers Weekly wrote that the work is "engrossing" and "accessible".

== Adaptation ==
There is a film adaptation, titled Climber's High.

== See also ==
Other works by Yokoyama:

- Prefecture D
- Six Four

Other works about JAL123:

- Dealing with Disaster in Japan - A non-fiction book

Other books translated by Louise Kawai:

- The Cat Who Saved Books
- Ms Ice Sandwich
