= Six Four =

2012 novel by Hideo Yokoyama

- Author: Hideo Yokoyama
- Original title: ロクヨン
- Translator: Jonathan Lloyd-Davies
- Language: Japanese
- Series: Prefecture D Series
- Genre: Crime thriller, mystery
- Publisher: Bungeishunjū
- Publication date: October 25, 2012
- Publication place: Japan
- English publication date: February 7, 2017
- Media type: Print
- Pages: 576–656 pages depending on publisher
- ISBN: 1250160006
- Followed by: Prefecture D

Six Four (ロクヨン, Rokuyon) is a crime/mystery novel written by Hideo Yokoyama in Japanese and published in 2012. It was the first of his novels to be translated into English. The novel follows a former detective, Yoshinobu Mikami, who has been moved into Administrative Affairs and placed in charge of Media Relations, as he prepares for a visit from one of the top police officials in Japan. In fulfilling his duties, Mikami is plagued by conflicts with the media, with his colleagues in Administrative Affairs, and with the detectives with whom he used to work in Criminal Investigations.

The title Six Four refers to the year Shōwa 64 during which the main case took place. This is not a Gregorian calendar year but a year in the Japanese imperial era naming system, nengō. The Gregorian calendar date for Shōwa 64 is 1989, the last year of the Shōwa period (1926-1989).

== Plot ==
The novel opens with Mikami and his wife Minako meeting with a regional captain to examine a body of a young female that could be his daughter, Ayumi, who had run away from home. The body is not his daughter's.

The next day, Mikami dwells on his current job in Media Relations at the police headquarters and plans to eventually return to his former post in Criminal Investigations. At the office, he finds that members of the press have congregated to ask that Mikami release the name of the female driver involved in a fatal car accident because they are making a stand on anonymity. Mikami then goes to Akama's office, where he is informed of a special visit from the commissioner general to the family of the Six Four case, a fourteen-year-old kidnapping case of a young girl that is regarded as the police department’s biggest failure. Mikami visits the father of the victim, Amamiya, but he refuses to allow the visit.

Back in his office, Mikami learns that the press club is submitting a written protest to the captain for the release of the woman’s name. To distract them from the issue, Mikami meets with a member of the press club and tells him about bid-rigging charges against Hakkaku Construction. His plan fails, and the press club goes to deliver the protest to the captain. Mikami physically blocks their way, and they subsequently declare their intention to boycott the commissioner’s visit. Mikami visits Criminal Investigations and unexpectedly finds out about a gag order, which makes him suspicious.

Mikami then visits multiple different people he knew from his time in Criminal Investigations to find out about the Six Four case. He visits the home of Hiyoshi, a former forensics worker who worked on Six Four, and talks with his mother, who reveals how disastrous Hiyoshi’s life has become after the failed case. Mikami leaves a note for Hiyoshi before leaving to visit another officer, Kakinuma. Kakinuma tells Mikami about the Koda Memo, an account of a call by the kidnapper during the Six Four case that was covered up because the police messed up the recording. Mikami visits Amamiya again and convinces him to accept the commissioner's visit. Mikami then receives a call from Suwa informing him that the press situation is worsening. Mikami receives a call from an officer named Urushibara asking what he did to the former police detective Koda, who is now missing. At the end of the call, Urushibara tells Mikami to see Arakida in the police HQ.

Mikami learns from Arakida that the true purpose of the commissioner’s visit is for the National Police Agency to absorb the job of Director of Criminal Investigations in the police HQ. Mikami visits a higher-up named Captain Tsujiuchi and tries to argue for the retention of the role with Criminal Investigations, but Tsujiuchi dismisses him.

The next day, Mikami tells his co-workers that he plans on removing the anonymous reporting of crimes. He agrees to tell the press everything about the vehicular manslaughter case, but stress the importance of anonymity in special cases. After Mikami finishes his announcement, he asks the press to cover the visit with Amamiya. The press club eventually agrees.

Mikami is told that there has been another kidnapping. As part of the administrative affairs department, he is responsible for informing the press of the case, which is strikingly similar to the Six Four case. Mikami then goes to station G to ask Matsuoka for details. Matsuoka gives Mikami the name of the father of the victim, Mesaki, and his store address, but nothing else. Mikami asks to join the police in the mobile command center that will monitor Mesaki as he delivers the ransom money to the kidnapper and is granted permission. In the middle of the observation, an officer reports that the missing girl, Kasumi, was found in police custody in Genbu city for shoplifting. After a short while, Matsuoka reveals to Mikami that this kidnapping was actually an extension of the Six-Four investigation. As Mesaki arrives at the Ai’ai Hair Salon to pay the ransom, the kidnapper speaks to him on the phone. Mikami recognizes the voice of the "kidnapper" on the phone as Koda. Koda instructs Mesaki to put all of the money into an oil drum and burn it, then to read a note from Amamiya. Mesaki's wife calls to tell him his daughter wasn’t kidnapped and was actually at the police station. Mesaki tears and eats the top half of the note before anyone can read it. Mikami then realizes this was a set-up to out Mesaki as the kidnapper in the original Six-Four case.

The next week, Media Relations and the press debate about the decision to keep the suspected Six Four kidnapper Mesaki's home address anonymous.

The novel ends with Mikami asking Futawatari to let him stay in Media Relations in the spring rather than moving him to Criminal Investigations.

== Development ==
The original novel was composed over a period of ten years. Hideo Yokoyama was inspired by his own 12 years of experience as a former police reporter in Gunma, and then as an editor. He suffered a heart attack during the writing process but continued the novel anyway.

Jonathan Lloyd-Davies said in an interview that it took him over a year to translate the novel into the English version. He worked independently of author Hideo Yokoyama and conducted research by reading Japanese police websites and online records. The length of the novel and the extensive number of characters posed as a challenge during the translation process.

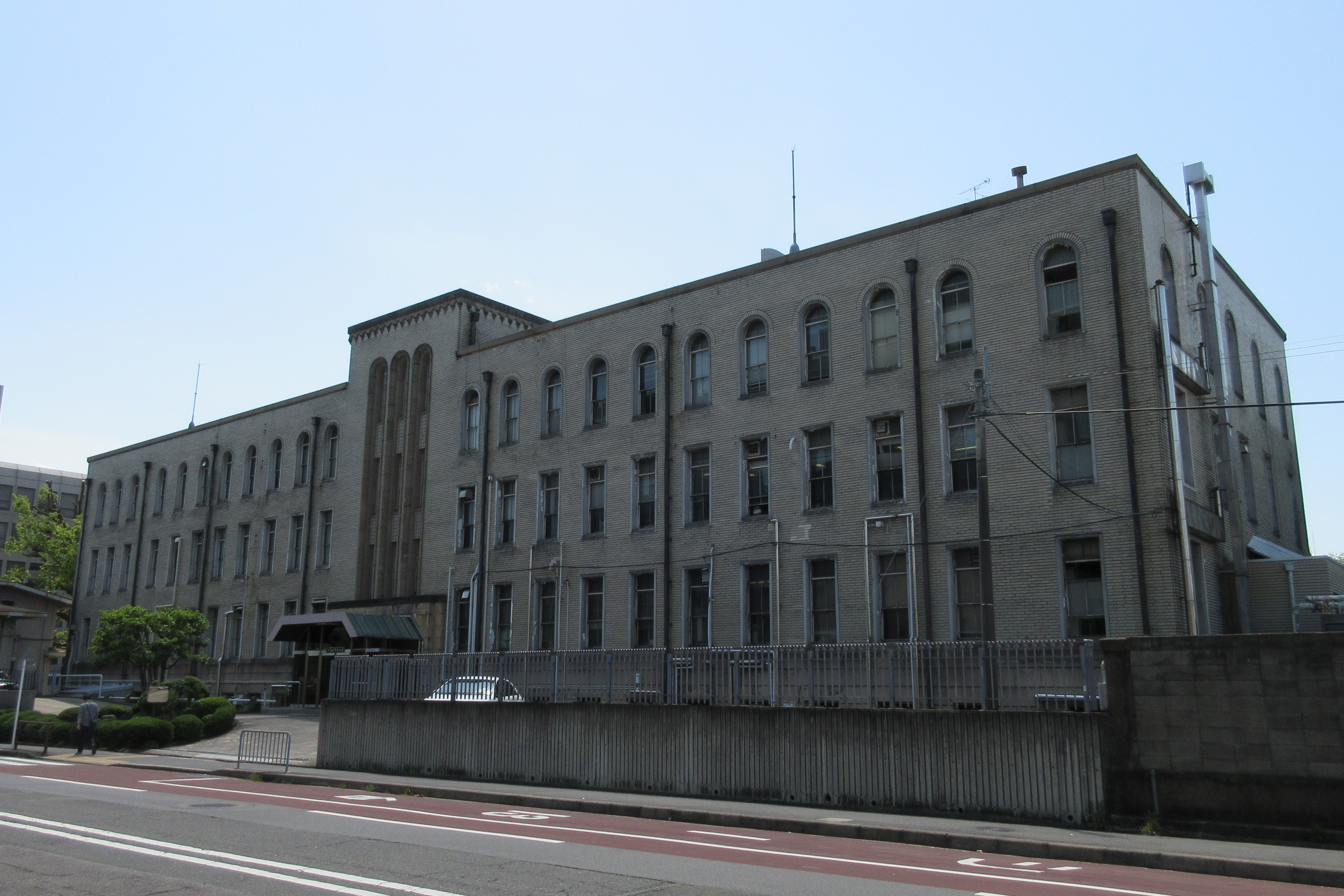
Police Headquarters in Kyoto; example of what the main setting of the novel, Prefecture D Headquarters, could resemble

== Major characters ==
Police

- Kozuka – Commissioner General of the National Police Agency in Tokyo, the man in charge of all 260,000 police officers
- Kinji Tsujiuchi – Captain of the Prefectural HQ, the man in charge of the prefecture and the favorite to become the next commissioner general
- Ishii – Secretariat Chief
- Akama – Director of Administrative Affairs and the second-in-command of the Prefectural HQ
- Shirota – Division Chief of Administrative Affairs
- Shinji Futawatari – Inspector for Administrative Affairs, incites certain events of the plot
- Yoshinobu Mikami – Press Director and inspector of Prefecture D, previously assistant chief of Second Division in Criminal Investigations, main character/protagonist of novel
- Suwa – Section chief and assistant inspector in Media Relations, 5 years in Media relations
- Kuramae – Sub-chief in Media Relations
- Mikumo – Recent transfer to Media Relations from Transport
- Arakida – Director of Criminal Investigations
- Katsutoshi Matsuoka – Chief of First Division, possibly next Director of Criminal Investigations
- Mikura – Assistant Chief of First Division
- Ochihai – Chief of Second Division
- Itokawa – Assistant Chief of Second Division

Civilians

- Minako – Wife of Mikami, ex-police, stays at home to await a call from Ayumi
- Ayumi – Daughter of Mikami and Minako who had run away from home and has been missing for three months
- Koda – Ex-police detective involved in the Six Four case cover-up referred to as the "Koda Memo"
- Akikawa – Chief reporter of the Toyo, leader of the Press Club and instigator of press conflicts
- Yoshio Amamiya – Father of the victim (Shoko Amamiya) of the Six Four kidnapping case.

== Content and style ==
Multiple reviews from outside Japan have commented on the culturally-dense nature of Six Four. The novel reveals many different aspects of Japanese culture, such as authority, hierarchy, and family structures. The novel has been praised for its accurate portrayal of Japanese conventions, with The Guardian calling it a "guide book to Japan". Additionally, the book has received acknowledgement as a culturally expressive book that delves into the politics of the police and their procedural practices. Cultural practices such as bowing and attending the funeral of a case victim's family member are found throughout the novel and allow foreign audiences to glimpse Japanese culture.

Reviewers have recognized Six Four for its focus on relationship dynamics over the fast-paced action that typically defines crime novels. The Japan Times applauded Yokoyama for his accurate portrayal of police procedurals, attributing the book's success to the slow, timely resolution of the plot. Six Four is often referred to as a "slow-burn" crime novel that draws readers into the personal, complex interactions between characters.

== Reception ==
The novel was an instant hit and sold roughly a million copies within the first week of its 2012 publication in Japan. In 2013, Six Four ranked number 1 in the Kono Mystery ga Sugoi! annual list, receiving the title The Best Japanese Crime Fiction of the Year. The novel was made into a two part movie series in 2016 in Japan. The first movie deals with the first half of the novel, and the second movie covers the announcement of the new kidnapping to the novel's conclusion.

Upon its 2017 publication in the UK, the translated novel proved as popular as it had been in Japan, quickly ranking on the best seller's list in Britain. In 2016, it was shortlisted for the CWA International Dagger. In 2017, it appeared on the New York Times' 100 Notable Books of the Year list and was called one of the best books of the year by The Washington Post, San Francisco Chronicle, and Literary Hub. The novel's unique style has proven popular with Western audiences, with publications such as Financial Times praising its "slow-burning" nature.

The book was adapted into a British television series by ITVX with scriptwriter Gregory Burke moving the setting from Japan to Scotland.

== See also ==
Other works by Yokoyama:

- Prefecture D
- Seventeen
