= Prefecture D =

1998 novella collection

Prefecture D (陰の季節, Kage no Kisetsu, "Season of Shadows") is a 1998 novella collection by Hideo Yokoyama, published by Bungeishunju. The English translation, by Jonathan Lloyd-Davies, was published by the MCD imprint of Farrar, Straus and Giroux in 2020.

There are four novellas in the collection:

- "Season of Shadows" (陰の季節)
- "Cry of the Earth" (地の声)
- "Black Lines" (黒い線)
- "Briefcase" (鞄)

The novellas take place in "Prefecture D", which itself is not specified. Paul Sedan of The Christian Science Monitor argued that it would likely be "one in a mountainous location in the middle of the country." They focus more on day-to-day business of the police agency of that fictional prefecture, including personal conflicts. Kirkus Reviews stated that "politics" rather than "mayhem" is the focus.

== Background ==
The translator originated from Wales.

== Reception ==
Sedan argued that the work has "attention-grabbing prose" and that the translator did "a yeoman’s job here."

Publishers Weekly stated that the book is "disappointing", arguing that the resolutions "are largely anticlimactic" and that the characters are not "memorable".

== See also ==
Other works by Yokoyama:

- Seventeen
- Six Four
