= The Cat Who Saved Books =

2017 novel by Sosuke Natsukawa

The Cat Who Saved Books (本を守ろうとする猫の話) is a 2017 novel by Sosuke Natsukawa, published by Shogakukan. Its English translation, done by Louise Heal Kawai, was published in 2021 by HarperVia.

It was the first novel by Natsukawa that was translated into English.

== Background ==
In addition to being an author, Natsukawa is also a doctor.

== Plot ==
The book is about a teenage boy, Rintaro Natsuki (夏木 林太郎, Natsuki Rintarō), who stops attending high school classes after he obtains a bookshop held by his deceased grandfather. A talking cat character, named Tiger, appears and helps Rintaro deal with his trauma.

Louise George Kittaka of The Japan Times wrote that Rintaro has "hikikomori (reclusive) tendencies".

== Reception ==
Lanie Tankard, who reviewed the book for World Literature Today, compared the book with The Jungle by Upton Sinclair because the book has commentary on the publishing industry.

Kirkus Reviews gave the book a positive review, comparing it to catnip.

Publishers Weekly argued that the work was too "simplistic" to be substantial; the reviewer argued the book was "hopeful and breezy".

Hephzibah Anderson of The Observer wrote that the work is "whimsical".

== See also ==
Other books translated by Louise Kawai:

- Ms Ice Sandwich
- Seventeen
