= Yuta Kanai =

Japanese actor (born 1985)

- 金井 勇太
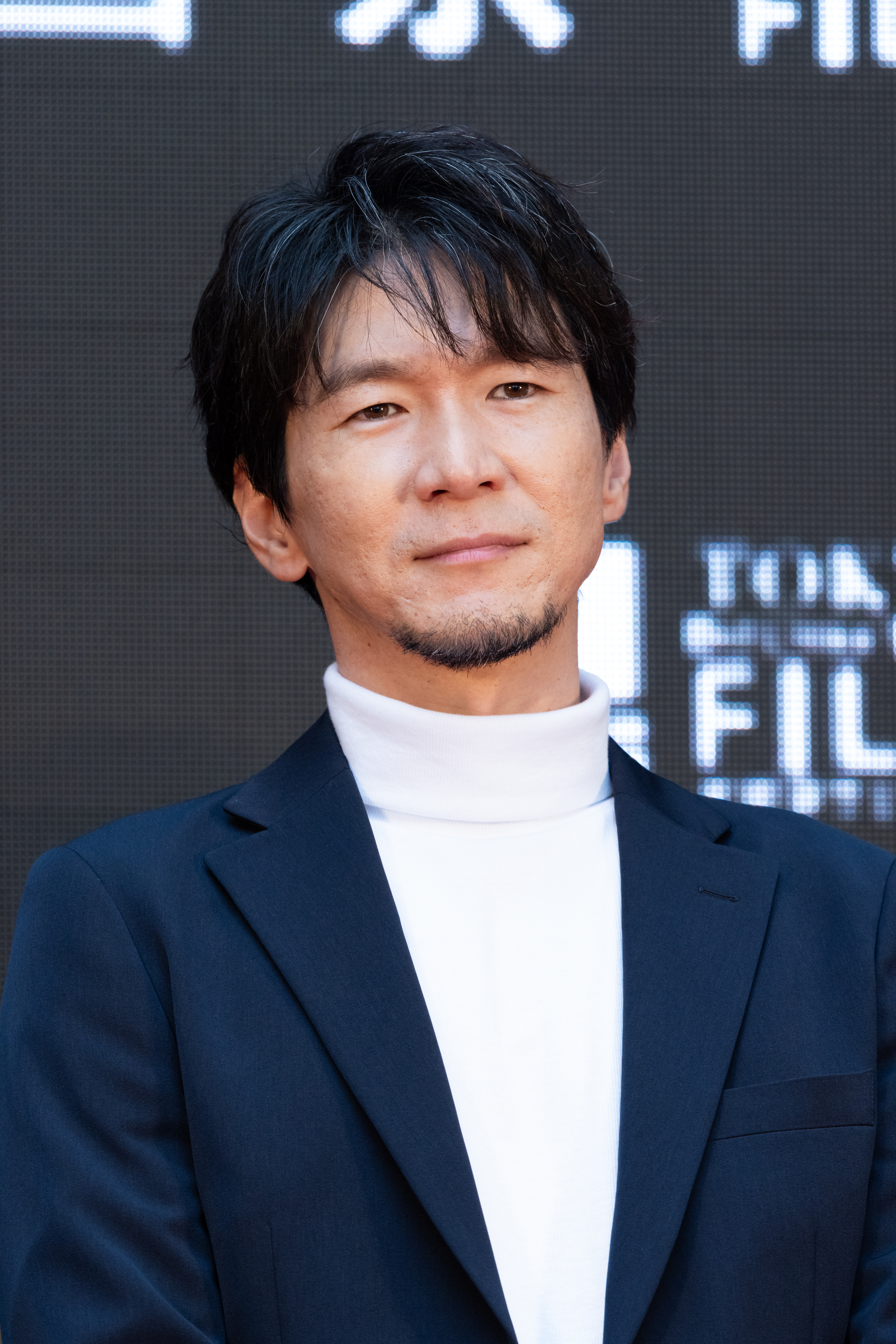
- Kanai at the 37th Tokyo International Film Festival in 2024
- Born: April 24, 1985 (age 41); Fussa, Tokyo, Japan
- Occupation: Actor
- Years active: 1998–present
- Agent: Theatre de Poche
- Spouse: Unknown (m. 2012)
- Children: 2

Yuta Kanai (金井 勇太, Kanai Yūta; born April 24, 1985) is a Japanese actor.

== Personal life ==
Kanai was born and raised in Fussa, Tokyo, Japan.

In late 2012, Kanai announced on his blog that he had registered his marriage to his non-celebrity partner. He has two children, a son born on June 17, 2013, and another child born on June 1, 2018.

== Filmography ==
=== Film ===
- A Class to Remember IV (2000), Daisuke Kawashima
- L: Change the WorLd (2008)
- Confessions (2010)
- From Me to You (2010)
- 64: Part I (2016)
- 64: Part II (2016)
- Fragments of the Last Will (2022)
- Baian the Assassin, M.D. 2 (2023)
- My Beautiful Man: Eternal (2023)
- Kaze yo Arashi yo (2024), Kyūtarō Wada
- Last Mile (2024), Takashi Itomaki
- Or Utopia (2025)
- Climbing for Life (2025)

=== Television ===
- Gō (2011), Oda Nobutaka
- MIU404 (2020), Takashi Itomaki
- Reach Beyond the Blue Sky (2021), Sanjō Sanetomi
- Kaze yo Arashi yo (2022), Kyūtarō Wada
- Galápagos (2023)
- My Beautiful Man: Season 2 (2023)
- The Scent of the Wind (2026), Kosaku Sakata
