= 64: Part II =

2016 film directed by Takahisa Zeze

- Poster

Japanese name
- Kanji: 64 ロクヨン 後編
- Directed by: Takahisa Zeze
- Based on: Six Four by Hideo Yokoyama
- Starring: Kōichi Satō; Gō Ayano; Nana Eikura; Yui Natsukawa; Naoto Ogata; Masataka Kubota; Kentaro Sakaguchi; Kippei Shiina; Kenichi Takitō; Eiji Okuda; Tōru Nakamura; Hidetaka Yoshioka; Eita; Masatoshi Nagase; Tomokazu Miura
- Cinematography: Koichi Saito
- Production companies: Tokyo Broadcasting System; Toho; Dentsu; Chubu-Nippon Broadcasting; WOWOW; Asahi Shimbun; Mainichi Shimbun; TBS Radio; Mainichi Broadcasting System; RKB Mainichi Broadcasting; KDDI Corporation; Cobra Pictures; Hokkaido Broadcasting; Tohoku Broadcasting Company; Broadcasting System of Niigata; Shizuoka Broadcasting System; Sanyo Broadcasting; Chugoku Broadcasting; GyaO; TC Entertainment; Nippon Shuppan Hanbai
- Distributed by: Toho
- Release date: June 11, 2016
- Running time: 119 minutes
- Country: Japan
- Language: Japanese
- Box office: US$15.6 million

64: Part II is a 2016 Japanese suspense mystery drama film directed by Takahisa Zeze, based on the novel of the same name by Hideo Yokoyama. The film follows 64: Part I, released on May 7, 2016. It was released in Japan by Toho on June 11, 2016.

== Cast ==
- Kōichi Satō
- Gō Ayano
- Nana Eikura
- Yui Natsukawa
- Naoto Ogawa
- Masataka Kubota
- Yuta Kanai
- Michitaka Tsutsui
- Mayu Tsuruta
- Hidekazu Akai
- Shun Sugata
- Yukiyoshi Ozawa
- Daikichi Sugawara
- Tasuku Emoto
- Kentaro Sakaguchi

== Reception ==
The film was number-one at the Japanese box office on its opening, with 282,693 admissions and grossing ¥354.1 million. As of July 10, 2016, the film has grossed US$15.6 million in Japan.
