= Hideo Yokoyama =

Japanese novelist (born 1957)

- 横山秀夫
- Born: January 17, 1957 (age 69); Tokyo, Japan
- Occupation: Writer
- Writing career
- Language: Japanese
- Genres: Crime fiction, mystery fiction, thriller
- Notable work: Six Four
- Notable awards: Matsumoto Seicho Prize (1998); Mystery Writers of Japan Award (2000); The Best Japanese Crime Fiction of the Year (2003, 2013)

Hideo Yokoyama (横山 秀夫, Yokoyama Hideo; born 1957) is a Japanese novelist who specializes in mystery novels. He is also known for his career as a journalist for the Jomo Shimbun, the regional paper in Gunma. He repeated his Kono Mystery ga Sugoi! No. 1 ranking in 2013 with Six Four (64). The English edition of Six Four, translated by Jonathan Lloyd-Davies, was shortlisted for the 2016 CWA International Dagger.

== Works in English translation ==
=== Novels ===
- Six Four (original title: 64 Rokuyon), trans. Jonathan Lloyd-Davies (riverrun, 2016)
- Seventeen (original title: Kuraimāzu hai [Climber's High]), trans. Louise Heal Kawai (riverrun, 2018)
- Prefecture D (original title: Kage no Kisetsu), trans. Jonathan Lloyd-Davies (riverrun, 2019)
- The North Light (original title: Nōsu Raito), trans. Louise Heal Kawai (riverrun, 2023)

=== Short story ===
- Motive (original title: Dōki), trans. Beth Cary (Ellery Queen's Mystery Magazine, May 2008)

=== Essay ===
- My Favourite Mystery, "Paradise lost in the box" by Kenji Takemoto (Mystery Writers of Japan, Inc. )

== Awards and nominations ==
Japanese Awards

- 1998 – Matsumoto Seicho Prize: "Kage no Kisetsu" (Season of Shadows)
- 2000 – Mystery Writers of Japan Award for Best Short Story: "Motive"
- 2003 – The Best Japanese Crime Fiction of the Year (Kono Mystery ga Sugoi! 2003): Han'ochi (Half a Confession)
- 2005 – Nominee for Honkaku Mystery Award for Best Fiction: Rinjō (Initial Response)
- 2013 – The Best Japanese Crime Fiction of the Year (Kono Mystery ga Sugoi! 2013): Six Four

UK Award

- 2016 – Shortlisted for the CWA International Dagger: Six Four

== Bibliography ==
=== Novels ===
- Deguchi no Nai Umi (出口のない海), 1996
- Kage no Kisetsu (陰の季節), 1998
  - English translation: Prefecture D, riverrun, 2019
- Han'ochi (半落ち), 2002
- Kuraimāzu hai (Climber's High) (クライマーズ・ハイ), 2003
  - English translation: Seventeen, riverrun, 2018
- Rupan no Shōsoku (ルパンの消息), 2005
- Shindo Zero (震度0), 2005
- Rokuyon (64), 2012
  - English translation: Six Four, riverrun, 2016
- Nōsu Raito (North Light) (ノースライト), 2019
  - English translation: North Light, riverrun, 2024

=== Short story collections ===
- Dōki (動機), 2000
- Kao (顔), 2002
- Fukaoi (深追い), 2002
- Shinsō (真相), 2003
- Kagefumi (影踏み), 2003
- Kanshugan (看守眼), 2004
- Rinjō (臨場), 2004
- Rinjō Special Book (臨場スペシャルブック), 2010

== Film adaptations ==
- Half a Confession (2004) (Han'ochi)
- Deguchi no Nai Umi (2006)
- Climber's High (2008) (Kuraimāzu hai)
- Rinjō (2012)
- Rokuyon (64) Part I (2016)
- Rokuyon (64) Part II (2016)
- Kagefumi (2019)
