= Hideki Togi =

Japanese composer, musician, and actor (born 1959)

Hideki Togi 東儀 秀樹
- Born: 12 October 1959 (age 66); Tokyo, Japan
- Genre: Modern Gagaku
- Occupations: Gagaku musician; composer
- Instruments: Hichiriki; biwa; taiko; cello; piano; synthesizer
- Years active: 1996–
- Labels: Toshiba-EMI (1996–2004); Universal Classics (2007– )
- Formerly of: Togi+Bao
- Website: togihideki.net

Hideki Togi (東儀 秀樹, Tōgi Hideki; born 12 October 1959, in Tokyo) is a Japanese composer, gagaku musician, and actor. His current label is Universal Music (transferred from Toshiba-EMI in 2007). Tōgi joined the Imperial Music Division in 1986 but had to quit in 2000 because of the hostile reaction to his popular compositions from fellow gagaku musicians.

== Bibliography ==
Year	Title	Publisher	Notes
2000	Gagaku: Boku no Kōkishin	Shueisha Shinsho	
2000	Hideki Togi Shashin-shū	Shueisha	Photographed by Koichi Inakoshi; appeared with thick make-up of white finish as much as stage make-up
2002	Hideki Togi no Mōhitotsu no Tabi: Nanfutsu no Hikari to Kaze	Bungeishunjū	Photographed by Seiya Adachi
2003	Hideki Togi no Eien no Omocha-bako	PHP Institute	
2007	Subete o Hitei shinai Ikikata	KK Longsellers	
2015	Togi Ie no Kosodate	Kodansha	

=== Co-authored ===
Year	Title	Publisher	Co-author	Notes
2002	Hikari Furu Oto	Kodansha	Yuko Kanno	Illustrated by Togi
2003	Amatsukaze no Oto	Kodansha	Yuko Kanno	Sequel from Hikari Furu Oto; illustrated by Togi
2004	Hoshizukiyo no oto	Kodansha	Yuko Kanno	Completion of the above-mentioned Kanno's work 3 copies; illustrated by Togi

== Discography ==
=== CD albums ===
Title	Notes
Hideki Togi	
Mode Of Rising Sun	
Gensō Fu	
Togism	
from Asia	
Gagaku: Ten-chi-sora–Chitose no Yū Miyabi	
Togism 2	
Togism 2001	
I am with you	
Pictures	
Kaze to Hikari no Kiseki–Best Of Togism	
Haruiro Saika	As part of Togi+Bao
Super Asia	As part of Togi+Bao
Out Of Border	
Every little life	
Chikyū yo,	
Smile	
Kodomo-tachi ni Yasashī Mirai o	
Togi	
NHK Special "Uchū–Michi e no Dai Kikō"	

=== CD singles ===
Title
Aoki Umi no Michi
There must be an angel
Umi no Mukō no Sagashi mo no–Kamai-tachi no Yoru 2
Hikari Furu Oto

=== Representative songs ===
Song	Tie-up	Notes
New Asia	NHK Shin Asia Hakken theme song	
Hikari Furu Oto	Picture book Hikari Furu Oto image song	
Hoshizora ni tsutsuma rete	NHK Special Uchū: Michi e no Dai Kikō theme song	
Aoki Umi no Michi	Tokyo Broadcasting System Tōshō Daiji 2010 Project theme song	
There must be an angel	Lipton "Lipton the Tea" advert song	Eurythmics cover

=== Unpublished songs ===
Song	Tie-up	Composition	Arrangement	Performance
Ima aru koto e no Serenade	Fuji Television Goro Inagaki no Ongaku Kyōjidai original song	Hideki Togi	Michiru Ōshima	Hideki Togi & New Japan Philharmonic

=== Music in charge ===
Title	Notes
Film The Blue Light	Directed by Yukio Ninagawa; starring Kazunari Ninomiya
Stage Oedipus-ō	In charge of dancing choreographed, appeared as a dancer; won the Yomiuri Theater Award Excellence Staff Award
PlayStation for software Yamagata Digital Museum	Pictures: Hiro Yamagata
PlayStation 2 for software Kamai-tachi no Yoru 2: Kangoku Shima no Warabe Uta	Part of the new music is in charge
NHK TV drama Mofuku no Rendezvous	Starring Naohito Fujiki

== Filmography ==
=== Documentaries ===
Date	Title	Network	Notes
1999	Inochi no Hibiki	TBS	
2009	Watashi ga Kodomo dattakoro	NHK	
19 Mar 2011	BS Japan 10 Shūnenkinen Bangumi: Harukanaru Unkei no Gokusai Kūkan	BS Japan	Navigator

=== Language programmes ===
Run	Title	Network
Oct 2016 –	Tabi suru Italia-go Hideki Togi no Otona no Kodawari Tabi: Rome to Bishoku no Hōko Emilia Chihō o Iku	NHK E

=== Dramas ===
Year	Title	Role	Network	Notes
2001	Rouge	Tomoyuki Akiba	NHK	
2008	Taiga drama Atsuhime	Emperor Kōmei		
2009	Mr. Brain	Hitoshi Yagi	TBS	
2009	Mitsuhiko Asami: Sai Shūshō	Gentleman	TBS	Episode 8 "Yomigaeru Akai Kutsu no Densetsu... Yokohama-hen"
2011	Yoru Dora Bitter Sugar	Shinji Naito	NHK	
2023	Ultraman Blazar	Hoichi Tsukushi	TV Tokyo	Episode 9 "Planet of Music"

=== Films ===
Year	Title	Role	Distributor
1998	DJ Kid Heavenz	DJ Ryosuke	
2011	Genji Monogatari: Sennen no Nazo	Emperor Ichijō	Toho

=== Advertisements ===
Year	Brand	Product	Advert	Notes
2001	Lipton	Lipton the Tea		Co-starred with Ikuko Kawai
2007	Lotte	Green Gum		
2008	McDonald's	Premium Roast Coffee, Premium Roast Ice Coffee		Co-starred with Takeshi Itoh
2008	McDonald's	McBakery		
2008	Kizakura	Junmai Karakuchi Ikkon		
2010	Daiwa Securities		Daiwa Securities Group	
