= 64: Part I =

2016 film directed by Amr Arafa

- Poster

Japanese name
- Kanji: 64 ロクヨン 前編
- Directed by: Takahisa Zeze
- Based on: Six Four by Hideo Yokoyama
- Starring: Kōichi Satō; Gō Ayano; Nana Eikura; Yui Natsukawa; Naoto Ogata; Masataka Kubota; Kentaro Sakaguchi; Kippei Shiina; Kenichi Takitō; Eiji Okuda; Tōru Nakamura; Hidetaka Yoshioka; Eita; Masatoshi Nagase; Tomokazu Miura
- Cinematography: Koichi Saito
- Production companies: Tokyo Broadcasting System; Toho; Dentsu; Chubu-Nippon Broadcasting; WOWOW; Asahi Shimbun; Mainichi Shimbun; TBS Radio; Mainichi Broadcasting System; RKB Mainichi Broadcasting; KDDI Corporation; Cobra Pictures; Hokkaido Broadcasting; Tohoku Broadcasting Company; Broadcasting System of Niigata; Shizuoka Broadcasting System; Sanyo Broadcasting; Chugoku Broadcasting; GyaO; TC Entertainment; Nippon Shuppan Hanbai
- Distributed by: Toho
- Release date: May 7, 2016
- Running time: 121 minutes
- Country: Japan
- Language: Japanese
- Box office: US$17.8 million

64: Part I is a 2016 Japanese suspense mystery drama film directed by Takahisa Zeze, based on the novel of the same name by Hideo Yokoyama. It was released in Japan by Toho on May 7, 2016. The second part, 64: Part II, was released on June 11, 2016.

== Plot ==
1989 is the 64th year of the Shōwa era in the Japanese calendar, thus the unsolved girl kidnapping-murder case is called "64(rokuyon)", as it originated in this year in the Criminal Investigation Department in the Prefectural Police Department. Unsolved for 14 years, it becomes the police’s greatest embarrassment, and it is approaching the statute of limitations. In 2002, Yoshinobu Mikami, an ex-detective who was assigned as the investigator of the "Rokuyon" case 14 years ago, is moved to Public Relations Officer in the Police Affairs Department against his will. As a newly assigned Public Relations Officer, he struggles with reporters, as a new case has occurred, which mirrors the "Rokuyon" case exactly.

== Reception ==
The film was third placed at the Japanese box office on its opening, with 203,703 admissions and grossing ¥257.3 million. On its second weekend, it was fifth placed. As of June 26, 2016, the film has grossed US$17.8 million in Japan.
