= Marcy =

Marcy or Marcie may refer to:

== People ==
=== Surname ===
- Alfred Marcy (1900–1977), U.S. Army colonel
- Elizabeth Eunice Marcy (1821–1911), American author, activist, and social reformer; wife of Oliver Marcy
- Florent Marcie, French documentary filmmaker, war reporter and journalist
- Geoffrey Marcy (born 1954), American astronomer
- Henry O. Marcy (1837–1924), American physician
- John S. Marcy (1830–1885), American farmer and politician
- Oliver Marcy (1820–1899), professor and administrator at Northwestern University; husband of Elizabeth Eunice Marcy
- Pat Marcy (1913–1993), American mobster and politician
- Randolph B. Marcy (1812–1887), U.S. Army officer and explorer
- William L. Marcy (1786–1857), American lawyer, politician and judge, 11th Governor of New York
- The Marcy Brothers, American country music trio Kevin, Kris and Kendal Marcy

=== Given name ===
- Marcie Blane (born 1944), American singer
- Marcie Bolen (born 1977), American guitarist, a founding member of The Von Bondies
- Marcy Conrad (1967–1981), American murder victim
- Marcie Dodd (born 1978), American stage actress and singer
- Marcie Free (born 1954), American rock singer
- Marcy Harriell (fl. 1994–present), American actress, singer and writer
- Marcy Kaptur (born 1946), American politician
- Marcy Hinzmann (born 1982), American figure skater
- Arrest of Marcy Rheintgen
- Marcy Teodoro (born 1970), Filipino politician and current mayor of Marikina
- Marcy Toepel (born 1958), 21st century American politician
- Marcy Towns, American chemist
- Marcy Walker (born 1961), American actress
- Marcy Marxer (born 1956), American Roots Musician, actor, GRAMMY Winner

=== Other ===
- Sam Marcy, pen name of American Marxist and co-founder of Workers World Party Sam Ballan (1911–1998)
- Masashi Tashiro (born 1956), former Japanese TV performer's nickname

== Fictional characters ==
- Marcy (American Horror Story), in the 2011 television anthology series American Horror Story
- Marcy (Chrono Cross), from the video game Chrono Cross
- Marcie, in the Peanuts comic strip
- Marcy Burns, in the television series Man with a Plan (2016–2020)
- Marcy D'Arcy, in the television series Married... with Children (1987–1997)
- Marcie McBain, in the soap opera One Life to Live (1968–2013)
- Marcy Wu, in the animated fantasy series Amphibia (2019–2022)
- Marceline the Vampire Queen, a character in the animated series Adventure Time (2010–2018)

== Places ==
=== United States ===
- Mount Marcy (New York), the highest mountain in New York
- Marcy Hill, New York
- Marcy, New York, a town
- Marcy Houses, a housing project in Brooklyn
- Marcy Correctional Facility, a prison in Marcy, New York
- Marcy Avenue (BMT Jamaica Line), a station on the New York City Subway J/Z lines
- Marcy Park (disambiguation), several parks
- Marcy Field, a public-use airport south of Keene, New York
- Marcy Brook, New York - see Marcy Dam

=== France ===
- Marcy, Aisne, a commune
- Marcy, Nièvre, a commune
- Marcy, Rhône, a commune

== Other ==
- Marcy potato, a variety of hybrid potato developed in 1990
- "Marcie", a track on Song to a Seagull, Joni Mitchell's debut album

== See also ==
- Marcia (given name)
- Marcy-l'Étoile, Rhône
- Marcy-sous-Marle, Aisne
- Fort Marcy (disambiguation)
- Marsi (disambiguation)
