= Marsus =

Marsus is a Roman family name, and the Latinisation of the surnames Marso and Marsi.

Marsus may refer to:

== People ==
- Domitius Marsus, Latin poet of ancient Rome; friend of Virgil and Tibullus
- Gaius Vibius Marsus, proconsul of the Roman Empire during the first century
- Marsus (king), Latin name of mythical Germanic king Mers, aka Marso
- Paulus Marsus (1440–1484), Renaissance humanist and poet known primarily for his commentary on the Fasti of Ovid
- Petrus Marsus (1442–1512), aka Peter Marso, Renaissance scholar who wrote a commentary on Silius Italicus' epic poem Punica
- Johannes Harmonius Marsus (c. 1477–c. 1553), Renaissance humanist and poet known for his plays

== Other uses ==
- Marsus municipium, the Latin alias of San Benedetto dei Marsi, a comune and town in the province of L'Aquila in the Abruzzo region of Italy
- Spectamen marsus, a Pacific sea snail species with a streaked top shell

== See also ==
- Marsi (disambiguation)
