= Excusatio Lazari =

Disclaimer

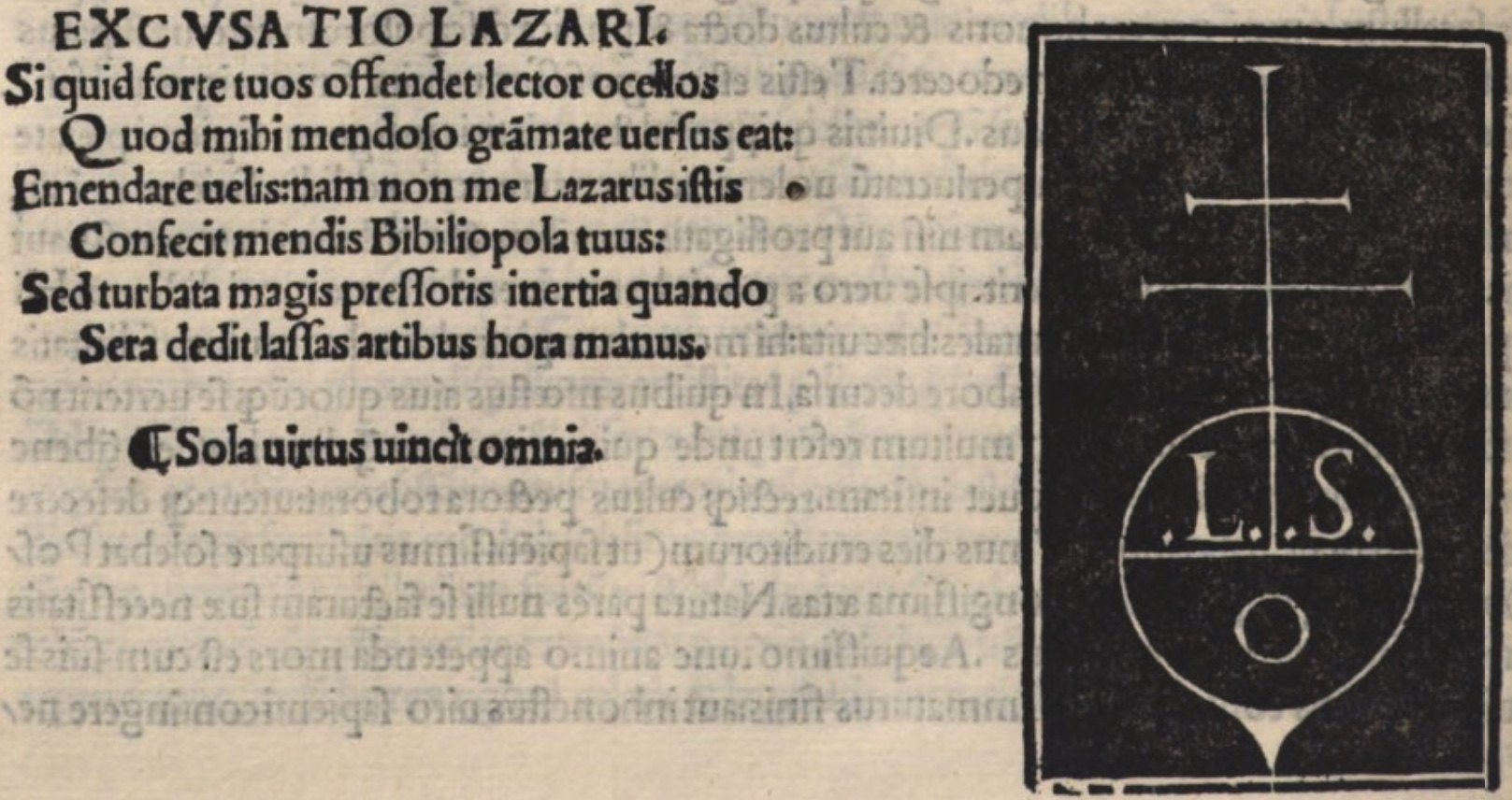
Excusatio Lazari (Note: "If by chance anything should offend your eyes, reader, because of how a line of mine might read, with a faulty character or two, you may wish to emend; for Lazzaro your bookseller did not put the final touches to me with those blemishes, more it is a matter of the befuddled artlessness of the printer when, at a late hour, he turned his weary hands to his arts." [Followed by:] "Virtue alone overcomes all.") in Pietro Marso's commentary on Cicero's De Natura Deorum and De Divinatione, published in Venice in 1508 by Lazzaro de' Soardi

An excusatio Lazari or "Lazzaro's disclaimer" is a message to the reader found occasionally in publications, whereby the editor, publisher, or bibliopole transfers the blame for any errors to the anonymous printer while forging a connection with his readership. Included for the first time in his 1497 edition of Terence by Lazzaro de' Soardi, the message may be found in books by other publishers and into the twenty-first century.

== See also ==
- Cancel leaf
- Erratum
- Lazarus
