= Airi Furuta =

Japanese actress

- Born: June 30, 2002 (age 24); Gifu City, Gifu Prefecture, Japan
- Occupation: Actress
- Years active: 2015–present
- Agent: Avex Management Agency
- Height: 162 cm (5 ft 4 in)
- Children: 1

Airi Furuta (古田 愛理, Furuta Airi; born June 30, 2002) is a Japanese gravure idol, fashion model, actress, and former idol, as well as a former exclusive model for the fashion magazine Popteen. She is from Gifu, Gifu Prefecture, and is affiliated with Avex Management Agency.

== Career ==
In 2015, the entertainment division of a corporate group in Gifu Prefecture formed the female idol duo "jamini." Furuta was selected as a member due to her extensive dance experience and engaged in idol activities centered in Gifu Prefecture.

In 2017, she was chosen as a member of "flapbeats," a dance and vocal unit composed of trainees under contract with Avex, and performed at various "Avex Challenge Stage" events. On August 2, she won the Popteen Award and the ar Award at the "TOKYO GIRLS AUDITION 2017," held during the "Tokyo Girls Collection 2017 AUTUMN/WINTER" at Saitama Super Arena. On December 1, she was selected to become an exclusive model for the magazine Popteen (published by Kadokawa Haruki Corporation), starting with the January 2018 issue.

In June 2018, she was selected—as the youngest member—for "Sei-Kore 18" (Uniform Collection '18), a project featured in Weekly Young Jump (Shueisha). However, regarding assignments given by the Popteen editorial department, she was notified in December that she was being demoted from exclusive model to regular model because her posing and social media engagement were deemed insufficient after a month. At that time, she was encouraged to participate in the AbemaTV reality show "Popteen Cover Girl War" for a chance to regain her status as an exclusive model.

On January 13, 2019, she appeared on the AbemaTV program Shirayuki to Ookami-kun ni wa Damasarenai. She joined "Popteen Cover Girl War" during its final stages; during a mission where groups had to go out into the streets and collect 100 photos with fans who recognized them. Furuta, handicapped by her late entry, was moved to tears by her lack of name recognition. Subsequently, she won first place in the show's final episode and successfully regained her position as an exclusive model. On September 1, she launched her own YouTube channel, surpassing 30,000 subscribers within three days.

On February 20, 2020, she made her acting debut playing the role of Yuna Ogami in the AbemaTV original drama Boku Dake ga 17-sai no Sekai de. On September 9, she appeared as Sonoe Jujo in the MBS series Araburu Kisetsu no Otome-domo yo. On December 28, she was selected to appear on the cover of the February issue of Popteen alongside Riko and Kanon.

On February 1, 2021, she secured her first solo feature in the March issue of Popteen. On March 1, she was once again selected for the cover of the April issue of Popteen alongside Riko and Kanon.

On July 3, 2022, it was announced via the August issue of Popteen and her Instagram that she would be graduating from the magazine; the Popteen "Manatsu no Riako-sai" event held at Toyosu PIT on July 26 marked her final event appearance. (Note: She missed the event after testing positive for coronavirus on July 21, just before it was held; instead, a video message of her reading a letter from home was screened at the venue.。) She officially graduated with the release of the September issue of Popteen on August 1. On December 5, she won the YouTube Award at the "Gra-Japa! Awards 2022," which honors Shueisha's digital content. She reportedly saw an increase in comments from overseas viewers on her own YouTube channel after behind-the-scenes footage was uploaded to the Weekly Playboy YouTube channel.

On January 18, 2023, it was announced that her first photobook, titled Taikan Ondo (Perceived Temperature), would be released on March 31.

== Filmography ==
=== Television ===
Year	Title	Role	Other notes	Ref.
2020	O Maidens in Your Savage Season	Sonoe Jujo		
2024	Subarashiki Kana, Kokosei!	Hina Isoda		
2025	Stingers: Metropolitan Police Department Undercover Investigation Review Unit	Woman		
2025-2026	Dame-Mane! —Managing Hopeless Talents—	Moe Minami		
2025	My Oshi Is Now My Boss	Suzu Hayami		

=== Web series ===
Year	Title	Role	Other notes	Ref.
2020	Boku Dake ga 17-sai no Sekai de	Yuina Ogami	Episodes 4-8	
2022	And a One-Dimensional Love	Mami Akasaka		

=== TV program ===
Year	Title	Notes	Ref.
2021	The Toppa File	May 27th, 2021	

=== Web Shows ===
Year	Title	Notes	Ref.
2019	Shirayuki to Ookami-kun ni wa Damasarenai	January 13 - April 31st, 2019	
2019	Popteen Cover Girl War	January 18 - February 22, 2019	
2021	Ookami-kun wa mou Damasanai -Sanariru final balloon-	May 27th, 2021	

=== Music Video ===
- marcy - Wasurenagusa (2021)
- lol - sun kissed love (2021)
