= List of SSSS.Dynazenon episodes =

SSSS.Dynazenon
- No. of episodes: 12

Release
- Original network: Tokyo MX, BS11, MBS
- Original release: April 2 – June 18, 2021

Season chronology
- ← Previous; SSSS.Gridman

SSSS.Dynazenon is a 2021 anime television series produced by Studio Trigger. It features the same universe with SSSS.Gridman, as well as the same staff from the series, including director Amemiya, writer Hasegawa, character designer Sakamoto and composer Sagisu. The opening theme is "Imperfect" by Masayoshi Ōishi, while the ending theme is "Strobe Memory" by Maaya Uchida. The series aired from April 2 to June 18, 2021, on Tokyo MX, BS11, and MBS.

== Episode list ==
No.	Title	Directed by	Written by	Storyboarded by	Original release date
1	"What Is a Kaiju User?"; Transliteration: "Kaijū Tsukaitte, Nani?" (Japanese: 怪獣使いって、なに？)	Yoshiyuki Kaneko	Keiichi Hasegawa	Akira Amemiya	April 2, 2021
Yomogi Asanaka is a regular high school student who happens upon a mysterious young man named Gauma, who is disabled by hunger. Yomogi offers Gauma a sandwich, which earns Gauma's loyalty to him, as he reveals that he is a "Kaiju User". The next day, Yomogi is asked out on a date by Yume Minami, a strange girl from Yomogi's class who has a reputation for asking boys out on dates and then ditching them. Yomogi, skeptical of the rumors, accepts. Meanwhile, strange phenomena begins to occur around the city as random objects and buildings begin to float in the air. That night, Yomogi heads to the meeting point but Yume fails to arrive. Gauma spots Yume observing Yomogi from a distance and confronts her over breaking her promise to Yomogi, and Yume admits there is something wrong with her. Suddenly, a Kaiju appears in the middle the city. Unable to take control of the Kaiju, Gauma uses a special item to summon the robot Dynazenon. Requiring four pilots to crew it, Dynazenon absorbs Gauma, Yomogi, Yume, and a nearby NEET named Koyomi Yamanaka, as his cousin, Chise Asukagawa, watches helplessly. Gauma takes sole control of Dynazenon to battle the Kaiju, but when the Kaiju gains the upper hand, Gauma transforms Dynazenon into its "Dyna Rex" form, easily defeating the Kaiju.
2	"What's Your Reason for Fighting?"; Transliteration: "Tatakau Riyūtte, Nani?" (Japanese: 戦う理由って、なに？)	Akira Furukawa	Keiichi Hasegawa	Akira Amemiya	April 9, 2021
At the conclusion of the battle, Dynazenon shrinks down into a toy size. Gauma splits Dynazenon's components between himself, Yomogi, Yume, and Koyomi. Meanwhile, Chise finds a mysterious pebble on the ground and picks it up. Gauma tells the others that the Kaiju they just fought was being controlled by the "Kaiju Eugenicists", Kaiju Users like him, and that they will attack the city again, so they must train to better pilot Dynazenon. While Gauma, Yume, and Koyomi are serious about training, Yomogi instead focuses on his part-time job. Yume confronts Yomogi and combines her Dynazenon piece, "Dyna Wing", with Yomogi's "Dyna Soldier" to form the "Dyna Soldier Wing Combine". She then takes Yomogi to see the section of the city that was devastated by the Kaiju battle. On the way home, Yume mentions that her older sister died in an accident when she was young. The next day, four mysterious figures arrive in the city and take control of a Kaiju that recently appeared, causing havoc in the city again. Gauma, Yomogi, Yume, and Koyomi meet the Kaiju in battle with Dynazenon, but are forced to separate in order to match the Kaiju's faster speed. Having not trained, Yomogi finds it difficult to keep up with his partners until Yume links up with him to form Dyna Soldier Wing Combine again. Seeing a bus full of civilians caught in the battle, Yomogi gains the determination to fight, throwing the Kaiju into the air so Gauma can destroy it with a missile barrage. Afterwards, the four strangers confront Gauma, and he confirms that they are the Kaiju Eugenicists.
3	"What Is a Traitor?"; Transliteration: "Uragirimonotte, Nani?" (Japanese: 裏切り者って、なに？)	Yūichi Shimodaira	Keiichi Hasegawa	Ken Ōtsuka	April 16, 2021
The Kaiju Eugenicists reveal that they and Gauma used to be comrades, and ask him to rejoin their ranks, to which he refuses. Realizing they are at a disadvantage without a kaiju, the Kaiju Eugenicists retreat. The next day, Yomogi meets Yume at school, where she tells him how she and her older sister, Kano, were never particularly close, but Kano went out of her way to invite Yume to her music recital shortly before she died. Yume had been left wondering why Kano reached out to her then, and gets the contact information for one of Kano's classmates, Kanae. Meanwhile, Koyomi runs into Yomogi's part-time boss, Inamoto, who happens to be an old classmate of his, and Chise begins to feel jealous. One of the Kaiju Eugenicists, Juuga, personally meets with Yomogi, and explains Gauma used to be part of the Kaiju Eugenicists 5,000 years ago until he betrayed them, and now they have all been revived in the present day for unknown reasons. Yomogi, Yume, and Koyomi confront Gauma about his reasons for turning against the Kaiju Eugenicists, but he dodges the question. The next day, the Kaiju Eugenicists take control of a kaiju that appears in Chiba. The Dynazenon crew respond to the attack, but cannot get close due to the kaiju's ability to create explosions around itself. Gauma asks the others to combine to form Dynazenon, but they tell him it is impossible until he can earn their trust, so Gauma admits that he is looking for the woman who entrusted Dynazenon to him. Satisfied, the crew combines to form Dynazenon and carry the kaiju into space where its explosions have no effect and destroy it. The falling debris from the kaiju's corpse then lands on one of the Kaiju Eugenicists, apparently killing him. As Yume muses about the possibility of kaiju reviving people from the dead, the apparently dead Kaiju Eugenicist survives, surprised that he is still alive.
4	"What Is This Thumping Heart?"; Transliteration: "Kono Tokimekitte, Nani?" (Japanese: このときめきって、なに？)	Tatsumi Fujii	Keiichi Hasegawa	Tatsumi Fujii	April 23, 2021
Yomogi lately finds it difficult to focus on his tasks, and Inamoto surmises that he has a crush on Yume and encourages him to ask her out on a date. Yume meets with Kanae but does not learn much from her, but is pointed towards another classmate, Urita, who should have video recordings of Kano's performances. Later, one of the Kaiju Eugenicists, Sizumu, joins Yomogi and Yume's class under the guise of a transfer student, but appears friendly. He tells Yomogi and Yume that the Kaiju Eugenicists do not actually create the kaiju. Instead, the kaiju are born from a human's desire to be free from some burden, and the Kaiju Eugenicists take control of them in order to build a world where kaiju are needed. The next day, Yomogi is bedridden with a cold so Yume pays a visit to him. Meanwhile, the Kaiju Eugenicists take control a kaiju that can turn objects into 2D objects. With Yomogi down with a cold, Gauma, Yume, and Koyomi are forced to move out without him, with Yomogi loaning Dyna Soldier to Yume. Chise tries to pilot Dyna Soldier in Yomogi's stead, but proves to be too inexperienced to use it effectively. Yume is forced to pick up Yomogi so they can combine into Dynazenon and destroy the kaiju. On the way home, Yomogi asks Yume if he can accompany her to her visit with Urita, as he wants to know more about her. The next day, Yume is absent from class as she has caught Yomogi's cold.
5	"What's Lover-Like Mean?"; Transliteration: "Koibito Mitaitte, Nani?" (Japanese: 恋人みたいって、なに？)	Hideyuki Satake	Keiichi Hasegawa	Hiroyuki Ōshima	April 30, 2021
During another training session, Yomogi and Koyomi test combining Dyna Soldier and Dyna Striker together into Dyna Soldier Striker Combine, but find the combination too top heavy to use effectively. Yomogi and Yume then go meet Urita, who shows them a video of Kano, but does not know much more about her. Koyomi has lunch with Inamoto, as he wonders why she suddenly wants to spend time with him even though she is married. Meanwhile, Chise secures tickets to the Tokyo Beach Land water park. Yume invites Sizumu to join them, with Gauma figuring it is the perfect opportunity for them to capture him while he is separated from the other Kaiju Eugenicists. However, the group, with the exception of Gauma, spend the day having fun while Gauma's attempts are constantly thwarted. Sizumu then reveals to Yomogi and Yume that kaiju are attracted to certain emotions before the other Kaiju Eugenicists summon him to take control of a recently appeared kaiju. The Dynazenon crew assemble to fight it, and Yomogi and Koyomi manage to use Dyna Soldier Striker Combine's firepower to stun the kaiju long enough for them to combine into Dynazenon and defeat it. Yomogi and Yume then go meet the former vice president of the Chorus Club, who tells Yume that there was a rumor that Kano did not die in an accident, but committed suicide instead.
6	"What Is This Pain?"; Transliteration: "Kono Setsunasatte, Nani?" (Japanese: この切なさって、なに？)	Yoshiyuki Kaneko	Keiichi Hasegawa	Yoshiyuki Kaneko	May 7, 2021
In a meeting Yume is disturbed upon the rumors that Kano was being bullied by her classmates which could possibly have led to her committing suicide. However, the video evidence she views is not conclusive and Yomogi feels troubled when Yume starts shutting him out. The Kaiju Eugenicists have their own meeting, with Juuga and Onija advocating for killing Gauma and his friends, but Sizumu believes keeping them alive will benefit kaiju evolution, while Mujina remains undecided. Meanwhile, Koyomi has some drinks with Inamoto and is introduced to her husband, creating a feeling of resentment in him. After the meeting, a drunk Koyomi stumbles across Mujina, who takes the opportunity to steal the Dyna Striker from him. Once again, the Kaiju Eugenicists are split with Juuga wanting use it as bargaining chip, Onija wanting to destroy it, and Sizumu wanting to return it with no conditions. Once learning about what happened, Gauma, Koyomi, and Chise chase after the Kaiju Eugenicists and take Dyna Striker back. After escaping, the Kaiju Eugenicists locate another kaiju that is dominated by the combined efforts of Onija and Mujina. The Dynazenon crew confront the enemy kaiju, but Yomogi, Koyomi, and Yume are emotionally shaken by the latest events in their lives and lack the resolve to fight back. Just as Dynazenon is about to be defeated, Gridknight appears to protect it.
7	"What's Our Reason for Coming Together?"; Transliteration: "Atsumatta Imitte, Nani?" (Japanese: 集まった意味って、なに？)	Yoshihiro Miyajima	Keiichi Hasegawa	Yoshihiro Miyajima	May 14, 2021
Gridknight attacks the kaiju and quickly gains the upper hand, forcing Onija and Mujina to teleport it to safety and retreat. Gridknight then attacks Dynazenon, mistaking it for another kaiju, but quickly withdraws when his energy runs out. Koyomi sees Inamoto's husband caught in the wreckage and goes to rescue him, despite his resentment and jealousy towards him. Gauma, Yomogi, and Yume unsuccessfully search for the kaiju before deciding to stay watch all night to wait for it reappear. Chise and Koyomi eventually link up with the group when they're approached by Knight and The Second, part of the self-proclaimed Gridknight Alliance. They offer to help the Dynazenon crew fight the kaiju and repair the damage Dynazenon suffered in the previous battle, but Gauma refuses due to his mistrust. Later that night, Yume confides to Yomogi that she and Kano used to be close as children but grew more distant as they got older, and that she only saw Kano smile again just before her death. She still wants to find out what caused Kano's death, inspiring Yomogi to continue helping her. The next morning, the kaiju reappears. Gridknight also appears to team up with Dynazenon while The Second uses a Fixer Beam to repair Dynazenon's damage. Working together, Dynazenon and Gridknight destroy the kaiju. The Gridknight Alliance parts ways, and Koyomi finally comes to terms with his hang-ups over Inamoto, cutting ties with her. Yume asks Yomogi for his help in tracking down Futaba Senda, a Chorus Club member who was allegedly in a relationship with Kano.
8	"What Is This Wavering Emotion?"; Transliteration: "Yureugoku Kimochitte, Nani?" (Japanese: 揺れ動く気持ちって、なに？)	Rei Ōwada	Keiichi Hasegawa	Yūichi Abe	May 21, 2021
Sizumu comes across a kaiju, but it is incomplete and deformed, so he decides to ignore it. Koyomi recalls how while he was in high school, he came across Inamoto finding a bag full of money and asking him to run away with her, but he fled in fear instead. Yomogi and Yume try to track down Futaba with little success. Gauma learns about the kaiju and summons the group, and they manage to capture it. Gauma attempts to dominate it, but fails as his power appears to have weakened. The other members of the crew decide to try it as well, and while they all fail, Yomogi seems to have an adverse reaction for a brief moment. Knight and the Second then arrive and explain that kaiju are born out of human emotions and recommend killing it before it can become a threat, but the crew decides to spare it with Gauma promising to keep an eye on it. However, the kaiju escapes and grows larger, becoming a threat to the city. Yomogi and Knight deploy together and the Dyna Soldier becomes the Dynamic Cannon, wielded by Gridknight. Though he wonders if kaiju are capable of having hearts, Yomogi attempts to dominate the kaiju with limited success and destroys it with the Dynamic Cannon in order to protect the city and Yume. Afterwards, Yume thanks Yomogi for protecting her and offers to go out and eat with him.
9	"What Are These Overlapping Emotions?"; Transliteration: "Kasanaru Kimochitte, Nani?" (Japanese: 重なる気持ちって、なに？)	Akira Furukawa	Keiichi Hasegawa	Yoshiyuki Kaneko	May 28, 2021
Chise discovers a small, golden dragon-like Kaiju in her room who responds to her commands, which she names Goldburn. While Chise ponders about what to do with Goldburn, Futaba Senda has a meeting with Yume and Yomogi. Yume reprimands Futaba for not being at her sister's side when she needed it and falls into despair, just when Juuga takes control of another Kaiju. Yomogi attends to Yume's request to join the others ahead of her but Gauma sends him back to pick her up. Chise attempts to convince Yume to assist them, when Goldburn suddenly appears and Yomogi pushes him away to protect Yume, mistaking him for an enemy. Yume ends up falling off the tower while attempting to pick up her sister's puzzle that fell from her hand, but Goldburn rescues her. Together, Yomogi, Yume, and Goldburn rescue Gauma, Koyomi, and Knight from the enemy Kaiju, and the six combine into Kaiser Gridknight to defeat it. After the battle, Juuga points out that the Kaiju Eugenicists will eventually run out of Kaiju to take control and the Dynazenon crew accept Goldburn as part of their team, while inviting the Gridknight Alliance to attend the nearby festival, but they arrive too late to enjoy the festivities and decide to hold their own fireworks party instead.
10	"Which Memories Do You Regret?"; Transliteration: "Omoi Nokoshita Kiokutte, Nani?" (Japanese: 思い残した記憶って、なに？)	Hideyuki Satake	Keiichi Hasegawa	Kai Ikarashi	June 4, 2021
The Kaiju Eugenicists come across another kaiju and attempt to dominate it, but all of them mysteriously disappear instead. Meanwhile, as the Dynazenon crew are enjoying the day, they are sent into shock as the kaiju makes Yume, Koyomi, Gauma, and Knight disappear one by one. While Goldburn protects Chise and Second, Yomogi leaps into the kaiju's mouth to rescue his friends. Inside, Yomogi finds out that the kaiju has trapped everybody in their own memories. He enters Yume's memory, which takes place shortly before Kano's death and he convinces Yume to confront Kano. Kano assures Yume she was not suicidal and always cared about Yume. Koyomi is brought back to the memory of Inamoto finding the bag of money, and he decides to run away with her. Gauma returns to 5,000 years ago when he was part of the Kaiju Eugenicists and relives betraying and killing them. Knight relives his time as Akane Shinjo's minion. Yomogi manages to free Koyomi, Gauma, and Knight from their memories and everybody breaks out from the kaiju, combining into Kaiser Gridknight and destroying it. With the world returned to normal, Yume comes to terms with Kano's death as her friends celebrate their victory.
11	"What Wish Can't Come True?"; Transliteration: "Hatasenu Negaitte, Nani?" (Japanese: 果たせぬ願いって、なに？)	Keita Nagahara	Keiichi Hasegawa	Keita Nagahara	June 11, 2021
After the battle, the Kaiju Eugenicists discover that they are out of Kaiju to fight with and disband. With their mission apparently over, Gauma retrieves Dynazenon from the others, but is disheartened that he never managed to reunite with his beloved Princess. Koyomi decides to look for a job and Chise attempts to return to school, when Knight and The Second reveal to her that they will soon depart to another world, taking Goldburn with them. Yume asks Yomogi to accompany her to visit her family's grave, paying respects for her sister for the first time after her death. On their way back, Yomogi confesses his love for Yume when Sizumu attacks them. Gauma stops him, and discovers that due to becoming a human, his resurrected body will not last for long and will soon die. Sizumu reveals that there is one Kaiju left inside his body and uses it to transform into a Kaiju himself. With Koyomi absent and Gauma weakened, Knight takes Goldburn and Dynazenon to form Kaiser Gridknight and confront Sizumu alone, but is overpowered by the enemy.
12	"What Was I Entrusted With?"; Transliteration: "Takusareta Monotte, Nani?" (Japanese: 託されたものって、なに？)	Yūichi Shimodaira	Keiichi Hasegawa	Akira Amemiya	June 18, 2021
Sizumu absorbs the other Kaiju Eugenicists to become stronger and defeats Kaiser Gridknight. Gauma and the others arrive to help and the team recompose to stand against the enemy. Amidst the battle, Yomogi uses his newly awakened Kaiju User power to upset the Kaiju and the Dynazenon Crew form Dynazenon to destroy it with Knight and Goldburn's help, killing all the Kaiju Eugenicists with it. After the battle, Gauma thanks the others for meeting them and passes away, with Dynazenon deactivating. Three months later, Goldburn is recovered from his wounds and departs to another world with Knight and Second, taking the Dynazenon with them. Koyomi gets a job thanks to Inamoto's husband and Chise still has not returned to her school, which was struck by the last battle and is still in repairs. Yomogi and Yume, now a couple, participate in the school festival together, hoping to never forget the memories of their adventure. Meanwhile, it is revealed Knight and Second have brought Dynazenon to the digital world, where it revives and comes to life.
