= List of Toilet-Bound Hanako-kun episodes =

Toilet-Bound Hanako-kun is a Japanese anime television series adapted from the manga of the same name written and illustrated by AidaIro. It is animated by Studio Hibari's subsidiary Lerche and directed by Masaomi Andō, with Yasuhiro Nakanishi writing the scripts, Mayuka Itou designing the characters, and Hiroshi Takaki composing the music. The series aired from January 10 to March 27, 2020, on TBS, SUN, CBC, and BS-TBS. (Note: TBS lists the series premiere on January 9 at 25:58, which is effectively January 10 at 1:58 a.m. JST.) The opening theme song is "No. 7", performed by Jibaku Shōnen Band, while the ending theme song is "Tiny Light", performed by Akari Kitō. Funimation licensed the series for a SimulDub, which following Sony's acquisition of the namesake platform thereafter, it was moved to Crunchyroll.

The second season aired from January 12 to March 30, 2025, on all JNN affiliates, including TBS. The opening theme song is "L'oN", performed by Masayoshi Ōishi, while the ending theme song is "With a Wish", performed by Akari Kitō. Following the finale of the second season, a second cours was announced, and is set to air on July 6, 2025.

== Episodes ==
=== Season 1 (2020) ===
No.	Title (Note: All English titles are taken from Crunchyroll.)	Directed by	Storyboarded by	Original release date
1	"Hanako-san of the Bathroom"; Transliteration: "Toire no Hanako-san" (Japanese: トイレの花子さん)	Yoshito Nishoji	Masaomi Ando	January 10, 2020
In Kamome Academy, there are seven mysteries. The seventh, and most famous one of all, is "Hanako-san of the Toilet", a ghost girl said to reside in the third stall of the girls' bathroom on the third floor, with the ability to grant a single wish for the appropriate price. Nene Yashiro, a first-year high school student, approaches the cubicle intending to wish for a happy romance with her crush and popular senior student Teru Minamoto, only to realise that the "Hanako-san" of the rumours is actually a boy. Yashiro and Hanako work together, consulting tips and tricks from a self-help book, only to fail every time. As Yashiro laments Hanako's lack of ghostly magical items to help her, she discovers a pair of mermaid scales from him that are traditionally used in match-making: the people who swallow these will be cursed greatly, but tied by an unbreakable bond. Yashiro swallows the scale but inadvertently overhears Teru revealing that he likes a girl. Without anyone to share the curse with, she turns into a fish – the servant of a monstrous mermaid. Yashiro apologises for her behaviour, realising that she was actually fine with anyone so as long as she was loved. Hanako defeats the mermaid as it comes to collect its new servant, and agrees to swallow the other scale, reducing the curse on her so that she will only turn into a fish when she comes into contact with water, and allowing him to manifest a physical body. At the same time, she now shares a bond with someone, fulfilling two of her wishes.
2	"The Faeries"; Transliteration: "Yōsei-san" (Japanese: ようせいさん)	Yoshihide Yusumi	Masaomi Ando	January 17, 2020
Yashiro becomes Hanako's human assistant and is forced to spend her afternoons cleaning the toilets for him. Incidents of people losing things suddenly spike in school, culminating with even the loss of the school's locker doors. Aoi Akane, Yashiro's best friend and the school's most popular girl, tells her of the recent rumour "Yousei-san", horrifying faeries that purposely steal from humans, and the warning never to look these apparitions in the eye. Yashiro accidentally stumbles upon a trail of the lost things and espies a monstrous creature with multiple eyeballs, but Hanako saves her from it. The creature splits into numerous small, pink rabbit-like supernaturals known as Mokke, kleptomaniac supernaturals that have lived peacefully with humankind for thousands of years. As supernaturals are unable to go against their rumours lest they disappear from the world, Hanako asks that Yashiro change the Mokke's rumours for him that is charged with the duty to maintain the school's supernaturals. Yashiro starts calling Hanako with a "-kun" as a suffix to show that they are friends. A third-year middle school student and young exorcist Kou Minamoto arrives at the rooftop to exorcise Hanako. As Yashiro defends him, she is disturbed by Kou's warnings that Hanako is a dangerous and murderous spirit, who uses a kitchen knife as his weapon of choice due to him having killed someone with it. Although Kou initially gains the upper hand with his Minamoto family's sacred lightning weapon, Hanako successfully incapacitates him and expresses hope in the young boy's potential. He then vows that he will not disappear because God gave him this role of managing supernaturals to atone for his sins when he was still alive. Yashiro expresses her concerns for him after the skirmish, to which Hanako comments that she can still be friends with a murderer and walks off cheerfully. It is only then that Yashiro realises she doesn't know anything about him.
3	"The Misaki Stairs Part 1"; Transliteration: "Misaki Kaidan Sono Ichi" (Japanese: ミサキ階段其の一)	Imamura	Shunichiro Semura	January 24, 2020
To cheer Yashiro up, Aoi tells her of No. 2 of the Seven Mysteries, the "Misaki Stairs", a staircase outside the art room of the school where the fourth step is the entrance to the world of the dead. Anyone who enters is then shredded to pieces and has their blood dripped on the staircase at twilight. The next day however, Yashiro discovers that Aoi's very existence has disappeared in the school, from her items to even everyone's memories of her. Frightened and confused, Yashiro seeks out Hanako's help, and Kou also reveals how his classmates Yokō and Satou are missing. Hanako guesses that the students have wandered into "boundaries", areas of the Far Shore where apparitions and forgotten things reside separate from the Near Shore, where the living stay. Of the seven boundaries in the school that link to the spirit world, one of these gateways is the fourth step of the Misaki Stairs, guarded by the second mystery. The three venture into the Japanese shrine-like environment of the boundary. They are greeted by a phone call from the mystery herself, introducing herself as a schoolteacher named Misaki that died here, and requests that they find her body parts. Finding one body part will open a single gate for them reaching towards the top of the boundary. Should they fail to do so within the time limit, a huge pair of scissors starts chasing them, along with faceless Japanese dolls. They resolve to destroy No. 2's yorishiro, a precious object that gives power to the mystery, so that she will relinquish her boundary. As they approach the final gate, Yashiro wonders who is the one making the phone calls if they need to find "Misaki"'s body for her.
4	"The Misaki Stairs Part 2"; Transliteration: "Misaki Kaidan Sono Ni" (Japanese: ミサキ階段其の二)	Kosaku Taniguchi	Yusuke Shibata	January 31, 2020
The three encounter the body of a hideous doll, its parts assembled by them. They are then greeted by the caller, a beautiful woman dressed in traditional Japanese clothing, whom Hanako recognises as No. 2 of the Seven Mysteries. As No. 2 tries to make the doll walk, it fails and she shows them the bodies of all those who wandered into her boundary and failed to accomplish the same task she made them do, now carved into faceless dolls. Hanako and Kou begin fighting against her, but they are at a disadvantage due to the area being her territory, hence amplifying her power. Deducing that the deepest part of the barrier is likely to be below the submerged ground where they had been standing on, Hanako pushes Yashiro off a cliff, and she awakens in a sunlit shrine. Yashiro finds an exercise book with diary entries written in sloppy children's handwriting, where every entry contains teacher's comments from "Misaki". Each page details the child's growth as she becomes more cheerful and outgoing, and her handwriting improves as well. About halfway through, the teacher's comments disappear and each entry begins recording a day where Misaki doesn't return to the shrine, as well as an incident where a teacher fell down the steps and died. The book ends on a chilling note as the child decides to "make a Misaki". Just then, No. 2 arrives, and despite Yashiro's pleads that Misaki would never wish for her to do such a thing, remains stubborn and determines to slice her up, but Hanako arrives to protect her. Yashiro successfully locates a pair of scissors offered by Misaki in the shrine as No. 2's yorishiro and destroys the seal upon it, causing the boundary to collapse. Returning to the school, Hanako reveals the real identity of No. 2 to be a talking fox statue called Yako, and kisses Yashiro on her cheek, calling it a "protective charm". Kou, who had been turned into a stuffed doll, is left forgotten. Meanwhile, a black crane that has been watching the three returns to its masters, a boy and a mysterious girl who is likely the source of rumours around the school.
5	"The Confession Tree"; Transliteration: "Kokuhaku no Ki" (Japanese: 告白の木)	Michita Shiraishi	Mizuka Saito	February 7, 2020
Yashiro is confused and embarrassed to face Hanako after the kiss, which both her and Aoi misinterpret as Hanako liking her romantically. The recent increase in school couples also prompts Aoi to tell Yashiro of the rumour of the Confession Tree, a magical tree where anyone who confesses underneath it will become a couple, even those of the same gender. Adding on to her fantasies, Hanako confesses to Yashiro under the Tree, but prompts Yashiro to reject. This summons a kodama supernatural from within that has been the source of all the odd couples in school, which Hanako defeats and reduces to the size of a broccoli. As Yashiro leaves totally heartbroken and embarrassed, Hanako apologizes to her for getting her hopes up, as the kiss was actually really just a protective charm to ward off apparitions. Yashiro decides to find out more about Hanako herself. On the school rooftop, they encounter Teru, who is revealed to be Kou's older brother. Teru gives the indecisive Kou one last chance to exorcise Hanako. Failing to get information from Hanako about himself, Yashiro turns to library books, encountering the boy and the girl who have been watching them, although this is unbeknownst to her. The girl encourages Yashiro to seek out No. 5 of the Seven Mysteries if she is truly keen on learning more about Hanako. Aoi tells Yashiro of the fifth mystery "the 4 o' Clock Library", a special repository in the library filled with books of the past, present and future of every member of the school, and can only be entered at 4 o' clock, hence the name. Of these books, the white ones are about the living, the black about the dead, and the red ones are simply forbidden books. As Yashiro contemplates finding Hanako's book, the mysterious girl and boy watches on the scene, a figure resembling Hanako behind her.
6	"The 4pm Bookstacks"; Transliteration: "16-ji no Shoko" (Japanese: 16時の書庫)	Sakurako Mitsuhashi	Shunichiro Semura	February 14, 2020
Accompanied by Kou, Yashiro seeks out the 4 o' Clock Library. Instead of finding Hanako's book, Yashiro glances at her own and in the "Future" section, sees herself finding out Hanako's real identity and learns his real name: Amane Yugi. However, the pages turn red and a humongous shadow-like reflection of herself appears to devour the both of them, although Hanako arrives just in time to slay the creature. They then meet No. 5 of the Seven Mysteries and the curator of the library: a spider-like supernatural named Tsuchigomori who displays an outward persona as a teacher in school. As the leader of the Seven Mysteries in charge of maintaining balance between the Near and Far Shore, Hanako deduces the existence of a traitorous supernatural changing the school's rumours, proposing to destroy every Mystery's yorishiro temporarily as a safety measure. After a brief skirmish where Tsuchigomori forces Kou and Yashiro to blurt out their most embarrassing secrets, he lets only Yashiro follow him to the deepest part of the Boundary, where she destroys his yorishiro. Similar to the Misaki Stairs incident, Yashiro views the memories within it and sees Tsuchigomori as a teacher tending to the wounds of an alive Hanako, or Amane. As a student, Amane always got injured mysteriously and had a great passion for astrology, although he vows to give up his future instead, gifting Tsuchigomori a "moon rock" believed to be a real piece of the moon that the former has safeguarded as his yorishiro till today. Waking up in the infirmary, Tsuchigomori reveals that Amane is the only person who has ever changed his predetermined future, and is still honouring his promise today by staying in the school as a supernatural.
7	"The Donuts"; Transliteration: "Dōnattsu" (Japanese: ドーナツ)	Yasuyuki Fuse	Masaomi Ando	February 21, 2020
Yashiro has no idea how to face Hanako after learning more about him. Recalling that he enjoys donuts, Kou asks for Yashiro's help in making them and the two grow closer, promising to support each other in their quest to find out more about Hanako. Kou stands up to his brother and declares that he will watch over Hanako and learn more about him instead of exorcising him straightaway, prompting Teru to continue observing the situation from afar for now. On the rooftop, Yashiro offers a happy Hanako his donuts, although their peace is interrupted by an unexpected guest that looks and sounds exactly like Hanako, traumatizing him greatly. In the broadcast room, the uninvited guest is revealed to be Tsukasa, Hanako's younger identical twin brother, who is the perpetrator behind the altered school rumors, alongside the mysterious girl Sakura Nanamine and a boy Natsuhiko Hyūga. Sakura spreads another rumor about a ghost boy haunting the middle school shoe lockers, which Kou catches and determines to help sever his ties to the Near Shore.
8	"Mitsuba"; Transliteration: "Mitsuba" (Japanese: ミツバ)	Yoshihide Yusumi	Shunichiro Semura	February 28, 2020
Kou has his work cut out for him as the ghost, Mitsuba Soūsuke, is a girly, narcissistic and cocky young boy that loves nothing more than to insult him. Believing his regret to be taking a photo of a certain something, Mitsuba goes around school, choosing to take photos of scenery, flora and fauna rather than people. Kou's good friend Yokoō espies Mitsuba's camera in Kou's hand and reminds him of the time when they were first-year middle school students together in the same class, until Mitsuba died in an accident just last winter. Mitsuba reveals that due to bullying in elementary school he resorted to becoming a quiet, shy boy in middle school, but that backfired and made him a plain wallflower unable to make friends instead, to the point where nobody remembered him even after he called out to them at the shoe lockers. Kou assures Mitsuba that the two of them can be friends even after one of them is dead, to which Mitsuba responds by taking a secret photo of Kou, calling it "something precious to me". They are interrupted soon by Tsukasa, who turns Mitsuba into a gruesome half-supernatural revolving around the rumour of a bent-necked ghost boy hovering around the lockers, in response to Mitsuba's real wish: to have friends and stay with them forever. This forces Hanako to kill Mitsuba, who tells Kou that there is no future for the dead. At home, Kou develops the photos Mitsuba took and finds the one of himself before crying next to Mitsuba's camera on his bed.
9	"The Tea Party"; Transliteration: "Ochakai" (Japanese: お茶会)	Yasuyuki Fuse	Mizuka Saito	March 6, 2020
Yashiro is kidnapped to have tea with Sakura, and the two end up grouching about their own contracts they have made. However, this is all just a ruse to have her let down her guard, and Yashiro ends up being chained to a chair and drowned into a place of nowhere — a place that is neither a Boundary nor a part of the Far or Near Shore. Because it is nowhere, it is also a place that can lead to anywhere, with numerous doors leading to different destinations all over different worlds and across time. Together with Natsuhiko, who was also dragged in, they experiment with different doors that are familiar per Hanako's orders, who has managed to contact them via radio. Natsuhiko quickly winds up being dragged into a random door carelessly, and Yashiro manages to locate a door resembling that of the school's homeroom. She meets Amane on 18 July 1969, who was injured and crying in an empty classroom. Amane leaves quickly, but drops a key with a rocket keychain on it that she picks up, just as Hanako locates her. Returning to the girls' bathroom, Hanako apologizes for ruining the donuts and welcomes her home, with Yashiro choosing to keep quiet about the key and find a way to protect him. In a post-credits scene, Tsukasa is seen morbidly doodling a drawing with blood and speaking to a figure resembling Mitsuba.
10	"The Hell of Mirrors Part 1"; Transliteration: "Kagamijigoku Sono Ichi" (Japanese: カガミジゴク其の一)	Yōhei Fukui	Katsuhiko Nishijima & Yu Kinome	March 13, 2020
Yashiro informs Hanako and Kou about a certain occurrence of weird arms photobombing of some of the school photos. Later on, an arm drags Yashiro to one of the mirrors within Hanako's domain: the bathroom. Then Yashiro transports to the otherworldly boundary within the spirited mirror. Along the way, she encounters Mitsuba and thought of him as her prince charming. Much to dismay, the latter just insulted the former of her 'daikon' legs. The case worsens when Yashiro encounters mirrors with the reflections of her comrades, insulting her ankles. During Yashiro's ordeal, Kou and Hanako struggled to enter to the cursed mirror. As for Yashiro and Mitsuba, they got a hard time dealing with the School Wonder of the boundary. Tsukasa then goes to the rescue and brutally murders the Wonder, for Mitsuba's sake.
11	"The Hell of Mirrors Part 2"; Transliteration: "Kagamijigoku Sono Ni" (Japanese: カガミジゴク其の二)	Yasuyuki Fuse	Yu Kinome & Mizuka Saito	March 20, 2020
After Tsukasa murdered the former wonder, he then grabs the "heart" of the apparition to feed it to Mitsuba, for the latter to be the new School Wonder of The Hell of Mirrors. Kou and Hanako asked help from Tsuchigomori and Yako to enter the said boundary. Mitsuba doesn't want to consume the heart being offered to him and Yashiro tells Tsukasa to stop forcing. Tsukasa was about to hit Yashiro in the floor but then the boy remembers to be gentle with girls and instead, sedates her. Kou and Hanako successfully enters the boundary and then they encountered an overpowered Mitsuba. Tsukasa then bribes Mitsuba about the fact that he will make his wish come true of becoming a human. Hanako interferes with the thought, leading to Mitsuba, attacking them out of control. As the boundary was crumbling during their fight, debris was about to fall to the sleeping Yashiro and with Mitsuba's conscience, he covered her and instead, for diplomatic reasons, drags the girl, together with Hanako and Kou using the "arms" within the mirror to leave the boundary. The trio returned to the bathroom unconscious yet safe.
12	"The Little Mermaid"; Transliteration: "Ningyo Hime" (Japanese: 人魚姫)	Yoshito Nishoji & Masaomi Ando	Masaomi Ando	March 27, 2020
Yashiro is approached by a colony of talking fish, requesting that she ingest the lifeblood of their mistress the mermaid to rewrite her contract with Hanako, becoming a princess. Although she initially refuses, she is struck by the reminder that she knows almost nothing about Hanako, and that he may only just be using her, coupled with the fact that she can get a harem in the underwater world. Approaching supernaturals for help, Yako warns Yashiro of the dangers of interacting with the Far Shore, and Tsuchigomori leaves it up to her decision, hinting that Hanako is simply afraid of her knowing about his past. Her conversation with Tsuchigomori is overheard by Hanako, who was hiding behind the curtain. At the end of the day, Yashiro refuses the fish, but they forcefully drag her into the water and tempt her into almost drinking the blood until Hanako lifts her out of the water and scares the fish away. Hanako briefly tells her how he had Tsukasa for a younger twin brother but killed him, and promises that he will tell her the rest someday, hoping for her to stay as his assistant by his side until then. Tsukasa is shown spreading rumors while Sakura scolds him for making pranks and Natsuhiko for laughing while Mitsuba watches them. Yashiro recalls the first time she screamed when Hanako responded to her knocks, and smiles as he calls out to her in a similar fashion in the toilet, no longer afraid, holding Hanako's hand.

=== Season 2 (2025) ===
No.	Title	Directed by	Storyboarded by	Original release date
Part 1
1	"Hanako-kun of the Bathroom"; Transliteration: "Toire no Hanako-kun" (Japanese: トイレの花子くん)	Atsuko Tonomizu	Yōhei Fukui	January 12, 2025
Aoi informs Nene about a new apparition called the Three Clock Keepers who control time. One keeper controls the past, one controls the present, and the third controls the future. Nene enlists Kou and Hanako to help deal with the clock keepers after a number of time-related disasters occur in the school, including a classroom and several students being aged up. At first, the trio are stuck with no leads, but Hanako suspects that Aoi might be linked to the clock keepers, as she was not aged up or affected by their magic. They run into Aoi after the windows in a classroom shatter, and Hanako possesses Nene and tries to interrogate Aoi. This leads Aoi's admirer, Akane, to intervene and drag Nene to the rooftop. Akane is livid that "Nene" interrogated the girl he is smitten with and threatens "her". After Akane hits Nene with a bat, Hanako is exorcised from her body and she regains control. The trio explain to Akane that Aoi seems off lately and he agrees to help investigate. Despite carefully following Aoi around, the group cannot find anything suspicious. Due to this, Hanako takes matters into his own hands and drops a ceiling light onto Aoi. Akane intervenes by stopping time and revealing to the trio that he is one of the clock keepers.
2	"The Three Clock Keepers"; Transliteration: "Sannin no Tokei Mori" (Japanese: 三人の時計守)	Ai Tokaido	Hiromitsu Kanazawa	January 19, 2025
Akane is revealed to possess the time stop ability of the first clock keeper, the clock keeper of the present. Enraged at Hanako for endangering Aoi, Akane moves to strike Hanako. Nene intervenes and Akane is left shocked that somebody who is not an apparition could resist his time stop. Afterwards, Akane explains how he obtained the power to stop time. One of the clock keepers had instigated an incident that nearly killed Aoi, which led to Akane accepting the power to stop time in order to save her. Akane asks Hanako why he approached him, but before Hanako can answer, a crisis occurs. A large portion of the student body are turned into senior citizens by the clock keeper of the future, Mirai. The group puts other matters aside and teams up to capture Mirai. However, Mirai proves to be difficult to catch due to her speed, so Nene proposes laying a trap. Using a candy trail, the group manages to trick Mirai and capture her. Before Mirai is fully captured, she tries to age Nene, but Nene simply dies. Hanako explains that Nene was already close to her death and does not have more than a year left in terms of life expectancy. The clock keeper of the past arrives, and Hanako has them reverse time back to the start of the day. Kou is dismayed that he will lose his memories of the day and his awareness of Nene's impending death; however, Akane agrees to freeze Kou's time so that he can preserve what he knows.
3	"Lost and Found"; Transliteration: "Sagashimono" (Japanese: さがしもの)	Mitsuyo Yokono	Hiromitsu Kanazawa	January 26, 2025
Teru warns Kou about trusting Hanako during a sparring session. Nene is approached by Yako, who is incensed over the new rule behind her staircase. Nene recalls that instead of the 4th step of the Misaki staircase leading to death, it now leads to romantic breakups, while avoiding the 4th step and climbing to the top guarantees relationship success. Yako finds all the couples who come and flirt at her staircase to be very annoying. After their talk, Nene heads to the science room to try and find Hanako. Instead of Hanako, she finds Kou, who is chasing Tsuchigomori around the room with insects, trying to bribe him for advice. Nene and Kou spend some time talking, but Kou finds it hard to communicate with Nene due to knowing about her impending death. As Nene takes her leave, Tsuchigomori tells Kou that he has no advice for him as Nene's death is unavoidable. Tsuchigomori shows Kou a book that contains Nene's past and future, and tells Kou that whatever is written is absolutely predestined to occur. The book says that the big event in Nene's life on the current date will be to share a kiss with Hanako. Kou heads out to try and prove the book wrong. After running around the school and missing Hanako by a hair at multiple locations, Nene finally manages to find him on the roof. True to the book, Nene gives Hanako a kiss to raise his spirits. Kou arrives too late, unable to prevent the content of the book from coming true. Hanako is happy due to Nene's kiss and walks away smiling.
4	"Summer Lights"; Transliteration: "Natsu Akari" (Japanese: 夏灯り)	Kazu Fujiwara	Yōhei Fukui	February 2, 2025
Kou contemplates how he can prevent Nene from dying in the future and whether he is making the right decision. Hanako tells Kou to cheer up, otherwise Nene will catch on. Nene invites Kou to a festival using the Mokke as her delivery service. Nene notices that Hanako is just feeling left out as he is a location-bound spirit and cannot go to a summer festival. After Nene points this out, Hanako suggests holding a festival at the school. Kou arrives at the Misaki stairs as Hanako instructed and is surprised to see that the festival is one of apparitions. Shortly after, Nene arrives, leaving Kou and Hanako shocked at how attractive she looks in her festival clothing. The trio enjoy the festival, going from stall to stall and checking out the various activities. While enjoying the festival, Kou notices that their purchases come with colored pieces of paper. Hanako explains that the papers are Tanzaku, and that there is a rumor that writing a wish on every color will lead to the wish being granted. Knowing this, Kou and Nene get excited and start collecting the paper wherever they can. Neither manages to obtain all the colors, but they have fun with the goal. Later, the trio head to watch the fireworks, and Nene gets hit by a charging bull apparition. She wakes up in a different time period, and finds the historical version of Hanako, Yugi Amane, from 1964. After spending some time together, Yugi tells Nene that he wants to be an astronaut when he grows up. Nene is moved by his wish and how nice he is and gives Yugi her Tanzaku, telling him to use them to make his dream come true. Afterwards, Nene realizes she can collide with a bull to go back to her own time, so she leaves Yugi behind after kissing him on the forehead. It is revealed that Yugi Amane used the Tanzaku to wish that he could meet Nene again.
5	"Mokke of the Dead / The Melancholy of the New Number Three"; Transliteration: "Mokke of the Dead / Shin・Sanban no Yuuutsu" (Japanese: もっけ・オブ・ザ・デッド / 新・三番の憂鬱)	Yoshio Suzuki & Ai Tokaido	Noriyuki Noya & Yōhei Fukui	February 9, 2025
A Mokke is seen bound and is pleading while Teru approaches them with a syringe. Nene enters the washroom where Hanako is and he jumps on her with a zombified appearance. Kou arrives and saves Nene, and the zombified Hanako asks them for candy. Kou and Nene run and realize the school is full of candy-obsessed zombies. As they continue running, the two see Mokke bite students and spread the zombie infection. After hiding in a changing room, Kou and Nene meet up with Akane and Teru. They discuss what happened to the school and Teru explains that the disease is called the "Wilting". Akane is infected, but quickly cured when splashed with soda. Teru realizes that salt water exorcises the zombies, and with the help of Kou and Nene, he manages to revert the students and Mokke back to normal. It is revealed that the Mokke infection started due to Teru bringing a wild Mokke to school to purify it, but it escaped. Later on, Mitsuba spends some time wandering the school after Tsukasa him. Mitsuba further falls into a slump as he realizes that he doesn't fit in either as an apparition or as a human. He nearly gets exorcised by Teru when he runs into him, but is saved at the last minute. After heading back to the clubroom, it turns out that his friends threw him a welcome party. Mitsuba is left touched by the gesture and starts feeling like he has a home. As the party continues, Tsukasa unveils the fourth wonder of the school and ominously says that he will make everyone's wishes come true.
6	"Make Believe"; Transliteration: "Esoragoto" (Japanese: エソラゴト)	Yuki Nagasawa	Yōhei Fukui	February 16, 2025
Nene arrives at class and notices that Hanako-kun is a living student. She is shocked and calls out his name, but he tells her that he is named "Amane" and not Hanako. After feeling his body, Nene realizes that this version of "Hanako" is not a ghost. She remains apprehensive and spends time in class thinking about what to do. After class, while Amane plays soccer, Nene learns that Amane's twin brother is also in the school. As the day goes by, Nene witnesses more things that are inconsistent with her memories and starts questioning what happened to her reality. Kou also notices that something is strange, given that Mitsuba is a living being like Hanako. Nene and Kou finally meet up during the pool cleaning and become aware that they are not alone in remembering a different world. After cleaning the pool, they talk about the situation they are in and Nene notices a girl sketching near the pool. Akane and Aoi show up, and the girl disappears. After Nene describes her, Aoi says that the girl is likely the ghost of Shijima. In the art room, Shijima cuts apart the drawings of Aoi and Akane, after which the duo fall apart by the pool. Nene and Kou are left shocked and try to figure out what happened; they realize the other students are unfazed and that something sinister is occurring. Mitsuba accidentally reveals that the world they are in is fake, and Shijima's ability to create false worlds that entrap their targets is explained.
7	"Make Sense"; Transliteration: "Yomaigoto" (Japanese: ヨマイゴト)	Atsuko Tonomizu	Atsuko Tonomizu	February 23, 2025
Nene and Kou are on the run and realize that most people at their school have had their memories and personalities tampered with by Shijima's ability. After talking to Mitsuba, they are informed by him that if they hate the fake world, they can talk to Shijima, who is residing in the twisted tower. They enter the tower and run into Shijima, who comments on Nene's legs. After introducing themselves, Nene and Kou ask Shijima how they can get back to their world. Shijima lets them know that killing Mitsuba and Amane in the dream world is the only way to get back home. She provides them with weapons and tells them that there is nothing wrong with killing fictional characters. Kou and Nene are terrified at the prospect and instead try to turn on Shijima, but she easily restrains them. Shijima allows them to leave, but reminds them of her ultimatum: either they deny the fictional world by killing their best friends or they stay trapped. They meet up with Amane and Tsukasa and watch shooting stars together; Nene realizes she is unable to kill Amane.
8	"Make It Sound Nice"; Transliteration: "Kireigoto" (Japanese: キレイゴト)	Rei Mano	Hiromitsu Kanazawa & Yusuke Saito	March 3, 2025
As the meteor shower wraps up, Tsukasa whispers to Nene that she should kill Amane properly. Later on, they head to the school roof with a telescope and stargaze with the other students. Akane and Aoi appear and show no signs of harm despite having previously been dismantled. Nene and Amane take a look at the star Antares and talk about how it overshadows its twin. Nene confesses to Amane that she loves Hanako and indirectly implies she loves Amane as well. She then tries to convince Amane to escape to the real world with her. Kou confronts Mitsuba about what the fourth wonder said, and Mitsuba transforms into his true form. Mitsuba shows Kou what happened through his mirrors and how Tsukasa convinced him to step into the painted world. While Mitsuba wants to remain in the painted world, Kou rejects the fake world and fights Mitsuba with the intention of escaping. At the end of their fight, Kou offers his death so that he can be a ghost alongside Mitsuba. However, Mitsuba rejects his proposition, as he wants Kou to live. Nene and Amane also agree to escape together.
9	"Make It Secret"; Transliteration: "Kakushigoto" (Japanese: カクシゴト)	Hazuki Mizumoto	Takanari Sato	March 9, 2025
Nene reaches the school gate and tries to talk Amane into leaving with her, but he resists. Amane acknowledges he got caught up in Nene's pace, but he enjoys the school and has no reason to leave. Nene presses Amane harder, and he eventually relents. They ride a bike together into town after leaving school. On the bike, Nene explains her plan to Amane. She explains that they need to keep riding until they reach the end of the world, on the basis that Shijima's painting cannot be unlimited in scope. They try to hop on a bus and then a taxi, but every time the adults they come across end up being Shijima in disguise. While on the run, the duo come across a floating paintbrush that offers them a way out. While Nene is figuring out how to escape, Amane snaps the brush and puts Nene to sleep. Back at the school, Amane runs into Mitsuba and Kou, who question why Nene passed out. Amane transforms into Hanako and explains that he arranged for everyone to live happily in Shijima's painting. Hanako then leaves with Nene, determined to hold out until the painted world is complete, all so that Nene can live forever in the painting.
10	"Make a Wish"; Transliteration: "Negaigoto" (Japanese: ネガイゴト)	Mako Shiina & Yuki Nagasawa	Takanari Sato & Hiromitsu Kanazawa	March 16, 2025
Nene fakes being unconscious and overhears Hanako explain her shortened lifespan. Hanako leaves the scene with a secretly alert Nene with the goal of locking her up until the painted world is perfected. After placing Nene in a jail cell, Hanako is about to leave, but Nene "wakes up" and presses Hanako on his motivations. Explaining that the painted world is a happier world, Hanako believes that Nene is better off living in it. Nene further presses Hanako about her impending death, to the shock of Hanako, who realizes she overheard. Left in tears over her uncertain future and Hanako making the decision to trap her without her consent, Nene falls to her knees and starts crying. Hanako leans over and kisses Nene on her forehead and comforts her, after which he leaves her in the cell with the intention of picking her up after the painted world is completed. Shijima checks in on Nene and tells her that Hanako actually hates fake worlds like her painted world, but that he cannot destroy it because he wants to keep Nene alive. Faking being despondent, Nene convinces Shijima to hold her hands but instead restrains Shijima against the cell bars and threatens her. Shijima calls Nene's bluff and tells her that she would be better off in the painted world. Nene is about to relent, but Tsukasa arrives and breaks her out. Tsukasa sends Nene and Shijima to another reality in order to make Shijima's wish real. Kou and Mitsuba talk through the revelations that Kou experienced and run into the brush that Hanako broke. In the other reality, a hospital, Shijima is shown being gravely ill. The 4th wonder of the school goes to kill the bedridden Shijima Mei, but Nene intervenes, and the two manage to escape.
11	"Make It About You"; Transliteration: "Hitorigoto" (Japanese: ヒトリゴト)	Rei Mano	Hiromitsu Kanazawa & Takanari Sato	March 23, 2025
Nene and the hospitalized Shijima Mei enjoy a meal together. Mei tells Nene a bit of her past, and Nene starts to see inconsistencies between the rumor behind the 4th wonder of the school and the real Mei. The real Mei died of disease, and her parents had wholeheartedly supported her dreams. It is shown in a flashback that the rumor, while based in reality at the start, spiraled out of control and became a false narrative. The spirit version of Mei grew resentful over the lies around her untimely demise, and these lies ironically catapulted her into becoming a stronger apparition. As the 4th wonder was created through the final painting of the living Mei, her greatest wish was that the painting was never drawn, as it led to Mei being slandered after her death. Mei's apparition version tries to kill her a few times, but she escapes with Nene. As they leave the hospital, Nene realizes she cannot follow Mei, as Mei is going to wake up in a different timeline. Nene asks Mei if she is scared of dying, but before she receives an answer, the apparition version reaches them. Both versions talk to each other and reconcile; the original Mei accepts her fate and walks up the glass staircase. When the dream ends, Nene ends up back in the painted world with Mitsuba and Kou. They discuss escaping, and the apparition version of Mei is now on their side; however, she explains that she absolutely cannot defy her nature as a school wonder and must finish the painting. Due to this, Nene has to decide if she will focus on reconciling with Hanako or on escaping the painting. While she struggles over the decision, the floating brush appears and Kou explains they found it. The brush is a part of Shijima Mei, the part that wanted to help Nene, and it explains that there is an emergency exit from the painting.
12	"Picture Perfect"; Transliteration: "Esoragoto" (Japanese: 絵空事)	Yōhei Fukui	Yōhei Fukui	March 30, 2025
The group follow the brush and walk up a staircase on the side of the tower. Nene and Kou reminisce over their stay in the painted world and ponder the nature of apparitions. They reach the top of the building, and Shijima explains that the route out of the painting is through the moon. Hanako is waiting for them and engages in combat to prevent their escape. Nene comes up with a plan while Kou keeps Hanako distracted. She manages to create a flying carriage and retrieve everyone. Hanako, however, disagrees and attempts to bring everyone down to earth again. As he tries to sabotage the carriage, Nene knocks him overboard and they fall down together onto the clouds. To their surprise, the clouds support their weight, and they land softly. They then have a heartfelt talk, with Hanako admitting that he wants Nene to live no matter what, but that he does not like trapping her in the painting either. Nene asks Hanako to make her dreams come true in the real world, so that she can live out the rest of her life. Hanako relents and uses his Haku Joudai ability to propel the carriage and everyone on it upwards, towards the moon. Outside the painting, Nene meets the 4th wonder of the school in her boundary. Shijima explains that her bodies in the paintings are all copies, and that her real self exists in the boundary. Shijima tells Nene how to free everyone else and recommends that she see the first wonder, the Clock Keepers, to figure out how to prevent her upcoming death. After thanking Shijima one last time for creating a beautiful fictional world for everyone, Nene destroys Shijima's artbook and ends her status as a school wonder. With everyone released, Nene goes to the washroom and meets up with Hanako and Kou. Knowing that her lifespan will likely run out soon, she decides to spend her remaining days with Hanako and Kou as usual.
Part 2
13	"Final Exams and a School Sleepover"; Transliteration: "Kimatsu Shiken to Shukuhaku Gakushū" (Japanese: 期末試験と宿泊学習)	Ippei Ichii	Noriaki Saito	July 6, 2025
14	"The Near Shore and the Far Shore"; Transliteration: "Shigan to Higan" (Japanese: しがんとひがん)	Atsuko Tonomizu	Atsuko Tonomizu	July 13, 2025
15	"The Reaper's Sacrifice"; Transliteration: "Shinigami no Ikenie" (Japanese: しにがみのイケニエ)	Hazuki Mizumoto	Goichi Iwahata	July 20, 2025
16	"Sumire"; Transliteration: "Sumire" (Japanese: すみれ)	Rei Mano	Noriaki Saito	July 27, 2025
17	"Aoi and Akane"; Transliteration: "Aoi to Akane" (Japanese: アオイとあかね)	Tokio Yamauchi	Hiromitsu Kanazawa	August 3, 2025
18	"Severance"; Transliteration: "Danzetsu" (Japanese: 断絶)	Yusuke Kamata	Takanari Saito	August 10, 2025
19	"Encounters"; Transliteration: "Souguu" (Japanese: 遭遇)	Yohei Fukui & Nobu Ishida	Noriaki Saito	August 17, 2025
20	"The Red House"; Transliteration: "Akai Ie" (Japanese: あかい いえ)	Atsuko Tonomizu	Atsuko Tonomizu	August 24, 2025
21	"The Curse"; Transliteration: "Noroi" (Japanese: 呪い)	Tokio Yamauchi	Takanari Seto	August 31, 2025
22	"Tsukasa and Amane"; Transliteration: "Tsukasa to Amane" (Japanese: つかさとあまね)	Rei Mano	Rei Mano & Noriaki Saito	September 7, 2025
23	"One-Way Train to the Far Shore"; Transliteration: "Katamichi Ressha Higan-yuki" (Japanese: かたみち れっしゃ ひがん-ゆき)	Hazuki Mizumoto	Takanari Seto	September 14, 2025
24	"Wishes"; Transliteration: "Negai" (Japanese: 願い)	Yohei Fukui	Hiromitsu Kanazawa & Yohei Fukui	September 21, 2025
