= My Oshi Is Now My Boss =

Japanese manga and television series

- Cover of vol. 1, first released on September 15, 2023

推しが上司になりまして (Oshi ga Jōshi ni Narimashite)
- Genre: Romantic comedy
- Manga
- Written by: Yuki Azuma
- Illustrated by: Ito Morinaga
- Published by: DPN Books (digital); HarperCollins Japan (print)
- English publisher: MangaPlaza
- Imprint: Petir Comics
- Original run: November 25, 2021 – present
- Volumes: 3
- Television drama
- Directed by: Ryūichi Honda; Kōji Ono (season 1); Yūya Matsushita (season 1); Shinji Kuma (season 2); Eriko Satō (season 2)
- Produced by: Tatsuya Yamaga (chief); Shōko Kawamura; Aya Oda; Yasutoshi Kigawa (season 1)
- Written by: Naomi Hiruta (season 1); Yūko Imanishi (season 1); Miho Aotsuka (season 1); Yuki Azuma; Rie Izawa (season 1); Junpei Yamaoka (season 1); Aya Watatane (season 2); Kumiko Asō (season 2); Shōko Kawamura (season 2)
- Music by: Scat Gotō (season 1); Shūichirō Fukuhiro (season 2)
- Studio: Axyz
- Licensed by: Doki (season 1)
- Original network: U-Next; TV Tokyo; TV Osaka; TV Aichi; TV Setouchi; TV Hokkaido; TVQ Kyushu Broadcasting
- Original run: October 5, 2023 – December 25, 2025
- Episodes: 24
- icon

My Oshi Is Now My Boss (Japanese: 推しが上司になりまして, Hepburn: Oshi ga Jōshi ni Narimashite) is a Japanese manga series written by Yuki Azuma and illustrated by Ito Morinaga. My Oshi Is Now My Boss is serialized on digital book platforms by DPN Books under the label Kafune since November 25, 2021.

A live-action television drama adaptation was broadcast from October 5, 2023, to December 21, 2023. A second season featuring an original screenplay, titled My Oshi Is Now My Boss: Full Throttle, was broadcast from October 9, 2025, to December 25, 2025.

== Plot ==
Hitomi Nakajo is a fan of 2.5D musical theater actor Toma Kiryu, but he suddenly retires, leaving her in shock. Soon after, Toma reappears in Hitomi's life as Shuichi Takagi, the heir of the CEO and her newly hired boss. Shuichi's charming and friendly demeanor make him popular among the female employees, but Hitomi can only act cold and aloof towards him out of shock from having the opportunity to work with her idol and pretending she knows nothing about his previous career. Shuichi soon becomes drawn to Hitomi, as she is the only person who does not treat him specially for being the company heir.

== Characters ==
Hitomi Nakajo (中条 瞳, Nakajō Hitomi)
Portrayed by: Airi Suzuki
Hitomi is an office employee in her late 20s. She is a big fan of Toma Kiryu, but she keeps it a secret.
Shuichi Takagi (高城 修一, Takagi Shūichi)
Portrayed by: Ryota Katayose
Shuichi is Hitomi's newly hired boss. He previously performed as a theater actor under the stage name Toma Kiryu (桐生 斗真, Kiryū Tōma) and began working at his father's company after retiring. He becomes curious about Hitomi after noticing she provides competent support to him but avoids him directly.

== Media ==
=== Manga ===
My Oshi Is Now My Boss is written by Yuki Azuma and illustrated by Ito Morinaga. It is serialized digitally by DPN Books under the Kafune label on digital book distribution platforms since November 25, 2021. The chapters were later released in three bound volumes by HarperCollins Japan under the Petir Comics imprint. DPN Books also released the series in English digitally through MangaPlaza since June 20, 2024.

No.	Japanese release date	Japanese ISBN
1	September 15, 2023	9784596524225
2	September 15, 2023	9784596524249
3	May 23, 2025	9784596729736

=== Television drama ===
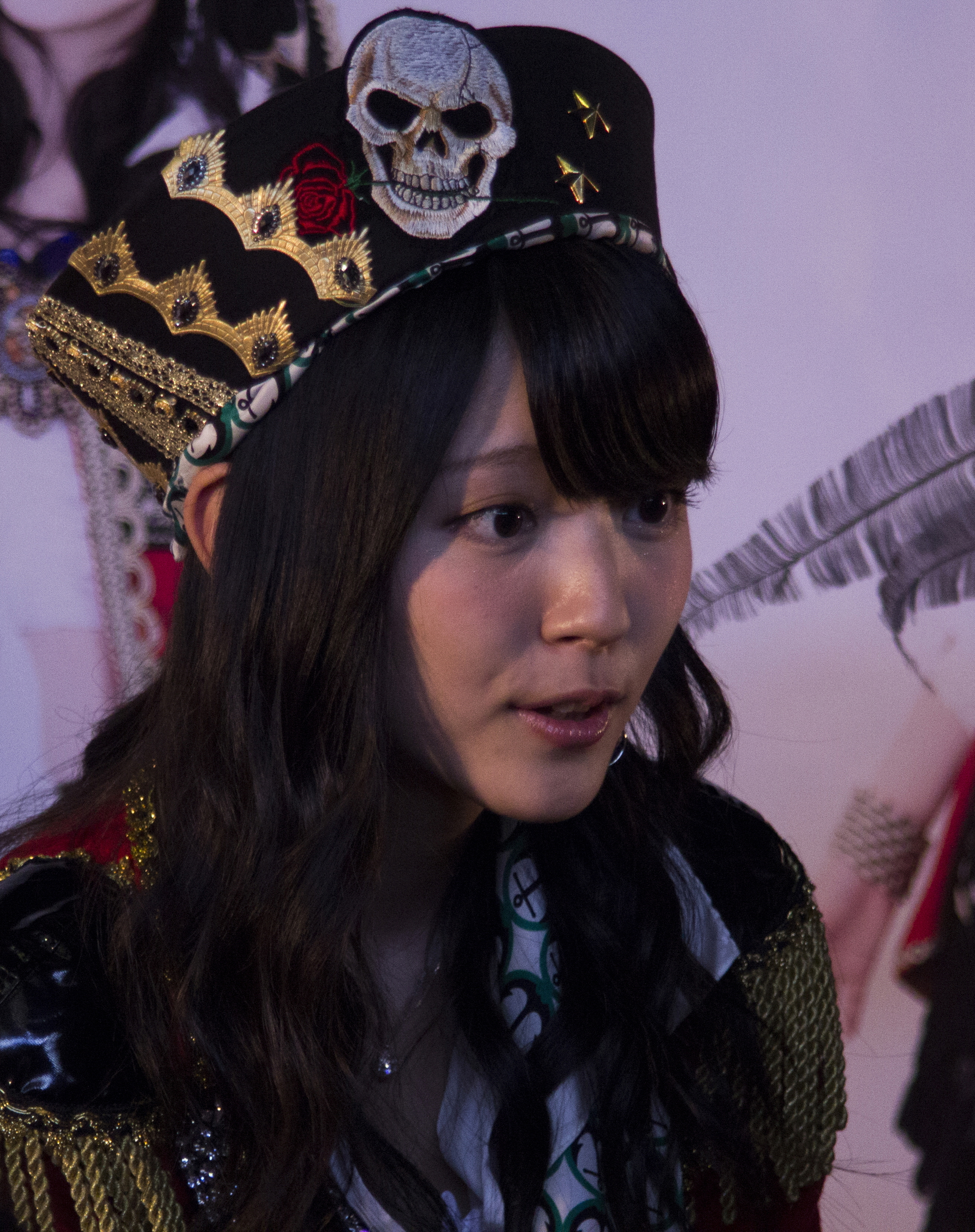
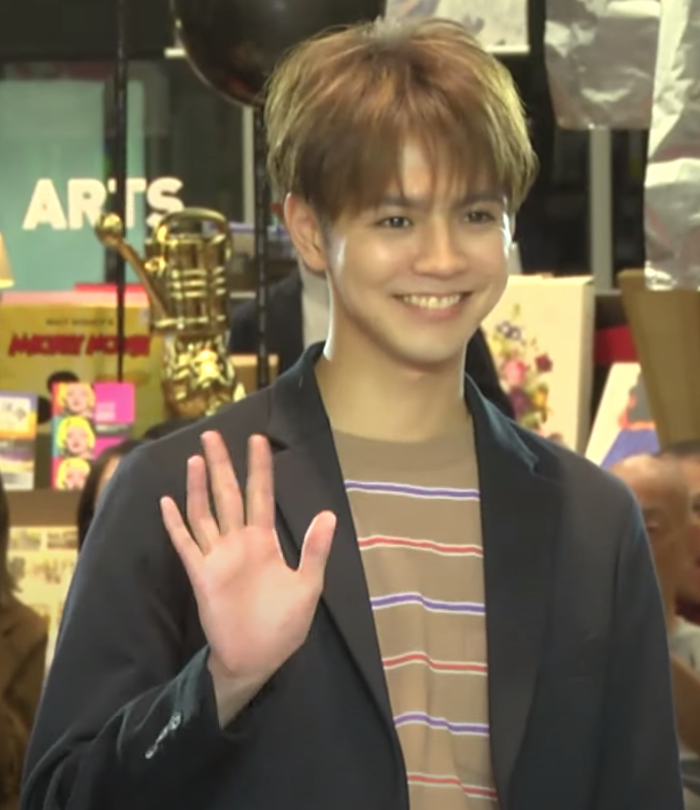
Airi Suzuki (left, pictured in 2013) starred in the live-action drama adaptations. Ryota Katayose (right, pictured in 2019) co-starred as Shuichi in the first season.

A live-action television drama adaptation of My Oshi Is Now My Boss was announced on August 25, 2023. The series is directed by Ryūichi Honda, Kōji Ono, and Yūya Matsushita. The script is written by Naomi Hiruta, Yūko Imanishi, Miho Aotsuka, Rie Izawa, and Junpei Yamaoka; Yuki Azuma, the writer of the original manga, wrote the script for episode 5. Produced by TV Tokyo and Axyz, the chief producer is Tatsuya Yamaga from TV Tokyo, with the other producers being Shōko Kawamura from TV Tokyo, Aya Oda from Axyz, and Yasutoshi Kigawa from Axyz. While searching for stories to adapt into a drama, Shōko Kawamura read My Oshi Is Now My Boss and decided to have the story adapted. Scat Gotō is in charge of the score.

The series stars Airi Suzuki as Hitomi and Generations from Exile Tribe member Ryota Katayose as Shuichi/Toma. Suzuki also plays an angel version of Hitomi, who acts as Hitomi's inner voice and imaginary alter-ego. While playing Hitomi, Suzuki referred to the disbandments of Cute and Buono!, the girl groups of which she had previously been a member of, and imagined how her fans had felt. Supporting cast members include Yuriyan Retriever, Akira Takano, Yūtarō Watanabe, Miki Inada from the comedy duo Benishōga, Karuma, Mei Fukuda, and Satoshi Tokushige. Additional guests appearing on the show consist of Keisuke Ueda, Akane Takayanagi, Akari Yoshida, Harumi Sato, and Haruka Kodama. Masayoshi Ōishi, 9taro Sueyoshi, and Bebechan also made appearances in the drama.

It premiered on U-Next on September 27, 2023, with one episode uploaded weekly. The television drama was also broadcast on TV Tokyo as part of their programming block Drama Next, as well as TV Osaka, TV Aichi, TV Setouchi, TV Hokkaido, and TVQ Kyushu Broadcasting, from October 5, 2023, (Note: TV Tokyo lists the broadcast date as October 4, 2023, at 24:30, which is October 5, 2023, at 12:30 a.m.) to December 21, 2023, with a total of 12 episodes. The opening theme song is "Dance the Life Away" by Ryota Katayose and the main theme song is "Saikyō no Oshi!" by Airi Suzuki, the latter of which was composed and written by Masayoshi Ōishi. The first season is licensed by Doki for online distribution with English subtitles.

On August 6, 2025, the live-action television drama was renewed for a second season, titled My Oshi Is Now My Boss: Full Throttle. Written with the permission from Azuma and Morinaga, the original creators, the second season takes place in an "alternate reality" separate from the original series and retains the main couple's relationship dynamic. Shōko Kawamura, the show's producer, stated that because Hitomi and Shuichi became a couple at the end of the series, the production staff explored different ways of what to do next and created multiple scenarios with input from Morinaga, Azuma, and Airi Suzuki, the actress of Hitomi, until finally settling on an original screenplay.

Suzuki returned to the lead role, playing a new female lead character named Ai Minami, the president's secretary at the apparel company Takashiro. Fantastics from Exile Tribe member Yusei Yagi was cast as Shun Himuro, Ai's favorite actor, whose real identity is Jun Takashiro and is forced to resign when the president of Takashiro falls ill, stepping into place as Ai's younger boss. The supporting cast consists of Cha Katō, Takayuki Hamatsu, Kanade from the comedy trio 3-ji no Heroine, Satoshi Mitsu, Airi Furuta, Yū Fukuzawa, Suga-chan the No. 1 Best from the comedy trio Party-chan, Michi, Yūtarō, Umi Shinonome, Girolamo Panzetta, Ikko, Kaoru Gotō, Manahiro Ishikawa, and Yūki Yoshioka. Kawamura also announced that several cast members of season 1 will be returning for Full Throttle, which were later revealed to be Akira Takano, Yuriyan Retriever, Masayoshi Ōishi, and 9taro Sueyoshi. Fantastics from Exile Tribe made a special guest appearance in episode 11.

Ryūichi Honda returned to direct, with Shinji Kuma and Eriko Satō as new directors for the season. The scriptwriters for Full Throttle consist of Yuki Azuma, Aya Watatane, Kumiko Asō, and Shōko Kawamura. Shūichirō Fukuhiro is in charge of the music. The opening theme song is "Reaching For Your Light" by Takanori Iwata from Sandaime J Soul Brothers and the main theme song is "Isshun Kimi Oshi" by Airi Suzuki, the latter of which was again composed and written by Masayoshi Ōishi. The series premiered on U-Next on October 1, 2025. It was broadcast on television from October 9, 2025, (Note: TV Tokyo lists the broadcast date as October 8, 2025, at 24:30, which is October 9, 2025, at 12:30 a.m.) to December 25, 2025, for 12 episodes.

==== Season 1 (2023) ====
No.	Title (Note: All titles are taken from TV Tokyo.)	Directed by	Written by	Original release date
1	"Untitled (Note: TV Tokyo did not list a title for episodes 1–4 of the first season.)"	Ryūichi Honda	Naomi Hiruta	October 5, 2023
2	"Untitled"	Ryūichi Honda	Yūko Imanishi	October 12, 2023
3	"Untitled"	Kōji Ono	Miho Aotsuka	October 19, 2023
4	"Untitled"	Ryūichi Honda	Miho Aotsuka	October 26, 2023
5	"The Midnight Stage... a Secret With a Kiss!"; Transliteration: "Mayonaka no Butai... Himitsu to Kisu!" (Japanese: 真夜中の舞台…秘密とキス！)	Ryūichi Honda	Yuki Azuma	November 2, 2023
6	"A Dangerous First Date!"; Transliteration: "Kiken na Hatsu Dēto!" (Japanese: 危険な初デート！)	Kōji Ono	Yūko Imanishi	November 9, 2023
7	"Shocking Photos! A Showdown Between Real Love and Women Who Do Oshikatsu"; Transliteration: "Shougeki Shashin! Riaru na Koi to Oshikatsu Joshi Taiketsu" (Japanese: 衝撃写真！リアルな恋と推し活女子対決)	Yūya Matsushita	Yūko Imanishi	November 16, 2023
8	"My Bias' New Lover Appears?!"; Transliteration: "Oshi no Shin Koibito Tōjō!?" (Japanese: 推しの新恋人登場!?)	Ryūichi Honda	Junpei Yamaoka	November 23, 2023
9	"The Girls Who Travel Around Their Bias and a Passionate Night"; Transliteration: "Oshi o Meguru Onna-tachi to Netsuai no Yoru" (Japanese: 推しをめぐる女たちと熱愛の夜)	Kōji Ono	Rie Izawa	November 30, 2023
10	"The BBQ Tournament of Love and My Bias's Surprise"; Transliteration: "Koi no BBQ Taikai to Oshi no Sapuraizu" (Japanese: 恋のBBQ大会と推しのサプライズ)	Ryūichi Honda	Junpei Yamaoka	December 7, 2023
11	"First Experience of Love: The Rival's Swaying Future"; Transliteration: "Koi no Hatsu Taiken: Raibaru no Yureru Mirai" (Japanese: 恋の初体験 ライバルに揺れる未来)	Ryūichi Honda	Rie Izawa	December 14, 2023
12	"Don't Disappear, Manager! The Conclusion of the Dream Love"; Transliteration: "Kienaide Buchō! Yumekoi no Ketsumatsu" (Japanese: 消えないで部長！夢恋の結末)	Ryūichi Honda	Junpei Yamaoka	December 21, 2023

==== Season 2: Full Throttle (2025) ====
No.	Title (Note: All titles are taken from U-Next.)	Directed by	Written by	Original release date
1	"An Unexpected Encounter Between the President's Secretary and Her Most Favorite Actor!"; Transliteration: "Shachō Hisho to Sai Oshi Haiyū no Masaka no Deai!" (Japanese: 社長秘書と最推し俳優のまさかの出会い！)	Ryūichi Honda	Shōko Kawamura	October 9, 2025
2	"She'd Love to! My First Time Being Her Bias's Assistant Means...?!"; Transliteration: "Yorokonde! Hajimete no Oshi no Tetsudai to wa...!?" (Japanese: 喜んで！初めての推しの手伝いとは…!?)	Ryūichi Honda	Aya Watatane	October 16, 2025
3	"Already Failed as a Secretary?! The Background Character Screwed Up Her President Bias's First Day at Work!"; Transliteration: "Mohaya Hisho Shikkaku!? Oshi Shachō no Hatsu Shukkin ni Mobu ga Yarakasu!" (Japanese: もはや秘書失格!? 推し社長の初出勤にモブがやらかす！)	Shinji Kuma	Aya Watatane	October 23, 2025
4	"Misfortune to Her Bias, One After Another...! The Background Character and Her Bias Get Closer in the Darkness of the Public Bathhouse!"; Transliteration: "Oshi ni Tsugitsugi to Saihan ga...! Sentou to Kurayami de Oshi to Mobu ga Daisekkin!" (Japanese: 推しに次々と災難が…！ 銭湯と暗闇で推しとモブが大接近！)	Ryūichi Honda	Kumiko Asō	October 30, 2025
5	"A Crisis and Thrill at Being Discovered She's His Fan! Her First Time Visiting Her Bias's House"; Transliteration: "Wota Bare no Kiki Ando Mune Kyun! Hajimete no Oshi Taku Hōmon" (Japanese: ヲタバレの危機&胸キュン！ 初めての推し宅訪問)	Eriko Satō	Yuki Azuma	November 6, 2025
6	"The Fated Party... The Background Character Suddenly Crosses Boundaries?!"; Transliteration: "Unmei no Pātī... Mobu ga Tsui ni Issen o Koeru!?" (Japanese: 運命のパーティー… モブがついに一線を越える!?)	Shinji Kuma	Yuki Azuma	November 13, 2025
7	"Reckless Heart in Love, Exposed Lies"; Transliteration: "Bōsō Suru Koigokoro, Abakareru Uso" (Japanese: 暴走する恋心、暴かれる嘘)	Ryūichi Honda	Shōko Kawamura	November 20, 2025
8	"The Background Character and Her Bias's Confession! A New Truth Becomes Clear!"; Transliteration: "Mobu to Oshi no Kokuhaku! Shin Jijitsu ga Akiraka ni!" (Japanese: モブと推しの告白！ 新事実が明らかに！)	Ryūichi Honda	Shōko Kawamura	November 27, 2025
9	"Her Bias Goes on Stage?! A Big Incident at Fantastics' Event"; Transliteration: "Oshi ga Sutēji ni!? Fantastics Ibento Dai Jiken" (Japanese: 推しがステージに!? FANTASTICSイベント大事件)	Ryūichi Honda	Rie Izawa	December 4, 2025
10	"A Rival in Love Appears! Her Bias Unexpectedly Gets Jealous?!"; Transliteration: "Koigataki Tōjō! Oshi ga Masaka no Shitto!?" (Japanese: 恋敵登場！推しがまさかの嫉妬!?)	Shinji Kuma	Junpei Yamaoka	December 11, 2025
11	"An Intense Love That Opposes the Two! The Final Chapter of the Dream Alternate Reality!"; Transliteration: "Futari o Habamu Kyōretsu na Ai! Yume no Sekaisen Saishūshō!" (Japanese: 二人を阻む強烈な愛！ 夢の世界線最終章！)	Ryūichi Honda	Shōko Kawamura	December 18, 2025
12	"The Secret Love Unexpectedly Overflows! The Conclusion to the Dream Love"; Transliteration: "Masaka no Himitsu to Ai ga Afuredasu! Yume no Koi no Ketsumatsu" (Japanese: まさかの秘密と愛が溢れ出す！ 夢の恋の結末)	Ryūichi Honda	Shōko Kawamura	December 25, 2025

== Reception ==
For the live-action television drama adaptation, Oricon noted that the first season was broadcast, its audience related to the show, particularly women. The first season was the 18th most viewed program on TVer between October and December of 2023, with 10,690,000 view counts. It was nominated at the 118th The Television Drama Academy Awards for the 2023 Fall season.
