= List of SSSS.Gridman episodes =

SSSS.Gridman
- No. of episodes: 12

Release
- Original network: Wowow, Tokyo MX, MBS, BS11
- Original release: October 7 – December 23, 2018

Season chronology
- Next → SSSS.Dynazenon

SSSS.Gridman is a 2018 anime television series co-produced by Tsuburaya Productions and Trigger. The series aired from October 7 to December 23, 2018. The series is directed by Akira Amemiya, written by Keiichi Hasegawa, and animated by Trigger. Masayuki Gotou designed Gridman with Masaru Sakamoto handling the other character designs, many of which are directly inspired by characters from the Transformers franchise. Shirō Sagisu composes the music. The opening theme is "UNION" by OxT, and the ending theme is "youthful beautiful" by Maaya Uchida. During their Anime Expo 2018 panel, Funimation announced they licensed the series for streaming on FunimationNow and an English dub. The anime was also licensed by Funimation in the United Kingdom, Ireland, South Africa, Australia, New Zealand, Denmark, Iceland, Norway and Sweden. The anime was simulcast by Crunchyroll in those countries.

On December 14, 2019, a sequel series, SSSS.Dynazenon, was announced at Tsuburaya Production's own convention, Tsubucon. The animation project is a continuation of SSSS.Gridman set in the same shared "Gridman Universe".

On November 15, 2020, it was announced during an Adult Swim YouTube livestream panel that the anime's English dub would premiere on the network's Toonami programming block on January 17, 2021.

== Episode list ==
No.	Title (Note: All English titles are taken from Crunchyroll.)	Storyboard by (Note: Information is taken from the ending credits of each episode.)	Directed by	Written by	Original release date (Note: Wowow lists the series as premiering at 24:00 on Saturday, which is effectively Sunday at 12:00 a.m. JST.)	English air date (Note: Adult Swim lists the series as premiering at 2:30 a.m. (26:30) ET/PT on Saturday, which is effectively Sunday.)
1	"Awakening"; Transliteration: "Kaku-sei" (Japanese: 覚・醒)	Akira Amemiya	Yoshihiro Miyajima	Keiichi Hasegawa	October 7, 2018	January 17, 2021
A young boy named Yuta Hibiki awakens in the home of his classmate, Rikka Takarada, with no memory of his past and sees hallucinations of a robot named Gridman in an old computer terminal in Takarada's family store. The next day, Yuta meets his friend, Sho Utsumi, who helps him cope with his amnesia. Intrigued by Yuta's story about Gridman, Utsumi asks Yuta to show him the terminal (which he nicknames "Junk"), and they run into Rikka along the way. A kaiju then abruptly appears and begins attacking the city, destroying the school while some students were there. Yuta is sucked into the terminal and reappears as Gridman to battle the Kaiju, defeating the monster with help from Utsumi and Rikka. But Gridman warns them that there will be more kaiju to come. Next day, Yuta and his friends are shocked to see that their school had somehow been completely rebuilt.
2	"Restoration"; Transliteration: "Shū-fuku" (Japanese: 修・復)	Akira Amemiya	Masato Nakasono	Keiichi Hasegawa	October 14, 2018	January 24, 2021
Yuta and his friends discover that, in addition to all the damage being undone, nobody remembers the kaiju attack or of those killed during the attack. Following their investigation and reason that only they remember, they are approached by a mysterious man named Samurai Calibur who "optimizes" Junk so Rikka and Utsumi can interact with Gridman. They continue to investigate the missing students and learn that everybody's memories have been rewritten to believe they had all died before reaching high-school. Meanwhile, Yuta's classmate, Akane Shinjō, is revealed to responsible for the Kaiju attack through the aid of her mysterious benefactor Alexis Kerib, having used the Kaiju, Ghoulghilas, to kill the students for ruining her lunch. She proceeds to create Dévadadan to target her homeroom teacher for not apologizing after bumping into her. Yuta once again fuses with Gridman to fight the Kaiju, but finds himself outmatched. This prompts Caliber to leap into Junk, transforming into a sword that Gridman uses to destroy the kaiju. The homeroom teacher survives the kaiju attack with the damage and everybody's memories reset soon after.
3	"Defeat"; Transliteration: "Hai-boku" (Japanese: 敗・北)	Hisaaki Okui (Note: Credited under the pen name "Ikuo Geso" (げそ いくお, Geso Ikuo).)	Hiroyuki Takashima	Keiichi Hasegawa	October 21, 2018	January 31, 2021
Akane creates a new Kaiju named Anti, who is intelligent and can take human form, and has him attack the city to draw Gridman out. Yuta fuses with Gridman, but is defeated even with Calibur's assistance, with the day resetting. Afterwards, Yuta does not reappear, leading Rikka and Utsumi to fear that he is dead, but they are too afraid to try to contact him to confirm it. While Akane celebrates her apparent victory, three strangers arrive at the shop looking for Calibur and Gridman, and point out the hypocrisy of Rikka and Utsumi refusing to contact Yuta if they are so concerned. Rikka then finally works up the courage to call Yuta and it is revealed that he, Calibur, and Gridman were just in hiding in hopes of ambushing Anti. Gridman then appears and successfully draws Anti out. One of the strangers, named Max, enters Junk and combines with Gridman to form Max Gridman. Max Gridman and Anti then fight to a draw, with both running out of energy. Afterwards, Gridman introduces Calibur and his comrades as his allies, the Neon Genesis Junior High Students, while Akane rejects Anti for his failure.
4	"Suspicion"; Transliteration: "Gi-shin" (Japanese: 疑・心)	Tatsumi Fujii	Tatsumi Fujii	Keiichi Hasegawa	October 28, 2018	February 7, 2021
Akane suspects Gridman to be Yuta, but has no proof, so she approaches Rikka. When Rikka's friends convince her to come with them on a group outing with Arcadia, a four-man Internet personality group, Akane tags along. But the trip proves to be a waste of time, with Akane creating a Kaiju to kill Arcadia after Anti refuses since his sole purpose is to defeat Gridman. Meanwhile, Yuta is concerned by Rikka hanging out with other boys, causing him to realize he has a crush on her. The next day, Rikka notices three Arcadia members have been killed by a kaiju, and attempts to warn the last member as the kaiju attacks. Gridman appears to battle it, but Anti appears as well, turning it into a three-way-battle. The entire NGJHS try transforming at once, but Junk is unable to handle the strain. Thus, they decide to stick to one combination and use Max Gridman to defeat the kaiju, while Anti runs out of energy again. Next day, Rikka wonders if she is the cause of the Kaiju attacks, since they always seem to appear near her.
5	"Provocation"; Transliteration: "Chō-hatsu" (Japanese: 挑・発)	Hiroyuki Ōshima	Yoshiyuki Kaneko	Keiichi Hasegawa	November 4, 2018	February 14, 2021
Yuta and his class go on a field trip into the mountains. During the trip, Akane questions Yuta about his amnesia and tricks him into admitting he is Gridman. She then summons a massive mountain-sized kaiju she created prior to draw Gridman out, but Yuta cannot transform as he has no access to Junk. The Gridman Alliance manage to contact the NGJHS, who purchase Junk from Rikka's mother and reach Yuta's location to allow him to become Gridman. Anti also appears, but the NGJHS member Borr combines with Gridman to form Buster Gridman and overwhelms the kaiju with sheer firewpower, causing Anti to be buried beneath the rubble. Afterwards, Yuta and his class return home, with Max realizing kaiju always seem to be appear in proximity of Yuta's class. After they leave, the mountainside suddenly breaks apart.
6	"Contact"; Transliteration: "Ses-shoku" (Japanese: 接・触)	Yoshihiro Miyajima	Yoshihiro Miyajima	Keiichi Hasegawa	November 11, 2018	February 21, 2021
Confident that Yuta is Gridman, Akane orders Anti to kill him, but Anti begins succumbing to hunger during his search due to Akane having not fed him. He's soon found by Rikka, who feeds and bathes him before he runs off. Meanwhile, Akane approaches Utsumi and attempts to extract more information from him, but he reveals nothing. As these events occur, Yuta meets a human-like Kaiju named Anosillus the 2nd who takes him on a train ride to show him an obliterated wasteland pass the outskirts. Anosillus explains that the city is Akane's creation, along with the Kaiju she uses to perpetually destroy unwanted elements and repair the city without anyone knowing. She also warns him that Akane is being manipulated before leaving. Yuta is attacked by Anti on the way home, but Max and Calibur interfere and convince Anti to leave by pointing out that he will never properly battle with Gridman if he kills Yuta. Yuta then goes to the shop to report to Gridman, and finds his friends waiting for him.
7	"Scheme"; Transliteration: "Saku-ryaku" (Japanese: 策・略)	Ken Ōtsuka	Masato Nakasono	Keiichi Hasegawa	November 18, 2018	February 28, 2021
Yuta tells Rikka and Utsumi what he learned, but they are skeptical. He then returns home to find Akane waiting for him, declaring herself a god while trying to convince him to join her side. Akane proceeds to treat Yuta to dinner, revealing her petty reasons for having her Kaiju kill people who offend her. Alexis then arrives and introduces himself to Yuta as the one who brings Akane's kaiju to life. Just then a kaiju suddenly appears with Yuta leaving to fight it. A confused Akane learns that the Kaiju was Anti's own creation that Alexis brought to life to draw out Gridman. Meanwhile, the NGJHS member Vit combines with Gridman to form Sky Gridman and take on both Anti and his kaiju. The battle takes them high into the sky, where they discover an alien landscape hovering above. Gridman defeats Anti and the kaiju, but Yuta and his friends are troubled by these new developments. Afterwards, Alexis convinces an angry Akane to let him "discipline" Anti, grievously wounding his face during a confrontation in a back alley.
8	"Confrontation"; Transliteration: "Tai-ritsu" (Japanese: 対・立)	Yoshitada Kuba	Hiroyuki Takashima	Keiichi Hasegawa	November 25, 2018	March 7, 2021
Akane announces to Yuta and his friends that she will launch a kaiju attack during the upcoming school festival, showing them the Mecha Ghoulghilas model she made. While Yuta and Utsumi make a counter-strategy, the latter gets into argument with Rikka when she suggests reasoning with Akane. Ultimately, Yuta and Utsumi try Rikka's method and attempt to convince Akane not to target the festival, but she ignores them. Rikka also fails to stop Akane, who reveals that even the city residents are her creations, and that she specifically was created to be Akane's friend. Meanwhile, an injured and starving Anti arrives at the shop for Rikka's aid, and the NGJHS feed him in return for his contact info. Rikka tells Yuta she wants to apologize to Utsumi, intending to do so before he can apologize to her. This gives Yuta the idea to have Gridman appear at the festival before the kaiju, forcing an evacuation. By reducing Gridman's size, the entire NGJHS is able to transform and combine to form Full Powered Gridman. They then defeat the kaiju, allowing the festival to continue after the day resets. Afterwards, Rikka and Utsumi make up, while Akane is depressed over her own inability to defeat Gridman.
9	"Dream"; Transliteration: "Mu-sō" (Japanese: 夢・想)	Kai Ikarashi	Yoshiyuki Kaneko	Keiichi Hasegawa	December 2, 2018	March 14, 2021
Yuta finds himself reliving the events of the first episode with Akane having taken Rikka's place. Similarly, Rikka relives her first meeting with Akane, and Utsumi lives a scenario where he and Akane became friends. In reality, Akane trapped them in different dreamworlds using a kaiju she created in an attempt to win them over. But they eventually realize what is going on and decide to return to their reality, despite Akane begging them to remain in the dream. Gridman then materializes in the dreamworld and attacks the kaiju there, causing it to materialize in the real world. The NGJHS, who were watching over the sleeping trio at the shop, all transform and combine to form Powered Zenon, defeating the kaiju on their own. Anti then angrily calls Calibur and asks why Gridman will not appear, and he replies that Gridman will not fight him as he is a living being with a heart. Afterwards, Yuta, Rikka, and Utsumi awaken with the resolve to save Akane from the confines of her own dream. Meanwhile, a rejected Akane slips further into depression.
10	"Collapse"; Transliteration: "Hō-kai" (Japanese: 崩・壊)	Hideyuki Satake	Hideyuki Satake	Keiichi Hasegawa	December 9, 2018	March 21, 2021
Yuta, Rikka, Utsumi, and the NGJHS reach Akane's house to confront her, only to find an alien landscape inside. As they wait for her next move, Calibur confronts Anti and tries to convince him to find a new purpose. Soon after, at Alexis's hounding, a depressed Akane creates a seemingly weak kaiju that Full Powered Gridman easily defeats. Anti then tries to fight them, but runs out of energy again with Gridman still refusing to kill him. Mysteriously, the day does not reset and the kaiju's corpse remains. Akane rejects Anti's attempts to comfort her as he is no longer a kaiju anymore, while a new kaiju emerges from the first one and destroys the kaiju that maintain the city. An embodiment of Akane's madness, Anonymous, nearly kills Gridman when Anti intervenes and kills it, after his newfound resolve turns his kaiju form into a copy of Gridman that the others christen Gridknight. Afterwards, Akane, who witnessed Yuta's transformation, confronts everyone at the shop. The others try to tell her that Alexis is manipulating her, when she suddenly stabs Yuta with a box cutter.
11	"Decisive Battle"; Transliteration: "Kes-sen" (Japanese: 決・戦)	Masato Nakasono	Masato Nakasono	Keiichi Hasegawa	December 16, 2018	March 28, 2021
As Yuta falls into a coma after being stabbed while a distraught Akane tears Junk down, the city falls into chaos without its Kaiju custodians. Matters worsen when Alexis recreates Akane's previous Kaiju creations as she is too depressed to make new ones, with Gridknight holding them off while the NGJHS repair Junk upon realizing it and Yuta are linked. They complete the repairs as Yuta awakens, having realized he is actually Gridman possessing the real Yuta's body. He then takes off despite Utsumi's protests of further endangering Yuta's body to stop Alexis. He, Max, Bor, and Vit transform into Full Powered Gridman, while Calibur partners with Gridknight to form Gridknight Calibur, and together they defeat the kaiju army. Meanwhile, Rikka confronts Akane and declares them friends despite Akane's attempts to push her away. However, Alexis reappears and transforms Akane into a kaiju.
12	"Awakening"; Transliteration: "Kakusei" (Japanese: 覚醒)	Akira Amemiya Shūhei Handa	Yoshihiro Miyajima	Keiichi Hasegawa	December 23, 2018	April 4, 2021
Alexis turns Akane into the core of the kaiju Zegga, haunted by visions of her victims as Zegga rampages throughout the city. While Gridman, in Yuta's body, goes to collect Rikka and Utsumi, Anti subdues the kaiju as Gridknight and extracts Akane, only to be mortally wounded by Alexis. Alexis then absorbs Akane and becomes a kaiju himself. Back at the shop, Rikka and Utsumi figure out Junk's access code, allowing Gridman, the NGJHS, and Anti to all combine into Gridman's true form. Gridman fights Alexis in what turns into a losing battle as Alexis can revive himself while revealing that he has been exploiting Akane from the very beginning so he can feed on her negative emotions. But Gridman uses his true power, Grid Fixer Beam, to reset the city while reaching Akane as he, Rikka, and Utsumi convince her to face her fears. This weakens Alexis enough for Gridman to defeat him. In the aftermath, Akane bids a tearful goodbye to Rikka and returns to her world while Gridman and the NGJHS take the captive Alexis to the Hyper World, leaving Yuta's body and Anti behind. The city returns to normal as the real Yuta wakes up in the company of Rikka and Utsumi, while Anti finds himself being nursed back to health by Anosillus the 2nd and Akane waking up in the real world, setting the events of the epilogue in the music video of the anime's opening theme song, "UNION" by OxT.
