= Andrea Brenta =

Italian Renaissance humanist, professor and Greek–Latin translator

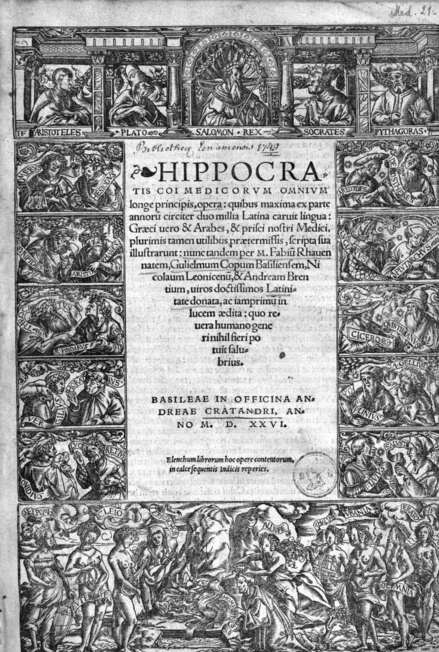
A 1526 edition of Hippocrates containing some of Brenta's translations

Andrea Brenta (c. 1454 – 11 February 1484), also known as Andreas Brentius, was an Italian Renaissance humanist, professor and Greek–Latin translator.

== Life ==
Brenta was born in Padua around 1454. He attended the lectures of Demetrios Chalkokondyles in 1463. He also credits Theodorus Gaza as one of his teachers. He joined Cardinal Oliviero Carafa as a secretary and was living in Rome by 1475. He taught Greek and Latin at the University of Rome. He came to hold a highly negative opinion of the schools, regarding them as breeding grounds of ignorance and arrogance.

In 1476, Brenta accompanied Oliviero Carafa to Naples to attend the coronation of Beatrice of Naples and to escape an outbreak of plague in Rome. The earliest surviving register of the Vatican Library—which was open to the public at the time—shows that Brenta borrowed the Anabasis on 10 October 1477 and a copy of Hippocrates on 21 June 1479. At Pentecost on 18 May 1483, he gave a public sermon in the presence of Pope Sixtus IV in Saint Peter's Basilica on the nature of the Holy Spirit.

Brenta died from the plague on 11 February 1484, the date and cause of death being known from a letter of his colleague Bartolomeo della Fonte to Giovanni Acciauoli. At his funeral, the eulogy was delivered by Paolo Marsi. It was recorded by Paolo Cortesi. Several others wrote poems lamenting his early death, including Scipione Forteguerri and Francesco Matarazzo.

== Works ==
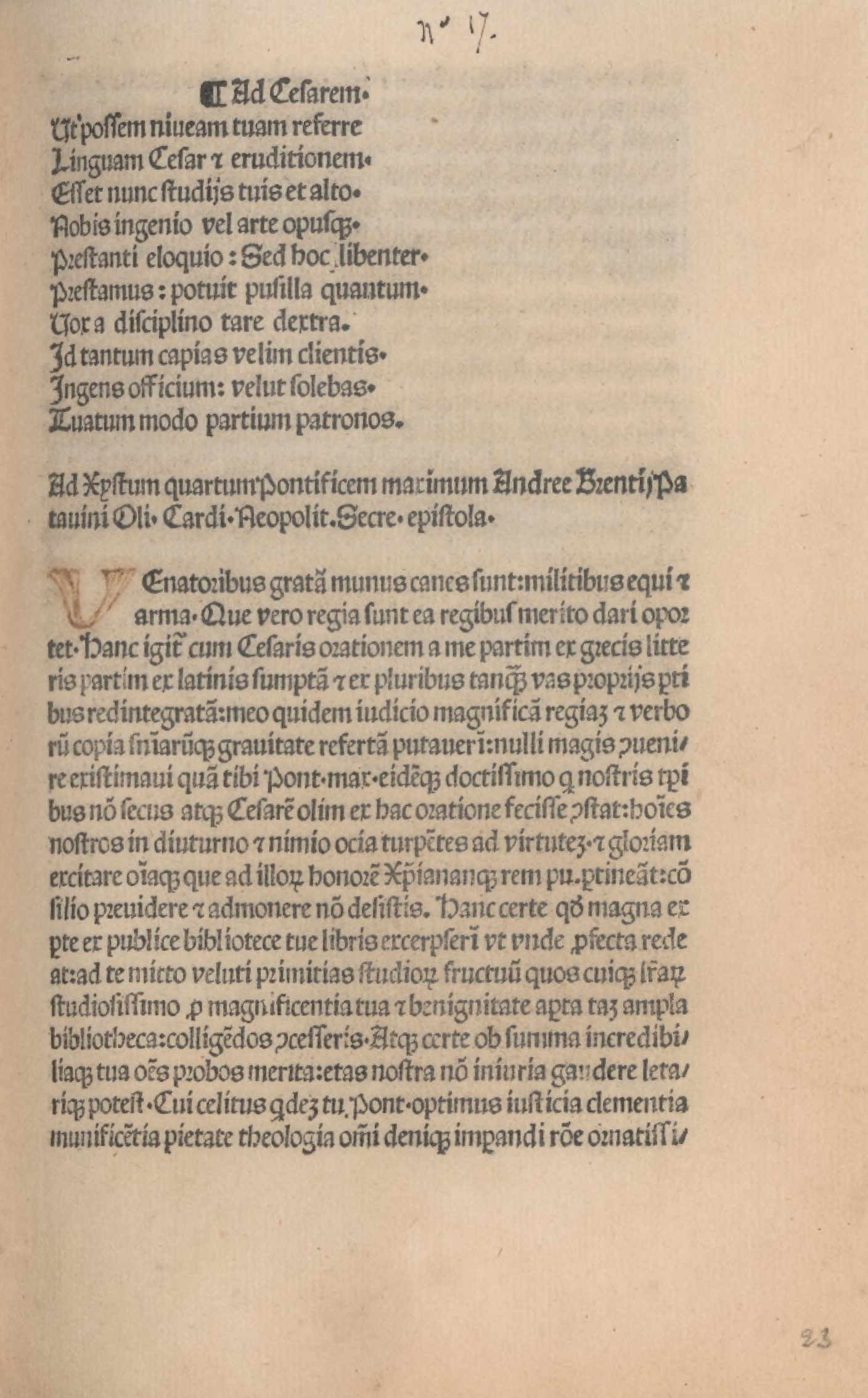
First page of the Plannck edition of Caesaris oratio Vesontione habita

The inaugural lectures of three courses taught by Brenta are preserved:

- In disciplinas et bonas artes oratio Romae initio gymnasii habita, an introduction to the trivium and quadrivium, including praise of Pope Sixtus for his patronage of the Roman gymnasia
- In principio lectionis Aristophanis praeludia, an introduction to Aristophanes
- In historiam Caesaremque Caesarisque Commentarios, a lecture on Julius Caesar's Commentarii de Bello Gallico, probably delivered around 1480

Brenta wrote a short piece in praise of Oliviero Carafa, Oratio in convivii laudem habita apud Cardinalem Oliverium Neapolitanum, dedicated to Carafa's nephew, Alessandro Carafa. He predicted that Carafa would one day be pope.

Brenta was prolific as a translator of Greek works into Latin. Shortly after 1475, he published a Latin translation Caesar's speech in Vesontio from Dio Cassius, based on a manuscript belonging to Sixtus IV, to whom the translation was dedicated. His is a composite text, pieced together from Dio, Caesar's Commentarii and other Greek sources. Entitled Caesaris oratio Vesontione habita, this work was printed at Rome first by Bartholomaeus Guldinbeck in 1481 and then a second time by Stephan Plannck before 1484.

Brenta's translation of the De regno of Dio Chrysostom was also dedicated to Sixtus. During his time in Naples, Brenta completed translations of the Oratio funebris of Lysias and John Chrysostom's sermon In proditionem Iudae, both dedicated to Oliviero Carafa. He also translated several works from the Hippocratic corpus, including:

- De victu
- De tuenda valetudine
- Lex medicine
- Iusiurandum
- Invectiva in obtrectatores medicinae
- De insomniis
- De natura hominis
- De arte
- De locis in homine
- Demonstratio quod artes sunt
- De diaeta acutorum
- De salubri victus ratione

De insomniis, translated in 1479–1480, survives in both a manuscript presentation copy for Sixtus IV and a printed edition by Oliviero Servio (1490). It has a dual dedication to Sixtus and Nicola Gupalatino and a prefatory letter addressed to Zaccaria Barbaro.

The Roman printer Eucharius Silber published Brenta's 1483 sermon, Oratio in die Pentecostes (caption title: In Pentecosten oratio).

== Bibliography ==
- Norman, Diana (1989). The Patronage of Cardinal Oliviero Carafa, 1430–1511 (PhD thesis). The Open University.
- Miglio, Massimo [in Italian] (1972). "Brenta, Andrea". Dizionario Biografico degli Italiani (in Italian). Vol. 14: Branchi–Buffetti. Rome: Istituto dell'Enciclopedia Italiana. ISBN 978-88-12-00032-6.
- Masson, Irvine (1936). "The Bibliography of a Small Incunable". The Library. 4th ser. 17 (1): 36–61. doi:10.1093/library/s4-xvii.1.36.
- Thorndike, Lynn (1934). A History of Magic and Experimental Science During the First Thirteen Centuries of Our Era. Vol. 4. Columbia University Press.
