= Marsi (disambiguation) =

Marsi is a tribe of ancient Italy.

Marsi may also refer to:

- Marsi (Germanic), a tribe of ancient Germany
- Counts of Marsi, counts in Southern Italy from the 11th and 12th centuries AD
- Bishop of Marsi of the Diocese of Marsi, a former central Italian Roman Catholic bishopric
- Marsi Gallery, a gallery in Thailand

== Surname ==
- Francesca Marsi (1926-1989), Italian actress
- Márk Marsi (born 1973), Hungarian fencer
- Paolo Marsi (1440-1481), Italian humanist

== Given name ==
- Marsi Paribatra (1931-2013), Thai princess

== See also ==
- Mars I, the innermost moon of Mars
- Mars 1 (disambiguation)
- Marcy (disambiguation)
