= Marcy-sous-Marle =

- Commune
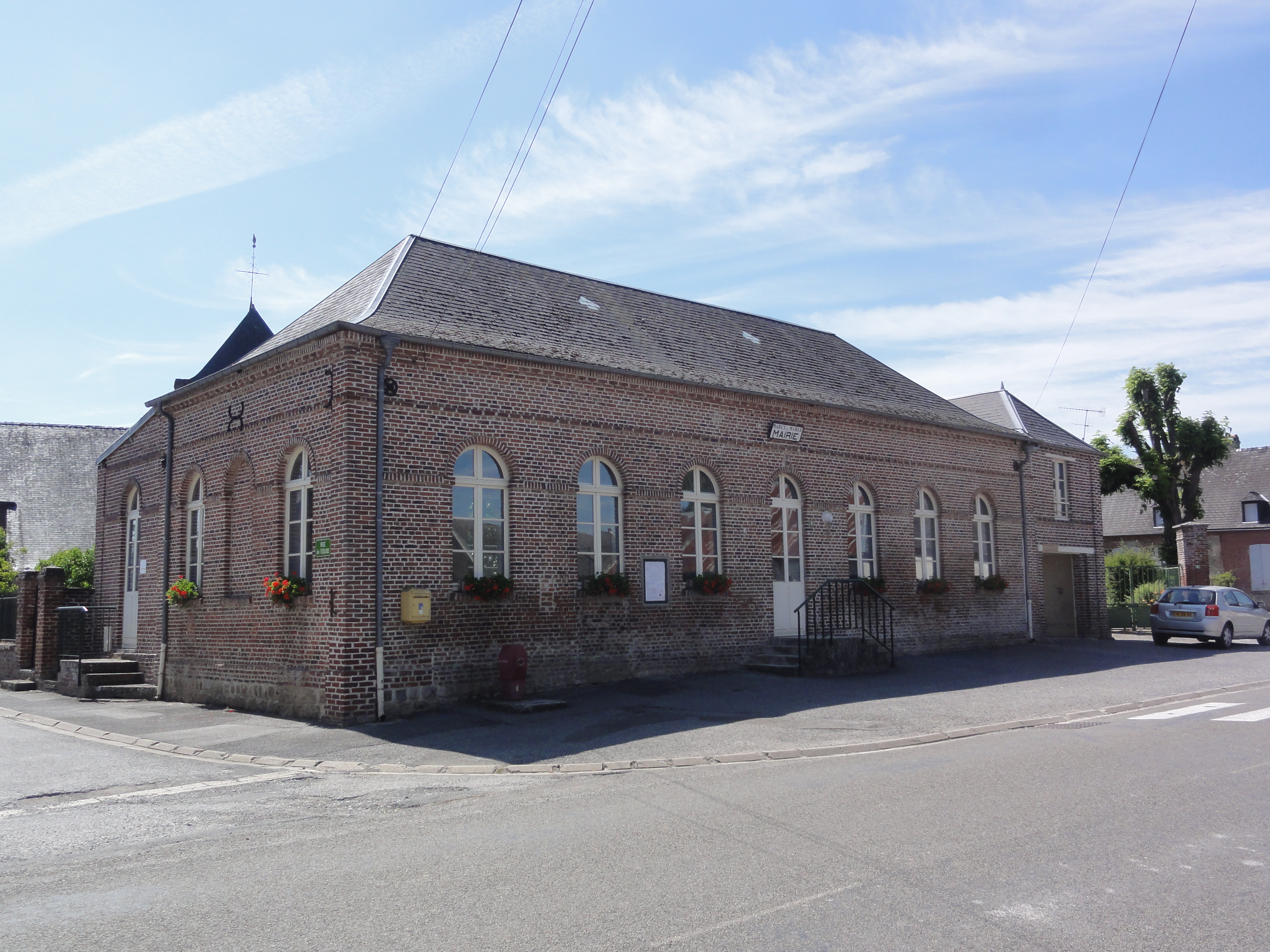
- The town hall of Marcy-sous-Marle
- Location of Marcy-sous-Marle
- Location within France Location within Hauts-de-France
- Coordinates: 49°44′N 3°44′E
- Country: France
- Region: Hauts-de-France
- Department: Aisne
- Arrondissement: Laon
- Canton: Marle
- Intercommunality: Pays de la Serre

Government
  - Mayor (2026–32): Christian Blain
- Area^{1}: 4.39 km^{2} (1.69 sq mi)
- Elevation: 77 m (253 ft)
- Highest elevation: 126 m (413 ft)
- Lowest elevation: 72 m (236 ft)
- Population (2023): 203
  - Density: 46.2/km^{2} (120/sq mi)
- Time zone: UTC+01:00 (CET)
  - Summer (DST): UTC+02:00 (CEST)
- INSEE/Postal code: 02460 /02250
- ^{1} French Land Register data, which excludes lakes, ponds, glaciers > 1 km^{2} (0.386 sq mi or 247 acres) and river estuaries.

Marcy-sous-Marle (French pronunciation: [maʁsi su maʁl], literally Marcy under Marle) is a commune in the Aisne department in Hauts-de-France in northern France.

== Population ==
Historical population
Year	Pop.	±% p.a.
1968	261	—
1975	238	−1.31%
1982	265	+1.55%
1990	235	−1.49%
1999	233	−0.09%
2007	207	−1.47%
2012	219	+1.13%
2017	192	−2.60%
2023	203	+0.93%
Source: INSEE

== See also ==
- Communes of the Aisne department
