= Florent Marcie =

French film director

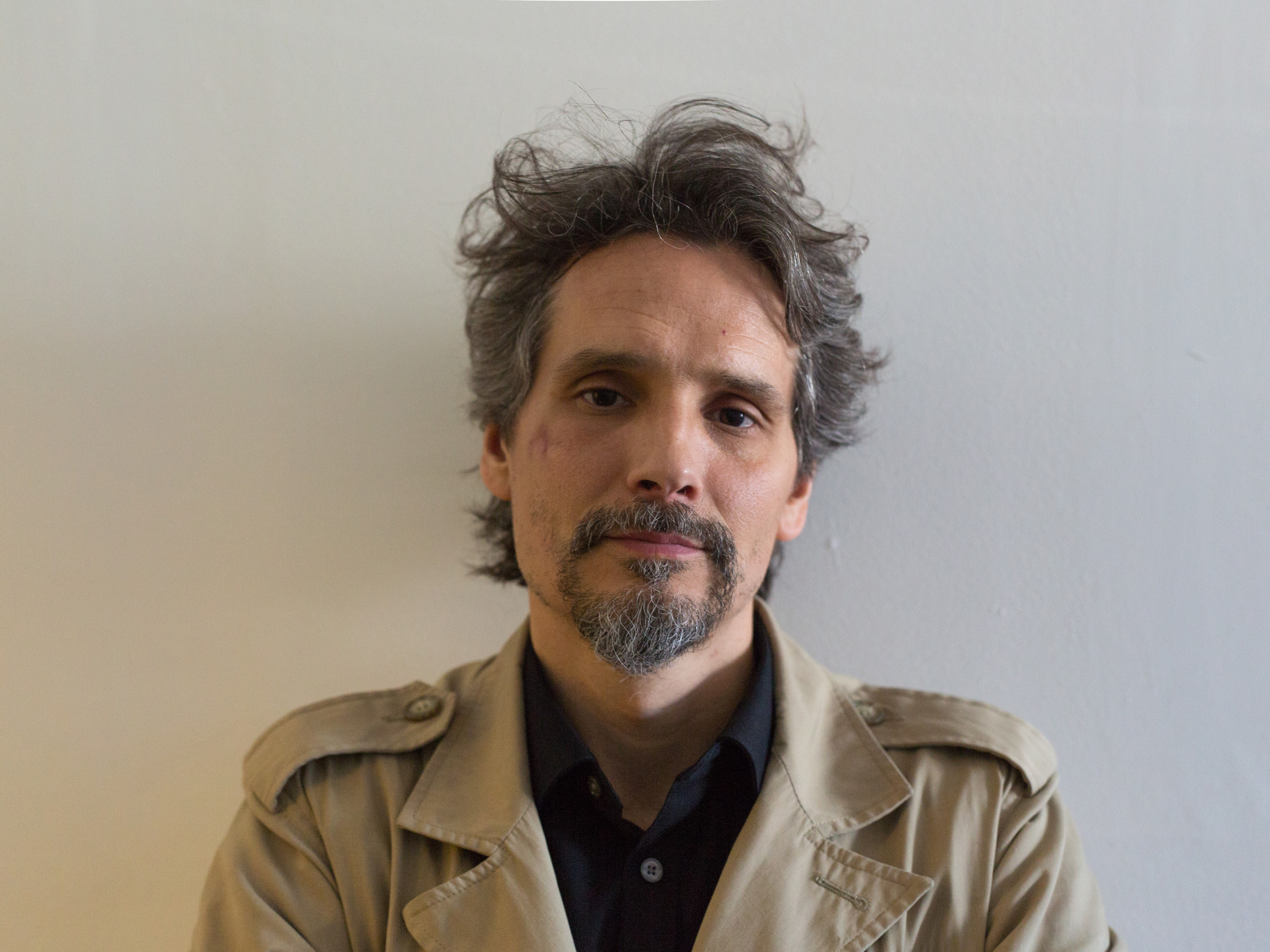
- Born: Florent Marcie; 1968 (age 57–58)
- Occupations: Filmmaker, war reporter, journalist
- Years active: 1989-
- Notable work: Itchkéri Kenti, le peuple d'Itchkérie (Itchkeri Kenti, people of Ichkeria), Tomorrow Tripoli, la révolution des rats (Tomorrow Tripoli, The Revolution of the Rats), 'A.I. AT WAR"

Florent Marcie (born 1968) is a French documentary filmmaker, a war reporter and journalist.

Both producer and director of his own works, his most notable films are Itchéri Kenti, a portrait of Chechen rebels during the 1996 war in Chechnya and Tomorrow Tripoli, a documentary film shot in the heart of the Libyan revolution. His main focus is on how mankind behaves in wartime, the challenges of information in our societies and the prospects for revolutions in the post-Cold War world.

== Biography ==
Florent Marcie began photography in December 1989, during the Romanian revolution. He occasionally collaborates with the written press and institutional media. He is a member of the WARM Foundation.

=== First filmmaking activities ===
Florent Marcie made his first documentary, La tribu du tunnel (The Tunnel Tribe) in 1995 in the disused streets of the Petite Ceinture in the 13th arrondissement of Paris. The film was selected at the Documentary Film Festival of Lussas and was broadcast on French TV Canal+ and France 2, in French-speaking Switzerland on TSR and in Canada on SRC. In 1997, he produced the documentary Diary of a Sicilian Rebel (Diario di una siciliana ribelle) made by Italian filmmaker Marco Amenta. The movie was selected in the official competition of the 54th Venice Film Festival.

After these two experiences for television, Florent Marcie decided to produce, shoot and edit his films himself. He founded his company No Man's Land. His first feature film Sous les arbres d'Ajiep (Under the trees of Ajiep) is dedicated to the famine that ravaged Sudan in 1998. The film was nominated in official selection at the Cinéma du réel International Documentary Festival at the Centre Pompidou in Paris.

He also contributed to the making-of the film Le Peuple Migrateur (Winged Migration) directed by French director Jacques Perrin in 2001.

=== Freelance journalist and documentary filmmaking in Afghanistan ===
In 1999, Florent Marcie published an extensive report in the French newspaper Le Monde about Taliban exactions in the Shamaly Plain during the Afghan War (1996–2001). The journalist revealed that "in addition to the strictly military objectives of the Taliban, there is now a desire for large-scale displacement of populations, massacres and systematic destruction". In the aftermath of the September 11 attacks in 2001, Florent Marcie exhumed his footage shot in Afghanistan and edited two TV news reports for the show Envoyé spécial on French television France 2. The first, aired on September 13, 2001, revealed the Taliban's plans for attacks in the West, held in the jails of Commander Ahmed Shah Massoud's army. It is broadcast worldwide, most notably in the United States on NBC and in Japan on NHK. The report is chosen as part of the best-of made for the twenty years of Envoyé Spécial in 2010. The second story, aired on October 4, highlights his investigation about ethnic cleansing in Shamaly province.

At the same time, his short experimental film Saïa (Afghanistan, 2000), highlighted by Le Monde critic Jean-Michel Frodon, was screened at the Museum of Modern Art in New York (MOMA). In 2015 Florent Marcie completed the editing of Commandant Khawani, a feature film portraying a young commander on the front line of Bagram in Afghanistan in the 2000s.

One of his portraits of Commander Massoud inspired a series of stamps issued by the French and Afghan postal services.

=== Critical recognition with Itchkéri Kenti ===
In 1996, Florent Marcie went to Chechnya and filmed the war on the rebel side. Captured for three days by the Russian special forces and the FSB, he recounts in a long article for Paris Match in May 1996 " hours of interrogations, violence, threats, torture...and the obligation to drink vodka at gunpoint ". Ten years later, his second feature-length documentary, Itchkéri Kenti, les fils d'Itchkérie (Itchkeri Kenti, people of Itchkeria), was released in France by MK2 Distribution company on 7 February 2007. The film was also selected at the ACID, the parallel section of the Cannes Film Festival. The movie is a portrait of the Chechen people during the Chechen War of 1996. The film was critically acclaimed, praising both the visual qualities and the historical interest of the film. It was rated 3.9/5 stars by ten press critics on Allociné. The French critic Cécile Mury in Télérama sums up the film, a "long and lively travel diary", in these words:

"During the winter of 1996, the filmmaker and journalist Florent Marcie, equipped with an amateur camcorder and two photographic cameras, criss-crossed this small country at war with the Russian giant. Ten years later, while Chechnya remains the most heavily mined country in the world, and the fighting has resumed with renewed vigour, he decided to show this film, which is strikingly immersed in the heart of one of the greatest contemporary tragedies (in ten years, more than 200,000 dead, as many exiles...)."

French newspaper Le Monde hails "a fascinating film" and a "war film apart" in which "the spectacle and the movement disappear to give way to the inglorious horror of fear and expectation." For the French critics magazine Les Cahiers du cinéma, "Itchkéri Kenti gives off (...) much more than the staging of the umpteenth Euro-political impasse (...) It is the beauty and the richness of a country that finds its truth closest to the collective experience of a liberation struggle. ". The critic and former editor-in-chief of the Cahiers du cinéma Jean-Michel Frodon considers Florent Marcie to be one of the representatives of the new generation of French documentary.

=== The Libyan Revolution: Tomorrow Tripoli (2011-2015) ===
In February 2011, Florent Marcie travels to Libya to record the Libyan Revolution of 2011. He spent eight months alongside the Libyan revolutionaries. The film Tomorrow Tripoli tells the story of the Libyan revolution in the small town of Zintan until the fall of Gaddafi. The filmmaker also contributed to cover the conflict for the national and international press with written articles for Le Monde, television reports and interviews for France 24 and several photographs for Agence France-Presse (published in the French and international press). During the film's premiere in Sarajevo, 150 ex-revolutionaries chartered a plane from Tripoli to attend.

In 2015, the film was presented at a retrospective entitled "War Paintings" (Peintures de guerre) held at the Cinémathèque française as part of the "Avant-Garde Cinema" programme designed by researcher and curator Nicole Brenez. On this occasion, Agence France-Presse highlighted "an exceptional documentary" with "stunning battle scenes" and listed the film as the "third part of a long-lasting fresco devoted to men in war.

Tomorrow Tripoli was screened as part of the exhibition "Soulèvements", organized at the French Gallery Jeu de Paume, Paris. Nicole Brenez wrote a text about it in the exhibition catalogue:

To the traditional couple Disinformation and Counter-information, we must now add the term Ur-Information, the original information, insofar as it precedes official information, which exploits it to distort, simplify and betray it. The end of the 1990s saw the simultaneous blossoming of Counter-Information collectives such as IndyMedia, and solitary politicians, practicing visual assault as freely as Albert Londres does literary reporting. "

The documentary, supported by the French independent distributor Les Mutins de Pangée, has been released in several cinemas in France in the fall of 2019 in the presence of the filmmaker.

=== The A.I. AT WAR project (2017-2020) ===
Florent Marcie is currently shooting a film on the journey of an artificial intelligence in a war zone titled "A.I. AT WAR".

He was wounded in the head in January 2019 by a police shooting while filming at a demonstration of the Yellow Vest Movement. Following this, Florent Marcie denounced the abusive use of this weapon by police officers in a column for the online newspaper Mediapart.

Florent Marcie attended the Athens Avant-Garde Film Festival in 2019 during which he showed his films and gave a masterclass.

== Filmography ==
- The Tunnel Tribe (La tribu du tunnel, 1995, 49 min). A year in the life of Richard, Sylvain, Nono and Calou, who live with their four dogs in a train tunnel in the Petite Ceinture region of Paris.
- Under the Trees of Ajiep (Sous les arbres d'Ajiep, 1998, 64 min). South Sudan, summer 1998. Famine. How a young Sudanese mother tries to survive with her two little girls when she arrives in a camp.
- Saïa (Saïa, 2000, 30 min). A front line, at night, in Afghanistan.
- The kiosk and the war (Le Kiosque et la guerre, 2003, 52 min). In the spring of 2003, as the first American bombs fall on Iraq, a camera films the front pages of magazines sliding on the front of a Parisian newsstand...
- Itchkeri Kenti (Itchéri Kenti, les Fils de l'Itchkérie2006, 145 min). Winter 1996, Chechen war. A young French director, armed with a painting canvas, travels clandestinely through the country to meet a people in resistance.
- Humanitarian Generation (2009, 90 min). Portrait of a group of humanitarian workers in Chad.
- Commander Khawani (Commandant Khawani, 2014, 1 hr 26). The story of an Afghan commander and his men on the front line at Bagram.
- Tomorrow Tripoli (Tomorrow Tripoli, 2015, 2h53 hours). The Libyan revolution filmed from the inside with Zintan rebels in Jebel Nefoussa.
