= Fort Marcy =

Fort Marcy may refer to:

- Fort Marcy (Virginia), earthwork fort completed in 1862, now a public park
- Fort Marcy (New Mexico), fort in Santa Fe used during the Mexican–American War and the American Civil War
- Fort Marcy (horse), American thoroughbred racehorse
