= Henry O. Marcy =

American physician (1837–1924)

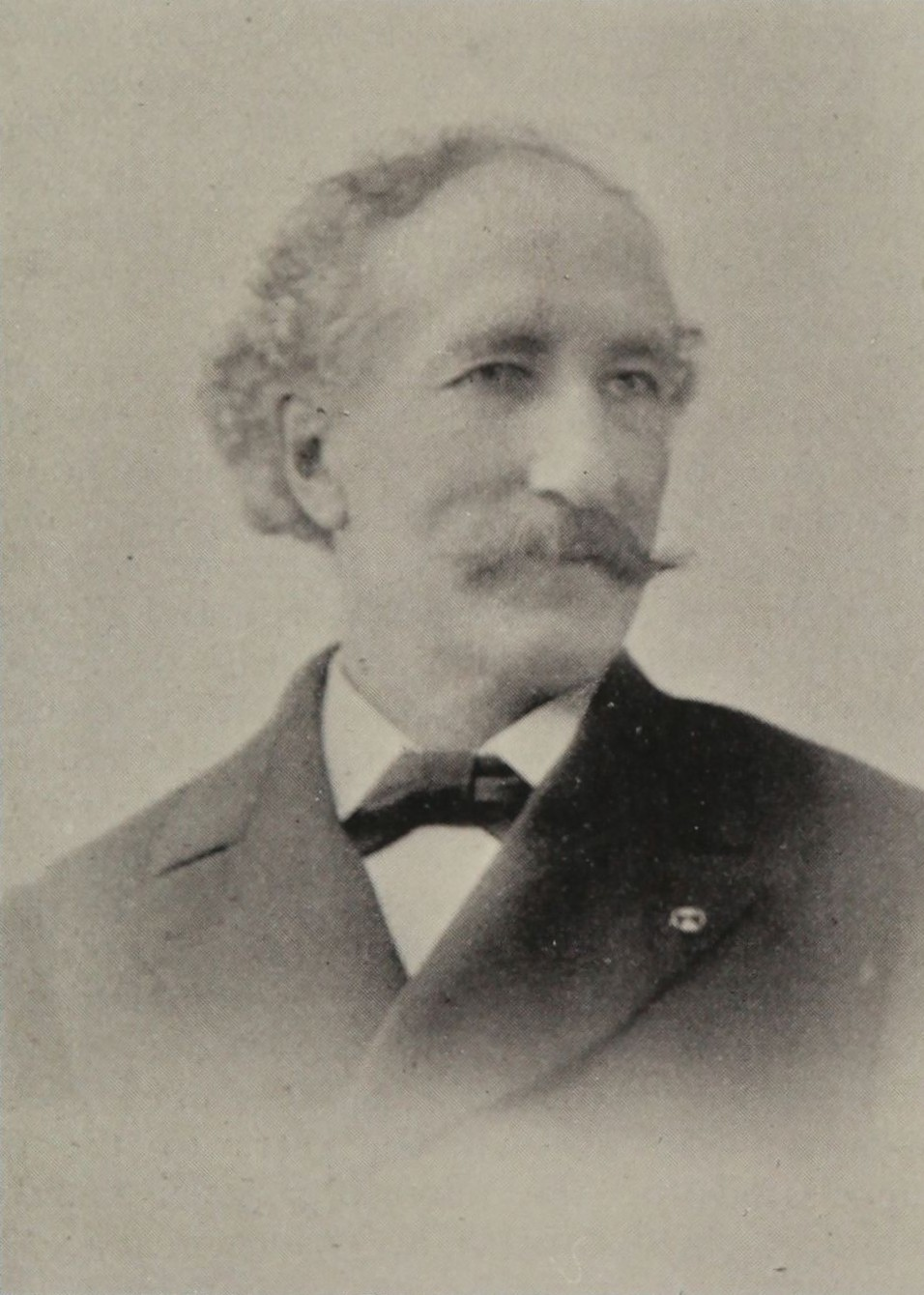
Photograph of Watson published in 1896

Henry O. Marcy (1837–1924) was an American surgeon. He served as a surgeon in the Union Army during the American Civil War. After the war, he established his own surgical practice, becoming an advocate for antiseptic technique in surgery. He was particularly known for describing a technique using antiseptic-treated catgut sutures to seal internal wounds in the treatment of hernias. Marcy was elected president of the American Academy of Medicine in 1884 and the American Medical Association in 1892.

== Early life ==
Henry Orlando Watson was born June 23, 1837, in Otis, Massachusetts to Smith and Fanny (Gibbs) Marcy. He attended school at Wilbraham Academy and Amherst College before attending Harvard Medical School, earning his medical doctorate in 1863. In October 1863 he married Sarah E. Wendell.

== Military service ==
In April 1863, Marcy was appointed assistant surgeon to the 43rd Massachusetts Volunteers. In November of that year he was named surgeon of the First Regiment of Colored Troops. In 1864, Marcy was appointed medical director of Florida. The next year, at the direction of General William Tecumseh Sherman, Marcy oversaw the sanitation and renovation of Charleston, South Carolina. He resigned his commission in June 1865. He returned to Cambridge, Massachusetts to work as an assistant at Harvard Medical School.

== Travels in Europe ==
In 1869, embarked on a multi-year trip touring European hospitals and universities. For a year, he studied at the University of Berlin under the tutelage of Rudolf Virchow. That summer he continued to study medicine first in London under Thomas Spencer Wells, then in Edinburg where he was a student to Joseph Lister. Marcy left Edinburg a lifelong proponent of Lister's practice of antiseptic surgery and wound care.

== Medical career ==
Marcy returned to the United States in 1870. He quickly gained recognition for his surgical work. Lister had advocated using antiseptic-soaked catgut to tie and seal arteries during surgery. Marcy extended this technique for the closure of internal wounds made in surgery to cure hernias. He tested his method in various laboratory animals, finding wounds sealed in this manner to be fully healed and reconnected to nearby connective tissue. Marcy also engaged in investigation of various animal tissues as possible replacements for catgut sutures, eventually advocating for tendons from kangaroo tails as a superior suture material.

That year, Marcy established The Cambridge Hospital for Women, focused on surgical treatment of the diseases of women.

Marcy was active in medical affairs. He served as the American Medical Association's vice president in 1880, and was elected its president for the 1891–1892 term. He was a founding member of the American College of Surgeons and the American Medical Editors Association. Marcy had a particular interest in medical education, serving as president of the education-focused American Academy of Medicine in 1884.

== Engagement in Cambridge ==
In addition to his medical career, Marcy was an active participant in the administration and development of Cambridge. An obituary credited him as "instrumental in building the Harvard Bridge, the Charles River Basin, the Cambridge Esplanada Parkway" and as being the owner of the site that was developed into the Massachusetts Institute of Technology.

== Later years ==
Sarah Marcy died in 1910. Two years later Marcy married Mary E. Smeed of Batavia, New York. He died at his Cambridge home on January 1st, 1924.
