= Marcy Park =

Marcy Park can refer to:

- Marcy Park, a character in the musical The 25th Annual Putnam County Spelling Bee
- Marcy Park, a park in Marcy-Holmes, Minneapolis, Minnesota
- Marcy Park, a park located in University City, San Diego, California
