= Paolo Marsi =

Italian humanist

Paolo Marsi or Paolo Marso, in Latin Paulus Marsus or Paulus Marsus Piscinas (1440–1484) was an Italian humanist and poet known primarily for his commentary on the Fasti of Ovid.

Marsi was born at Pescina, and was the brother of the Pietro Marsi who was an acquaintance of Erasmus. He was a student of Pomponio Leto, and became a professor of rhetoric. He was a friend of Lodovico Lazzarelli, and a member of the Roman Academy who participated in antiquarian activities such as celebrating the founding of Rome. In the 1460s, several of the sodality's members, including the Marsi brothers, were imprisoned for fomenting "republicanism, paganism, and conspiracy". Marsi was among the poets who addressed homoerotic praise in the manner of Martial to Lucio Fazini, a handsome young scholar who was also incarcerated and tortured for pursuing classical studies.

Marsi died in 1484, shortly after he delivered the funeral oration for Andrea Brenta.

Marsi's commentary had a "supplemental influence" on The Rape of Lucrece by Shakespeare, who drew primarily on Ovid's account in the Fasti.
