= Pietro Marso =

Italian priest, humanist and a teacher of rhetoric (1441-1511)

Pietro Marso, in Latin Petrus Marsus (30 October 1441 – 30 December 1511), was an Italian priest and humanist. Learned in Greek and a teacher of rhetoric, he mainly wrote commentaries on the classics.

== Life ==
Marso was born on or around 30 October 1441 in Cese dei Marsi. His birth date is estimated based on his obituary in the Vatican Apostolic Library and his epitaph in San Lorenzo in Damaso, which give him an age at death of seventy years and two months. Little is known of his family, whose name comes from the region of Marsica. By 1508 he had inherited property at Cese and his two brothers, Domenico and Giovanni, were dead.

As a young man, Marso took holy orders. He studied under Giulio Pomponio Leto at the latter's Roman Academy, where he also befriended Bartolomeo Platina. He was arrested in 1468 and imprisoned for a year in the Castel Sant'Angelo because of his involvement with the Academy. Among those imprisoned with him were Marco Lucido Fazini, Demetrio Guazzelli, Agostino Maffei and Antonio Settimuleio Campano. He is sometimes confused with Paolo Marsi da Pescina, who in fact included a poem Ad fratres Academicos Romae captivos ("to the captive Roman academics") in his Bembicae.

In 1470–71, Marso studied under Domizio Calderini in Rome. In 1472, he studied Greek under Johannes Argyropoulos. Also in that year, he became the tutor to Cristoforo Piccolomini, nephew of Cardinal Iacopo Ammanati, on Pomponio Leto's recommendation. In 1478–80, he taught at the University of Bologna. He tutored Ludovico, the younger brother of Cardinal Francesco Gonzaga, which took him to Mantua in 1479.

Sometime before 1481, possibly as early as 1476, Marso took up a position teaching rhetoric at the University of Rome. His most prominent student was Paolo Cortesi. He died in Rome on 30 December 1511. When Desiderius Erasmus met him in Rome not long before his death, he thought he was nearly eighty.

== Work ==
Marso published commentaries on Cicero's De officiis (1481), De senectute (1494) and De natura deorum, all printed at Venice. He also penned a commentary on the Punica of Silius Italicus (Venice, 1483), based on an edition published by Pomponio Leto in 1471. While staying in Viterbo, he wrote a commentary on Ovid's Ibis (1472), printed at Rome. In Bologna, he wrote an oration on Virgil's Georgics, praising the rustic hardiness of the ancients. In Mantua, he wrote what he termed a silva—modeled on the Silvae of Statius—about Andes, the birthplace of Virgil and entitled Andes Virgilii natale solum (1480). A poem in 214 hexameters, he dedicated it to the Marquis Federico I of Mantua, elder brother of Cardinal Francesco Gonzaga.

After the death of Argyropoulos in 1487, Marso edited his friend's Latin translation of Aristotle's Nicomachean Ethics (1492), which was printed at Rome with a dedication by Marso to Gentile Virginio Orsini. He wrote and delivered several orations, including the funeral oration for Pomponio Leto in 1499.

== Bibliography ==
- Benedetti, Stefano (2008). "Marso, Pietro". Dizionario Biografico degli Italiani (in Italian). Vol. 71: Marsilli–Massimino da Salerno. Rome: Istituto dell'Enciclopedia Italiana. ISBN 978-88-12-00032-6.
- Lee, Egmont (2003). "Pietro Marso". In Peter G. Bietenholz (ed.). Contemporaries of Erasmus: A Biographical Register of the Renaissance and Reformation. Vol. 2, F–M. University of Toronto Press. p. 394.
- Gioseffi, Massimo (2010). "All'ombra dei grandi libri: la selva Andes di Pietro Marso" (PDF). CentoPagine. 4: 33–46.
