= Masayoshi Ōishi =

Japanese musician (born 1980)

Masayoshi Ōishi 大石 昌良
- Also known as: オーイシマサヨシ
- Born: January 5, 1980 (age 46); Uwajima, Japan
- Occupations: Musician, singer, songwriter
- Instruments: Guitar, vocals
- Years active: 2001–present
- Labels: KADOKAWA / Media Factory (2014–2018); Pony Canyon Inc. (2013–present)
- Website: www.014014.jp

Masayoshi Ōishi (大石 昌良, Ōishi Masayoshi; born January 5, 1980) is a Japanese musician. His professional music career began in 2001 as vocalist of the band Sound Schedule. Following the band's disbandment in 2006, he began a solo career, releasing his debut single "Honoka Terasu" in 2008. Sound Schedule reunited in 2011, with Ōishi returning as the band's vocalist.

Ōishi is also vocalist of the musical group OxT, led by composer Tom Hack. In 2014, Ōishi's song "Kimi Ja Nakya Dame Mitai" was used as the opening theme to the anime series Monthly Girls' Nozaki-kun, and in 2018, his song "Otomodachi Film" was used as the opening theme to the anime series Tada Never Falls in Love. In 2023 his song "Megane Go Round" was used as the ending theme to the anime Suki na Ko ga Megane o Wasureta. He has also written songs for other artists, such as "Yōkoso Japari Park e" which was used as the opening theme to the anime series Kemono Friends.

== Early life ==
Ōishi was born in Uwajima, Ehime on January 5, 1980. He graduated from the Kobe University of Commerce (now part of University of Hyogo) and was a member of the school's light music club.

== Career ==
In 1999, Ōishi formed the band Sound Schedule with other members of his university's light music club, making their major debut in 2001. Following the band's dissolution in 2006, he started a solo career, beginning with the release of his debut single "Honoka Terasu" (ほのかてらす) on June 25, 2008. This was followed by the release of his second single "Ushiro no Shōmen" (うしろのしょうめん) on September 24, 2008. In November of that year, he released his first album Ano Machi Kono Machi (あの街この街).

In 2009, Ōishi released two singles: "Love" on June 17, and "Gensō Underground" (幻想アンダーグラウンド) on October 21, as well as his second album G.D. Attraction (G.D. アトラクション).

In 2011, Sound Schedule decided to reunite after a five-year break, with Ōishi returning as the band's vocalist. Although the reunion was intended to be a temporary affair, at the end of the band's tour in 2012, it was announced that the band would continue its activities. Ōishi would remain as the band's vocalist while also continuing his solo career. In 2012, he released his third album 31 Myscream (31 マイスクリーム).

In 2013, Ōishi released his fourth album Magical Music Tour (マジカルミュージックツアー). He also began collaborating with composer Tom Hack for musical releases. Their first collaboration was the single "Go Exceed!!" which was released on October 30, 2013; the title track was used as the first opening theme to the anime series Ace of Diamond. This was followed by the single "Perfect Hero" which was released on May 21, 2014; the title track is used as the second opening theme to Ace of Diamond. That same year, he released the single "Kimi Ja Nakya Dame Mitai" (君じゃなきゃダメみたい) on August 27; the title track is used as the opening theme to the anime series Monthly Girls' Nozaki-kun.

In 2015, Ōishi and Tom Hack formed the musical group OxT. The group's first single was "Kimero", the title track of which was used as the second ending theme to Ace of Diamond. The group has since performed theme songs for anime series such as Overlord, Prince of Stride, and Hand Shakers. That same year, Ōishi also released his fifth album Ōishi Masayoshi no Hikigatari Lab (大石昌良の弾き語りラボ, Ōishi Masayoshi no Hikigatari Rabo).

In 2016, Ōishi wrote the song "Yōkoso Japari Park e" (ようこそジャパリパークへ), which was used as the opening theme to the anime series Kemono Friends. The song became very popular in Japan, topping Amazon Japan's soundtrack ranking as well as ranking third in the country's iTunes song charts. His own cover received over one million views in the span of two weeks on Japanese video-sharing site Niconico. That same year, he wrote the song "Eien Loop" (永遠ループ) by Ami Wajima, which was used as the second ending theme to the anime series Kuromukuro. He released his sixth album Kimi ni Kikaseru Monogatari (君に聞かせる物語) on July 13, 2016.

In 2017, Ōishi released his seventh album Kariuta (仮歌), which included a cover of "Yōkoso Japari Park e". The following year, he released the single "Otomodachi Film" (オトモダチフィルム, Otomodachi Firumu), the title track of which was used as the opening theme to the anime series Tada Never Falls in Love.

In 2018, Ōishi collaborated with Tsuburaya Productions for their 28 entry of the Ultraman Series, Ultraman R/B. Ōishi's song Hands was used as the shows opening, and another song Ultra Sing! was made for the album released to promote the series later in the year.

In 2021 his song "Imperfect" was used as the opening theme to the anime series SSSS.Dynazenon.

In 2023 his song "Megane go Round" was used as the ending theme for the anime The Girl I Like Forgot Her Glasses. He composed and wrote the lyrics to Airi Suzuki's single "Saikyō no Oshi!"; it was used as the theme song to the live-action television drama adaptation My Oshi Is Now My Boss, and Ōishi also made a guest appearance in the drama.

In 2024 his song "Namaramenkoi Gal" was used as the opening theme for the anime Hokkaido Gals Are Super Adorable!.

In 2025, Ōishi returned to compose and write lyrics to "Isshun Kimi Oshi" for Airi Suzuki, which was used as the theme song for My Oshi Is Now My Boss: Full Throttle; Ōishi returned as a guest character for the drama.

== Personal life ==
In 2020, Ōishi announced he had married a woman who is outside of the entertainment industry.

== Discography ==
=== Singles ===
Title	Peak Oricon position	Album
Honoka Terasu (ほのかてらす): Release date: June 25, 2008	67	Ano Machi Kono Machi
Ushiro no Shōmen (うしろのしょうめん): Release date: September 24, 2008	60	Ano Machi Kono Machi
Love (ラブ): Release date: June 17, 2009	71	G.D. Attraction
Gensō Underground (幻想アンダーグラウンド): Release date: October 21, 2009	86	G.D. Attraction
Go Exceed!!: Release date: October 13, 2013	66	OxT Complete Songs TV Anime "Ace of Diamond"
Perfect Hero: Release date: May 21, 2014	51	OxT Complete Songs TV Anime "Ace of Diamond"
Kimi Ja Nakya Dame Mitai (君じゃなきゃダメみたい): Release date: August 27, 2014	23	Non-album singles
Parallel World (パラレルワールド): Release date: March 19, 2018	51	Non-album singles
Otomodachi Film (オトモダチフィルム, Otomodachi Firumu): Release date: May 23, 2018	30	Non-album singles
Hands: Release date: July 18, 2018	50	Entertainer
Borderline (ボーダーライン): Release date: November 21, 2018	55	Non-album single
Rakuentoshi (楽園都市): Release date: August 21, 2019	28	Entertainer
Sekai ga Kimi wo Hitsuyoutosuru Toki ga Kitanda / Eiyu no Uta (世界が君を必要とする時が来たんだ/英雄の歌): Release date: June 3, 2020	18	Entertainer
Imperfect (インパーフェクト): Release date: April 21, 2021	21	Entertainer
Role Playing (ロールプレイング): Release date: April 21, 2021	39	Entertainer
Koi wa Explosion (feat. Yukari Tamura (恋はエクスプロージョン(feat.田村ゆかり)): Release date: June 1, 2022	28	Universe
Gift (ギフト): Release date: January 8, 2023	16	Universe
Shinda! (死んだ！): Release date: May 31, 2023	28	Universe
"Suki ni Naccha Dame na Hito" (好きになっちゃダメな人, "A Person You Shouldn't Fall in Love With"): Release date: September 29, 2023	35	Universe
"Namaramenkoi Gal" (なまらめんこいギャル): Release date: February 7, 2024	25	Universe

=== Albums ===
Title	Peak Oricon chart position
Ano Machi Kono Machi (あの街この街): Release date: November 26, 2008	103
G.D. Attraction (G.D. アトラクション): Release date: November 19, 2009	85
31 Myscream (31 マイスクリーム): Release date: January 25, 2011	116
Magical Music Tour (マジカルミュージックツアー): Release date: February 20, 2013	132
Ōishi Masayoshi no Hikigatari Lab (大石昌良の弾き語りラボ, Ōishi Masayoshi no Hikigatari Rabo): Release date: December 2, 2015	39
Kimi ni Kikaseru Monogatari (君に聞かせる物語): Release date: July 13, 2016	32
Kariuta (仮歌): Release date: July 26, 2017	15
Kariuta II (仮歌II): Release date: June 26, 2019	24
Entertainer (エンターテイナー): Release date: August 25, 2021	19
Masayoshi Oishi One-Man Live "Entertainer" (オーイシマサヨシ ワンマンライブ「エンターテイナー」): Release date: March 23, 2022	141
Universe (ユニバース): Release date: February 7, 2024	16
Kariuta III (仮歌Ⅲ): Release date: August 26, 2026	23
