= List of Gridman characters =

In the context of fictional media, List of Gridman characters may refer to:

- List of Gridman the Hyper Agent characters, who appeared in the 1993 Tokusatsu show Gridman the Hyper Agent.
- List of Gridman Universe characters, who appeared in Studio Trigger's anime and manga adaptation of the previous series, covering SSSS.Gridman, SSSS.Dynazenon, and Gridman Universe
