= List of Gridman Universe characters =

This list covers the characters from SSSS.Gridman, SSSS.Dynazenon, and Gridman Universe by Studio Trigger in the Gridman Universe, a fictional world created by Tsuburaya Productions.

== Protagonists ==
=== Gridman ===
Voiced by: Hikaru Midorikawa and Yūya Hirose (Japanese); Robert McCollum and Brandon McInnis (English)
Gridman (グリッドマン, Guriddoman) is a Hyper Agent (ハイパーエージェント, Haipā Ējento) of the alternate dimension Hyper World (ハイパーワールド, Haipā Wārudo) who attempted to save Akane Shinjō when Alexis Kerib brought her to a replica of Tsutsujidai City. But Gridman is defeated by Alexis Kerib and fragmented across Tsutsujidai with one piece of him inhabiting the body of Yūta Hibiki with his memories sealed in the process while his subconscious resides in the pawnshop's PC Junk. The subconscious reminds Yūta of his mission, explaining they need to merge in order for Gridman to battle the Kaiju attacking the city. While Yūta and the Neon Genesis Junior High Students were the only ones that could interact with Gridman, Rikka and Utsumi are able to perceive him after witnessing his first fight and Calibur upgrading Junk.
Because of his fragmented state, Gridman was forced to wear limiter armor that initially in his purple-colored Initial Fighter (イニシャルファイター, Inisharu Faitā) before it is optimized into the reddened Primal Fighter (プライマルファイター, Puraimaru Faitā) by Junk's upgrade. His finisher is Grid Beam (グリッドビーム, Guriddo Bīmu), an attack fired from his Accepter on the left hand. As the Neon Genesis Junior High are embodiments of the other fragments of his being, Gridman can use their Assist Weapons form for additional strength in combat.

- Heracles Combine Max Gridman (剛力合体超人 マックスグリッドマン, Gōriki Gattai Chōjin Makkusu Guriddoman): A formation with Battle Tracto Max forms a pair of gigantic forearms and increases his brute strength. His finishers are Max Grid Beam (マックスグリッドビーム, Makkusu Guriddo Bīmu) and Super Lightning Kick (超電撃キック, Chō Dengeki Kikku).
- Full Armor Combine Buster Gridman (武装合体超人 バスターグリッドマン, Busō Gattai Chōjin Basutā Guriddoman): A formation with Buster Borr, granting him a chest armor and a set of ranged weapons from his caterpillar threads and Twin Drills in Buster Mode (バスターモード, Basutā Mōdo). His finisher is Twin Buster Grid Beam (ツインバスターグリッドビーム, Tsuin Basutā Guriddo Bīmu).
- Empyrean Combine Sky Gridman (大空合体超人 スカイグリッドマン, Ōzora Gattai Chōjin Sukai Guriddoman): A formation which occurs when Sky Vitter forms as Gridman's helmet, waist and leg armor. In this form, Gridman gains superiority in high-altitude combat and disorient his opponents with Lucky Smokescreen (ラッキースモークスクリーン, Rakkī Sumōkusukurīn).
- Hyperlink Combine Full Powered Gridman (超合体超人 フルパワーグリッドマン, Chō Gattai Chōjin Furu Pawā Guriddoman): Gridman's ultimate formation attained by combining with the four Assist Weapons at the same time. In this case, both Gridman and the Assist Weapons are deployed in half their usual size to conserve energy, forming a full-sized robot once combined. In this form, Gridman has all the abilities and techniques from his other formations at his disposal. His finisher is the Grid Full Power Finish (グリッドフルパワーフィニッシュ, Guriddo Furu Pawā Finisshu).

After the Neon Genesis Students restore the fragments to Gridman, he regained his original form and powers while defeating Alexis. During the events of Gridman Universe, revealed to have created adult clones of Anti and 2nd to aid the Gauma Squad during the events of SSSS Dynazenon, Gridman gains the ability to transform into his white-armored Universe Fighter (ユニバースファイター, Yunibāsu Faitā) form and combine with Dynazenon and Big Golburn to become Rogue Kaiser Gridman (ローグカイゼルグリッドマン, Rōgu Kaizeru Guriddoman).

=== Gridman Alliance ===
Gridman Alliance (グリッドマン同盟, Guriddoman Dōmei) is a trio of high school students who are the protagonists of SSSS Gridman, helping the Hyper Agent Gridman battle the Kaiju attacking their city. Due to their connection with the hero, they were the only ones who are not affected by the changes made when one of Akane's Kaiju killed a victim, causing them to be erased from existence. Their base of operations is Junk Shop Aya, Rikka's shophouse.

Yūta Hibiki (響 裕太, Hibiki Yūta)
Voiced by: Yūya Hirose (Japanese); Brandon McInnis (English)
An amnesiac young boy who wakes up near Rikka's house who lives alone in his family's apartment since his parents are on a business trip, initially being the only one who can see Gridman and the Kaiju custodians around the city. It would later be revealed that he is actually Gridman possessing the real Yūta, regaining his memories and leaving his host once he became whole and captured Alexis. During the events of Gridman Universe, piecing together the missing parts of his memory from being possessed, Yuta becomes a willingly host to Gridman when the latter needs his help. The character is based on Naoto Sho (翔 直人, Shō Naoto) from the original tokusatsu show.
Rikka Takarada (宝多 六花, Takarada Rikka)
Voiced by: Yume Miyamoto (Japanese); Jill Harris (English)
The sole female member of Gridman Alliance and Yūta's classmate, who found the amnesiac boy in front of her house. Out of her teammates, she desires a normal life but wishes Yūta to keep fighting as Gridman to save their friends. She also extends that wish towards Akane, even after learning that she was created by Akane and programmed to be her friend. The character is based on Yuka Inoue (井上 ゆか, Inoue Yuka) from the original tokusatsu show.
Shō Utsumi (内海 将, Utsumi Shō)
Voiced by: Soma Saito (Japanese); Greg Ayres (English)
Yūta's classmate and founder of the Gridman Alliance, specialized in human networking and is a fan of tokusatsu, including the Ultra Series. He also had a crush on Akane before learning the truth about her and their world, going through a bit of an existential crisis over it. The character is based on Ippei Baba (馬場 一平, Baba Ippei) from the original tokusatsu show.

==== NGJHS ====
The NGJHS, short for Neon Genesis Junior High Students (新世紀中学生, Shinseiki Chūgakusei; Lit "New Generation Junior High Students"), is a quartet of Hyper Agents who pose as youths dressed in black. They are later revealed to be embodiments of Gridman's scattered fragments modeled after his memories and became living beings in their own right. This factor plays in their Assist Weapon (アシストウェポン, Ashisuto Wepon) forms being able to combine with Gridman and increase his power, initially one at a time before their power output is reduced so they can all appear and form Full Powered Gridman. But when Gridman is absent, the Assist Weapons can combine on their own into War God Combine Powered Zenon (合体戦人 パワードゼノン, Gattai Senjin Pawādo Zenon). In contrast to the agile Gridman, Powered Zenon relies on strength and its signature move is Powered Breaker (パワードブレイカー, Pawādo Bureikā). During the events of Gridman Universe, joined by Rex, the Assist Weapons gain the ability turn into a purple version of their Powered Zenon form called Powered Knight Zenon and combine with Gridknight to form Full Power Gridknight.

Samurai Calibur (サムライ・キャリバー, Samurai Kyaribā)
Voiced by: Ryōsuke Takahashi (Japanese); Ian Sinclair (English)
A man who helped the Gridman Alliance to optimize Junk and search for the missing victims of Ghoulghilas' attack. He is named after the Samurai Sword from Superhuman Samurai Syber-Squad. He has four swords stored on his back, one being a katana and two other is a pair of barbed broadswords.
His Assist Weapon form is Electrifying Great Sword Gridman Calibur (電撃大斬剣 グリッドマンキャリバー, Dengeki Daizanken Guriddoman Kyaribā), a sword that allows Gridman to perform Grid Calibur End (グリッドキャリバーエンド, Guriddo Kyaribā Endo). During the formation of Full Power Gridman, the Axe Blade (アックスブレード, Akkusu Burēdo) jettisoned and becomes the formation's breastplate. When the rest of his teammates combine into Powered Zenon, Gridman Calibur turns into Powered Axe (パワードアックス, Pawādo Akkusu), allowing them to execute Jumbo Saber Slash (ジャンボセイバースラッシュ, Janbo Seibā Surasshu). Under possession of Gridknight, the Gridman Calibur transforms into Gridknight Calibur (グリッドナイトキャリバー, Guriddonaito Kyaribā) to perform Knight Calibur End (ナイトキャリバーエンド, Naito Kyaribā Endo).
Max (マックス, Makkusu)
Voiced by: Katsuyuki Konishi (Japanese); Cris George (English)
A tall man with a mask, his weapon is a pair of gauntlets, transforming into a mace for self-defense purpose. His Assist Weapon form is named after the Tracto combat vehicle and its pilot Tanker from Superhuman Samurai Syber-Squad.
His Assist Weapon form is Battle Tracto Max (バトルトラクトマックス, Batoru Torakuto Makkusu), a ten-wheel drive armed with a pair of Tanker Cannons (タンカーキャノン, Tankā Kyanon).
Borr (ボラー, Borā)
Voiced by: Aoi Yūki (Japanese); Apphia Yu (English)
An androgynous boy who is named after the twin-driller tank from Superhuman Samurai Syber-Squad. He has a pair of handheld knives stored under his sleeves.
His Assist Weapon form is Buster Borr (バスターボラー, Basutā Borā), a yellow twin-driller subterrene armed with Forrester Extinguisher Missiles (フォレスター消火弾, Foresutā Shōka-dan) and Buster Grid Missiles (バスターグリッドミサイル, Basutā Guriddo Misairu). Despite the existence of his Twin Drills (ツインドリル, Tsuin Doriru), his teammates proclaimed them as non-functional in combat.
Vit (ヴィット, Vitto)
Voiced by: Masaya Matsukaze (Japanese); Chris Burnett (English)
A man with a laid-back attitude who is named after the Vitor fighter jet from Superhuman Samurai Syber-Squad.
His Assist Weapon form is Sky Vitter (スカイヴィッター, Sukai Vittā), a blue-colored fighter jet armed with Laser Circus Amp (アンプレーザーサーカス, Anpu Rēzā Sākasu).

=== Gauma Squad ===
The protagonists of SSSS Dynazenon.

Gauma (ガウマ)
Voiced by: Daiki Hamano (Japanese); Aaron Campbell (English)
A mysterious man who befriended Yomogi after the latter offered him food, piloting the Dynadiver (ダイナダイバー, Dainadaibā) submarine component of Dynazenon. Gauma is a Kaiju User (怪獣使い, Kaijū Tsukai) whose power to manipulate monsters diminished, forcing him to instead pilot the titular mecha, Dynazenon. Gauma is later revealed to be a former member of the Kaiju Club in their previous incarnation from five millennia prior, who died fighting against the others when they betrayed the princess they were sworn to protect. His mummified remains were uncovered during the events of Gridman the Hyper Agent, where he indirectly provided Gridman with the Assist Weapon Dyna Dragon. Because his link to the Kaiju was severed, Gauma is gradually dying and hides this fact from his teammates, eventually passing away after Gagula is destroyed. But Gauma's spirit reincarnates within Dynazenon, joining the Neon Genesis Junior High Students under the name Rex (レックス, Rekkusu).
Yomogi Asanaka (麻中 蓬, Asanaka Yomogi)
Voiced by: Junya Enoki (Japanese); Dallas Reid (English)
The main viewpoint character of SSSS.Dynazenon. A high school student in his first year who took on a part-time job at a convenience store to cope with his parents' divorce and his mother getting a boyfriend. He befriended Gauma after offering him food and was dragged into co-piloting Dynazenon due to being nearby when Shalbandes attacked. Out of the four pilots, Yomogi's work schedule prohibited him from spending more time in training for his piloting skills. During the course of the series, Yomogi develops the power of Instance Domination, allowing him to temporarily manipulate monsters.
Yomogi pilots the Dynasoldier (ダイナソルジャー, Dainasorujā) robot component of Dynazenon. In the presence of Gridknight, the robot is able to form into the Dynamic Cannon (ダイナミックキャノン, Dainamikku Kyanon) for the giant to wield.
In an original storyline written by Akira Amemiya for the SSSS.DYNAZENON SHOW, a live event held on October 17, 2021, Yomogi marries Yume ten years after the events of the series.
Yume Minami (南 夢芽, Minami Yume)
Voiced by: Shion Wakayama (Japanese); Kristen McGuire (English)
One of Yomogi's classmates; a girl with a reputation for cheating boys by always standing them up for "dates". She was forced by Gauma into co-piloting Dynazenon after she makes Yomogi her most recent victim. Many of her unusual traits are implied to be the result of her poor relationship with her late sister, who was found dead before the events of the story, and she spends much of her time investigating that incident.
Yume pilots the Dynawing (ダイナウイング, Dainauingu) stealth aircraft component of Dynazenon.
In an original storyline written by Akira Amemiya for the SSSS.DYNAZENON SHOW, a live event held on October 17, 2021, Yume marries Yomogi ten years after the events of the series.
Koyomi Yamanaka (山中 暦, Yamanaka Koyomi)
Voiced by: Yūichirō Umehara (Japanese); Jason Liebrecht (English)
A 33-year-old NEET who lives with his mother, who was forced by Gauma into co-piloting Dynazenon after Chise asked him to accompany her when the Kaiju Shalbandes attacked. He is highly troubled by an incident from his school years where a classmate asked him to run away with her after finding a large amount of money hidden in a nearby building, only for him to turn her down. When she turns out to be Yomogi's supervisor and recently married, he becomes deeply tormented by his past.
Koyomi pilots the Dynastriker (ダイナストライカー, Dainasutoraikā), a race car component of Dynazenon.
Chise Asukagawa (飛鳥川 ちせ, Asukagawa Chise)
Voiced by: Chika Anzai (Japanese); Megan Shipman (English)
Koyomi's cousin, who addresses the former as her senior. Although not a pilot of Dynazenon, Chise often hangs out with them due to Koyomi's participation, and had once substituted for Yomogi in Dynasoldier after he fell ill. Her deep frustrations regarding school and feeling excluded by the Dynazenon pilots manifest the Kaijuu Goldburn from its seed.
Dynazenon (ダイナゼノン, Dainazenon)
A Kaiju-fighting robot summoned by Gauma through the use of a dragon ornament given to him by the princess five thousand years ago, after his ability to control Kaiju diminished. As it requires four pilots to operate, Gauma was forced to include Yomogi, Yume and Koyomi as his co-pilots. Dynazenon becomes a living being when the deceased Gauma possesses it. Able to separate into three vehicles and a smaller dinosaur-like robot, Dynazenon's components can form several additional combinations:
- Dynarex (ダイナレックス, Dainarekkusu), an alternate combination of all its pieces with a more dragon-like appearance.
- Dynasoldier Wing Combine (ダイナソルジャーウイングコンバイン, Dainasorujā Uingu Konbain), formed with Dynasoldier and Dynawing.
- Dynasoldier Diver Combine (ダイナソルジャーダイバーコンバイン, Dainasorujā Daibā Konbain), formed with Dynasoldier and Dynadiver.
- Dynasoldier Striker Combine (ダイナソルジャーストライカーコンバイン, Dainasorujā Sutoraikā Konbain), formed with Dynasoldier and Dynastriker.
Goldburn (ゴルドバーン, Gorudobān)
Chise's personal Kaiju, named after an in-universe rock band and has the ability to change size. It was originally a baroque pearl that Chise picked up after Shalbandes's destruction, which slowly transformed into a golden-armored dragon over time. Unlike the stray Kaiju manipulated by the Club, Goldburn is loyal to Chise and serves a pivotal role alongside Dynazenon in forming Kaiser Gridknight and later Rouge Kaiser Gridman after evolving into Big Goldburn.

=== Gridknight Alliance ===
A pair of Kaiju in human form who appeared in SSSS Gridman. During the events of Gridman Universe, both their younger and older selves existed as separate entities until they were synced to fight Mad Origin. They travel across the universes using the Kaiju Battleship Sounderous (怪獣戦艦サウンドラス, Kaijū Senkan Saundorasu).

Anti (アンチ, Anchi) / Knight (ナイト, Naito) / Gridknight (グリッドナイト, Guriddonaito)
Voiced by: Kenichi Suzumura (Japanese); Stephen Fu (English)
A sentient Kaiju that Akane created to destroy Gridman, able to assume the form of a human middle schooler with a hand buzzsaw as his weapon, along with replicating Gridman's powers. While loyal to Akane despite her abusive nature, Anti's obsession with defeating Gridman made him detrimental to her agenda, resulting in him being scarred by Alexis. After Akane severed her ties to Anti when he learned he had become a sentient being, Anti became Gridman's ally and evolved into Gridknight. Anti aids the Gridman Alliance before being stabbed by Alexis while extracting Akane from Zegga, initiating Access Flash before succumbing to his injuries. He was nursed to health by Anosillus the 2nd, with his scarred left eye fully healed.
In SSSS Dynazenon, Anti, renamed Knight, arrives to Fujiyokidai to assist the Gauma Squad in fighting against the Kaiju assaults, able to influence Dynazenon as part of his armaments. Younger and older versions of himself were now synced during the battle against Mad Origin.
- Kaiser Gridknight (カイゼルグリッドナイト, Kaizeru Guriddonaito): The fusion of Gridknight with Dynazenon and Goldburn, taking Dynasoldier's place as the central component while the latter becomes the Dynamic Cannon on his right shoulder. Gridknight can also initiate this fusion even if the Dynazenon pilots are absent, though it is weaker in combat.
- Grid Burn Knight (グリッドバーンナイト, Guriddo Bān Naito): The fusion between Gridknight and Goldburn, the latter acting as his flight pack.
- Hyperlink Combine Full Powered Gridknight (超合体超人 フルパワーグリッドナイト, Chō Gattai Chōjin Furu Pawā Griddonaito): Gridknight's fusion with the four Assist Weapons.
Kaiju Girl Anosillus the 2nd (怪獣少女アノシラス（2代目）, Kaijū Shōjo Anoshirasu) / The 2nd (2代目, Nidaime)
Voiced by: Karin Takahashi (Japanese); Monica Rial (English)
A mysterious human-like Kaiju who is Anosillus's successor, able to enlarge herself. Sharing her predecessor's gratitude towards Gridman and desire to repay their debt, Anosillus the 2nd reveals to Yūta that the world he inhabited was created by Akane. She later tends to Anti's injuries following Alexis's defeat.
In SSSS Dynazenon, 2nd arrives to Fujiyokidai to assist the Gauma Squad in fighting against the Kaiju assaults, wielding a twirling baton to fix damage similarly to Unison in Gridman the Hyper Agent. Younger and older versions of herself were now synced during the battle against Mad Origin. The adult 2nd can also enlarge herself and convert Sounderous into a powered armor that she equips, giving her an appearance similar to the original Anosillus.

== Antagonists ==
=== Alexis Kerib ===
Voiced by: Tetsu Inada (Japanese); Barry Yandell (English)
Alexis Kerib (アレクシス・ケリヴ, Arekushisu Kerivu) is a digital immortal who is the antagonist of SSSS Gridman, bringing Akane's Kaiju to life with his Instance Abreaction (インスタンスアブリアクション, Insutansu Aburiakushon) ability. Despite being jovial around Akane, Alexis manipulates her since he thrives on others' negative emotions. He gradually reveals his true nature over the course of the series before absorbing a depressed Akane to assume a giant fighting form. But Alexis is defeated when Gridman uses his Grid Fixer Beam to negate his immortality, reduced to a smoking shard, which Gridman places in his custody. During the events of Gridman Universe, Alexis is forced to aid the Gridman Alliance and the Gauma Squad in battling Mad Origin, sacrificing himself to aid in the Kaiju's defeat.

=== Akane Shinjō ===
Voiced by: Reina Ueda (Japanese); Lindsay Seidel (English)
Akane Shinjō (新条 アカネ, Shinjō Akane) is Yūta's classmate who is both the most popular student in class and a Kaiju fan, revealed to be behind the Kaiju attacks on Tsutsujidai with Alexis bringing her sculptures to life so Akane can have them kill people for a sense of control. While Akane is a Kaiju User (怪獣使い, Kaijū Tsukai) who can subjugate Kaiju with Instance Domination (インスタンス・ドミネーション, Insutansu Dominēshon), she gives her Kaiju creations free rein to act as they please. Akane is later revealed to be from the real world, as Alexis brought her into a replica of Tsutsujidai she created for herself to escape from her troubles. But the Gridman Alliance's actions cause Akane to break down, forcing her to stab Yūta and then fall into a depression as Alexis turned her into a Kaiju and then absorbed her for her negativity. But after being freed, Akane realizes the error of her ways and decides to return to the real world. Akane, during the events of Gridman Universe, uses her Kaiju User powers to force Alexis to support the Gridman Alliance and the Gauma Squad. The character is based on Takeshi Todo (藤堂 武史, Todō Takeshi) from the original tokusatsu show.

=== Kaiju Club ===
The Kaiju Club (怪獣優生思想, Kaijū Yūsei Shisō) are a quartet of youths that serve as the antagonists of SSSS Dynazenon. Five thousand years prior, they were betrayed and killed by Gauma when he sided against them after they attempted a coup against their nation. Having been resurrected in the present day by their link to the Kaiju, the Club use their Instance Domination (インスタンス・ドミネーション, Insutansu Dominēshon) ability to take control of Kaiju so they can destroy humanity. After the death of Garnix and the discovery that no new Kaiju will ever be born again, the Kaiju Club disband and go their separate ways. In the last episode, however, they choose to be absorbed into Gagula to increase his power for his battle with Kaiser Gridknight, existing within it in a very similar way to how the pilots appear within Dynazenon. They are apparently killed after the death of Gagula, though Shimizu is seen afterwards in an indeterminate space.

Juuga (ジュウガ, Jūga)
Voiced by: Hiroshi Kamiya (Japanese); Y. Chang (English)
The perceptive member of the group. Juuga bears little resentment towards Gauma despite admitting that he felt betrayed regardless, as he profoundly respects Gauma. He expresses an interest in Dynazenon and assumes its co-pilots must be Kaiju Users as well.
Onija (オニジャ)
Voiced by: Yuma Uchida (Japanese); David Matranga (English)
The short-tempered member with a personal vendetta against Gauma for defecting from their group and using Dynazenon to fight against monsters. He holds a deep hatred for mankind and wants to kill as many people as possible. A running gag is that when Dynazenon destroys a monster, Onija is usually struck by falling debris and nearly killed.
Mujina (ムジナ)
Voiced by: Ayaka Suwa (Japanese); Kara Edwards (English)
The only female member of the group. Early on, she appears to have little motivation and to simply go along with what the others desire, but halfway through the series she grows closer to Onija and becomes far more aggressive.
Sizumu (シズム, Shizumu)
Voiced by: Koki Uchiyama (Japanese); Lee George (English)
The youngest member and de facto leader of the group after Gauma's defection. Sizumu transfers into Yomogi's and Yume's class in an attempt to understand their emotions and to explain his own motivations to them. He is said to be able to hear the voices of the Kaiju, and strongly believes that humans lose their freedom when they develop bonds with one another. After the defeat of Garnix he reveals that the Kaiju Gagula (ガギュラ, Gagyura) lives within him, and uses Instance Domination to assume a massive combined form that absorbs the other Club and battles Kaiser Gridknight in the last fight of the series. Even after their apparent death, he appears to have one last conversation with Yomogi in an alternative space, where he questions why Yomogi chose to give up the total freedom offered by the power of Kaiju to ignore reality and common sense.

=== Mad Origin ===
Voiced by: Nobutoshi Canna

Mad Origin (マッドオリジン, Maddo Orijin) is the main antagonist of Gridman Universe and is referred by Alexis as a Cluster of Kaiju origins (怪獣発生源の集合体, Kaijū hassei-gen no shūgō-tai), an intelligent Kaiju that embodies the worst of humanity and can speak human language through a monster generator built into his chest. Mad Origin interferes from outside Yuta's universe as part of his plan to cause a Big Crunch, seeking to plunge all reality into primordial chaos. However, Akane's return forces Mad Origin to personally battle the protagonists, able to fully counter Gridman and Gridknight's attacks. But Alexis's sacrifice allows Gridman and Gridknight to defeat Mad Origin.

=== Kaiju ===
Giant monsters that born the emotional states of humans, described by Sizumu in SSSS Dynazenon as embodiments of humanity's disillusionment from being restrained by emotional bonds. While most encountered are aggressive and embody humanity's negative emotions, there are those like the GridKnight Alliance and Golburn who are exposed to humanity's positive traits and become allies.

==== SSSS Gridman ====
Created from Akane's models through Alexis Kerib, these Kaiju are each a reflection of Akane's mental state. The Poison Gas Monsters that surround Tsutsujidai repair any damage done to the city following a Kaiju attack while altering peoples' memories of any casualties. When Akane fell into a depression following her stabbing Yūta, Alexis recreates all the Kaiju for a final attack on Tsutsujidai. But Gridknight and the Gridman Alliance destroy the Kaiju army.

Poison Gas Monster (毒煙怪獣, Doku Kemuri Kaijū)
A group of dinosaur-like monsters whose appearance is identical to Venora (it can possibly be concluded that these are Venora due to the identical subtitle and appearance) from Gridman the Hyper Agent. They function as the Tsutsujidai's maintenance system by repairing all the damages done by Akane's Kaiju and unleashing sleeping gas across the city to conceal the city's true nature by altering the residents' memories. Their existence were hidden from the townspeople, except to Gridman Alliance and the Neon Genesis Junior High Students. While Anonymous was deployed, it decapitated all Poison Gas Monsters during its rampaging spree.
Ghoulghlas (グールギラス, Gūrugirasu)
Created by Akane to exact revenge on Tonkawa for ruining her Special Dog with her volleyball, this dragon-like Kaiju monster killed her and some of their classmates while on a rampaging spree until it was killed by Gridman.

Mecha Ghoulgilas (メカグールギラス, Meka Gūrugirasu)
At some point of time, Akane recreated Ghoulgilas as a cyborg to interfere with the school festival as means of declaring war with the Gridman Alliance. With no other options left, Yuta proposes the plan on using a half-sized Gridman to scare the participants in the festival as Ghoulgilas rampages, allowing the battle to continue with little casualties. The rest of the Assist Weapons appear and combine with him to form Full Power Gridman and slay Ghoulgilas with Grid Full Power Finish.

Dévadadan (デバダダン, Debadadan)
Created to murder Akane's homeroom teacher for bumping into her without apologizing, this cybernetic monster is armed with a chest laser and the ability to reflect Gridman's Grid Beam. With Gridman's transformation time almost hit its limit, Samurai transforms into Gridman Calibur to aid the former and slices Dévadadan with Grid Calibur End, saving the teacher.
Gonglee (ゴングリー, Gongurī)
Created to attack the members of Arcadia after their date interrupted Akane's attempts in gathering information regarding Gridman from Rikka, Gonglee is an unspecified ambushed and killed three members with its smog, shrouding its presence from Gridman until the next day when it goes after Yamato. During their fight, Anti interfered and fought the monster over Gridman before Max Gridman defeated it, as his rival reverted to his human form due to the time limit.
Go'yavec (ゴーヤベック, Gōyabekku)
A gigantic mountainous monster that Akane created to kill Gridman and his human associates during their class field trip. Having disguised itself as the mountains, Go'yavec terrorizes the countryside until Buster Gridman destroyed it with Twin Buster Grid Beam.
Diriver (ヂリバー, Jiribā)
Created by Anti as means of draw out Gridman and fight him, Diriver is a Pteranodon-like monster operates a flying miniature UFO and use it to attack Gridman before Sky Vitter joins in to form Sky Gridman. As both Diriver and Anti went against their target, Gridman separated from Sky Vitter to slice the monster into half.
Bujack (バジャック, Bajakku)
An illusory cybernetic dragon monster used to trap the members of Gridman Alliance within a dream, each having befriended Akane. While Bujack influences on its victims, it was rendered intangible in real life until Gridman intruded through Grid Kinesis, ripping Bujack's wings to make it tangible and go on a rampage. The Neon Genesis Junior High Students then combine their Assist Weapon forms into Powered Zenon to quickly finish the monster off.
Anonymous (ナナシ, Nanashi)
Akane's final monster which she made at Alexis's urging, seemingly defeated by Full Powered Gridman. But Anonymous later sheds its skin to reveal a sinister embodiment of Akane's twisted will which slaughters the Poison Gas Monsters and defeats Full Powered Gridman. Anonymous nearly strangles Gridman to death when Anti intervenes with his new resolve to protect Gridman evolving him into Gridknight. With his new form, Anti reads through the monster's movements and destroy it.
Zegga (ゼッガー, Zeggā)
A gigantic ammonite-resembling monster that Alexis created from Akane using his Instance Abreaction on her, rampaging through the city before Gridknight appears and pulls out Akane from it before Alexis absorbed her. With no host, Zegga was left as an empty husk that rolled in Tsutsujidai before Gridman wiped it from existence with his Grid Fixer Beam.

==== SSSS Dynazenon ====
The Kaiju that appear are sought by the Kaiju Club, which seeks to control them and use them to wipe out mankind. When controlled by a Kaiju User's Instance Domination, they grew into red-eyed behemoths that towered over the cityscape, though Zaiohn grew massive without any external influence.

Shalbandes (シャルバンデス, Sharubandesu)
Voiced by: TBA (Japanese); Jordan Dash Cruz (English)
The first monster to appear, controlled by the Kaiju Club off-screen. After failing to tame the monster with his own power, Gauma was forced to summon Dynazenon for the first time. He eventually defeats it with the Dynarex formation.
Greyjhom (グレージョム, Gurējomu)
Voiced by: TBA (Japanese); Kevin Thelwell (English)
A monster that was originally shorter and docile, until being manipulated by Juuga. Yomogi and Yume drag the monster into the air with Dyna Wing Combine so that Gauma can bombard it with Dynadiver's missiles.
Burnaddon (バーナドドン, Bānadodon)
A monster that was manipulated by Onija, possessing the ability to generate large amounts of explosions. The Dynazenon team defeats it by taking it into space, where its explosives fail to detonate.
Didoras (ディドラス, Didorasu)
Manipulated by Mujina, it is a monster with the ability to temporarily transform three-dimensional objects into two-dimensional ones. It was destroyed by Dynarex's Rex Roar.
Neophobia (ネオフォビア, Neofobia)
A jellyfish-like monster with a hidden secondary mouth. It was manipulated by Sizumu from the water park and was destroyed by Dynarex.
Bullbind (ブルバイン, Burubain)
A winged four-legged monster manipulated by the combined powers of Onija and Mujina. Although it came close to destroying Dynarex, Gridknight's appearance forced the Club to transport the monster elsewhere. During Bullbind's second rampage, it was killed by the combined force of Dynazenon and Gridknight.
Zaiohn (ザイオーン, Zaiōn)
Voiced by: Iori Yoshida, Tōma Yoshida
Originally a small monster which the Gauma Squad discovered after it was abandoned by the Kaiju Club. The monster grew into a towering giant on its own and rampaged across the city, forcing Gridknight to destroy it using the Dynasoldier's Dynamic Cannon form.
Gibzorg (ギブゾーグ, Gibuzōgu)
A monster that Juuga manipulated in the light of Yume's personal issues. It was defeated by the newly formed Kaiser Gridknight.
Garnix (ガルニクス, Garunikusu)
The last stray monster to appear, it possessed a strange ability that trapped its victims in their own pasts, causing them to instantly vanish. It immediately caused the disappearance of the Kaiju Club when they attempted to control it, then caused the entire city to vanish bit by bit. With most of the pilots already taken by its effect, Yomogi was forced to travel through the space within it and bring the others back into the present so that they could fight. After rescuing his teammates and Knight, they formed Kaiser Gridknight and destroyed the monster.

==== Gridman Universe ====
Kaiju created by Mad Origin to aid his plans. Like Mad Origin, their names are close anagrams of Gridman's name.

Dimorgan (ディモルガン, Dimorugan)
The first kaiju sent to Tsutsuji-dai by Mad Origin. It attacks with tentacles that emerge from projections on its back, shock waves from its mouth, and destructive rays from the crystalline body on its chest and arms.
Domgiran (ドムギラン, Domugiran)
The second kaiju sent to Tsutsuji-dai by Mad Origin. It is both agile and powerful, and has the potential to take on both Full Power Gridman and Kaiser Grid Knight at the same time. Its attacks include thunderbolts from its entire body, photoballs from both palms, and destructive rays from the tip of its tail, and when its hands are joined together, it releases an even larger beam.
Noir Dogma (ノワールドグマ, Nowāru Doguma)
The third kaiju created by Mad Origin in order to eliminate countless irregular beings that should not exist in the world. It is characterized by a hard shell that covers its entire body, and it shoots beams from an umbrella-shaped part on its head. Some of them can also fly in the sky.

== Others ==
=== Tsutsujidai High School ===
Namiko Kōzuki (Namiko) (上月 奈美子（なみこ）, Kōzuki Namiko (Namiko)) and Ren Nomura (Hass) (野村 蓮（はっす）, Nomura Ren (Hassu))
Voiced by: Suzuko Mimori (Namiko), Akari Kitō (Hass) (Japanese); Sarah Wiedenheft (Namiko), Amber Lee Connors (Hass) (English)
Rikka's circle of friends. Namiko has the tendency to tease Yūta and Rikka together, while Hass is frequently seen with a flu mask and is also a YouTuber by the name Hassun (はっすん).
Sakiru Tonkawa (問川 さきる, Tonkawa Sakiru), Hikari Toida (Toiko) (戸井田 光（といこ）, Toida Hikari (Toiko)), Rika Kenamura (Kenachan) (毛苗村 里香（けなちゃん）, Kenamura Rika (Kenachan)), Hako Doi (土居 ハコ, Doi Hako) and Nana Takara (Seven) (高良 奈々（せぶん）, Takara Nana (Sebun))
Voiced by: Kaede Yuasa (Sakiru), Riho Iida (Toiko) and Rin Miyazaki (Kenachan) (Japanese); Dani Chambers (Sakiru) and Jad Saxton (Toiko) (English)
The Tsutsujidai High School volleyball team led by Sakiru. After she accidentally ruined Akane's Special Dog that was meant for Yuta, the monster Ghoulghilas killed Sakiru and the entire team. Following its destruction by Gridman, the damage was reversed but their deaths were covered up as having happened in an "accident" during their middle school years.
Sakiru's father operates a Chinese family restaurant named Dragon Emperor (竜帝, Ryūtei).
Ramo Marusa (Marusan) (丸佐 蘭萌（まるさん）, Marusa Ramo (Marusan)) and Ako Furuma (古間 亜子, Furuma Ako)
Voiced by: Akira Sekine (Marusan), Kanako Miyamoto (Ako) (Japanese); Macy Anne Johnson (Marusan), Felecia Angelle (Ako) (English)
Akane's circle of friends.

=== Fujiyokidai High School ===
Mei Kadoi (角井 鳴衣, Kadoi Mei)
Voiced by: Azusa Tadokoro (Japanese); Emily Neves (English)
Yume's sole friend in school.
Awaki (淡木), Ren Nazumi (Nazumi) (泥 蓮（なずみ）, Nazumi Ren (Nazumi)), Ranka (らんか) and Kaneishi (金石)
Voiced by: Jin Ogasawara, Gakuto Kajiwara, Rio Tsuchiya and Hikaru Tono (Japanese); Zach Bolton, Mark Allen, Jr., AmaLee and Jenny Yokobori (English)
Yomogi's circle of friends in his class.

=== Other characters ===
Orie Takarada (宝多 織江, Takarada Orie) (Note: Her true name is revealed in the Blu-Ray covers, while in the anime, she is credited as Rikka's Mother (六花ママ, Rikka Mama).)
Voiced by: Mayumi Shintani (Japanese); Anastasia Muñoz (English)
Rikka's mother, who runs a junk shop.
Electron Animal Anosillus (電子アニマル アノシラス, Denshi Animaru Anoshirasu)
A reptilian Kaiju able to convert the noises it absorbs into music, whom Gridman saved while it was corrupted during the events of Gridman the Hyper Agent. It was last seen observing Anosillus the 2nd nursing Anti to health.
Inamoto-san (稲本さん, Inamoto-san)
Voiced by: Mariya Ise (Japanese); Elizabeth Maxwell (English)
Yomogi's co-worker in his part-time job. Inamoto-san was once Koyomi's crush during their school years, until an incident involving her led him to become a shut-in that he is today.
Kano Minami (南 香乃, Minami Kano)
Voiced by: Iori Saeki (Japanese); Caitlin Glass (English)
Yume's sister, she died during the former's childhood.
