= List of kaiju anime =

This is a list of kaiju anime, original video animations (OVAs), original net animations (ONAs), and films.

Anime, Manga, Original Video Animations(OVA) , Original Net Animations (ONA), and Films
Name	Year	Creator(s)	Original medium	Adaptation(s)	Description	Ref(s)
Ambassador Magma	1965	Osamu Tezuka	manga	OVA, television drama		
Attack on Titan	2009	Hajime Isayama	manga	anime, novels, live-action films, video games		
Cencoroll	2009	Atsuya Uki	film			
Chibi Godzilla Raids Again	2023	Chiharu Sakazaki	anime			
Chibikko Kaiju Yadamon	1967	Ushio Souji	anime	manga		
Dai-Guard	1999	Fumihiko Shimo	anime			
Darling in the Franxx	2018	Code:000, Atsushi Nishigori, Naotaka Hayashi	anime	manga		
Deca-Dence	2020	Takuya Tsunoki, Shō Tanaka, Yuzuru Tachikawa, Hiroshi Seko	anime		Gadoll	
Diebuster	2004	Gainax, Kazuya Tsurumaki	OVA	manga	Space Monsters or Uchuu Kaijuu	
Digimon	1997	Bandai	toys	anime, manga, video games		
Dinosaur War Izenborg	1977	Keiichi Abe	anime		intelligent dinosaurs	
Gamera Rebirth	2023	Kadokawa Corporation	ONA	manga		
GeGeGe no Kitarō	1960	Shigeru Mizuki	manga	anime, live-action film	daikaiju, creatures of Japanese mythology and folkloric creatures from other countries	
Go! Go! Loser Ranger!	2021	Negi Haruba	manga	anime		
Godannar	2003	Hiroyuki Kawasaki	anime	video game	Mimetic beasts	
God Eater (TV series)	2010	Namco Bandai Games	video game	anime	Aragami	
Godzilla Singular Point	2021	Toh EnJoe	anime			
Godzilla: City on the Edge of Battle	2018	Gen Urobuchi, Sadayuki Murai, Tetsuya Yamada	anime			
Godzilla: Planet of the Monsters	2017	Gen Urobuchi	anime			
Godzilla: The Planet Eater	2018	Gen Urobuchi	anime			
Gridman Universe	2023	Keiichi Hasegawa	anime			
Gunbuster	1988	Toshio Okada	OVA	manga	Space Monsters or Uchuu Kaijuu	
Gurren Laggan	2007	Kazuki Nakashima	anime	manga, light novel, video game		
Howl from Beyond the Fog	2019	Daisuke Satō	short story	anime, live-action film	monster called Nebula	
I'm Home! Chibi Godzilla	2020	Chiharu Sakazaki, helo.inc	anime			
Kaiju Girl Caramelise	2018	Spica Aoki	manga	anime		
Kaiju Girls	2016	Minoru Ashina	ONA			
Kaiju Girls Black	2018	Kento Shimoyama	anime			
Kaiju No. 8	2020	Naoya Matsumoto	manga	anime, light novel		
Kaijuu Sekai Seifuku	2020		web manga	ONA		
The King Kong Show	1966		live-action film	anime		produced in Japan for an American company
Knight's & Magic	2010	Hisago Amazake-no	light novel	anime, manga	Demon Beasts	
Knights Of Sidonia	2009	Tsutomu Nihei	manga	anime		
Magical Girl Spec-Ops Asuka	2015	Makoto Fukami, Seigo Tokiya	manga	anime	Disas	
Mushibugyo	2009	Hiroshi Fukuda	manga	anime, video game	giant insects known as "Mushi"	
Nausicaä of the Valley of the Wind	1982	Hayao Miyazaki	manga	anime	giant mutant insects	
Neon Genesis Evangelion	1995	Gainax	anime		giant mutant insects	
One Punch Man	2009	One	webcomic	anime, manga		
Orient	2018	Shinobu Ohtaka	manga	anime	Kishin - kaiju-like monsters	
Pacific Rim: The Black	2021	Greg Johnson, Craig Kyle, Paul Giacoppo, Nicole Dubuc	ONA			
Rage of Bahamut	2011	Cygames	TCG	anime	dragon Bahamut	
Snowball Earth	2021	Yuhiro Tsujitsugu	manga	anime		
SSSS.Dynazenon	2021	Tsuburaya Productions, Keiichi Hasegawa	anime			
SSSS.Gridman	2018	Tsuburaya Productions, Keiichi Hasegawa	anime			
Terra Formars	2011	Yū Sasuga, Kenichi Tachibana	manga	anime	giant mutated humanoid cockroaches	
To The Abandoned Sacred Beasts	2014	Maybe	manga	anime	Incarnates - soldiers who can transform into giant mythical beasts	
The Ultraman (1979)	1979	Tsuburaya Productions	anime			
Ultraman	2011	Eiichi Shimizu, Tomohiro Shimoguchi	manga	anime	giant aliens	
Ultraman: Rising	2024	Tsuburaya Productions, Netflix	anime			
Zoids: Chaotic Century	1983	Takara Tomy	toys	anime	Zoids, short for Zoic Androids, are large bio-mechanical creatures	
