= List of Gridman the Hyper Agent characters =

The characters in this list are from the 1993–1994 tokusatsu series Denkou Choujin Gridman.

== Main characters ==
=== Naoto Sho ===
Naoto Sho (翔 直人, Shō Naoto), a kind-hearted boy who loves computers, is the main protagonist of the series. After the attacks by Kahn Digifer begin to occur, he is contacted by Gridman and merges with him to fight against Kahn and Takeshi's monsters. Using the wrist-worn Acceptor (アクセプター, Akuseputā), Naoto slams his fist on a special button of the Acceptor (accompanied by using the call "Access Flash (アクセスフラッシュ, Akusesu Furasshu)!") so that he transforms into a special suit that allows him to enter the Computer World and merge with Gridman.

Naoto Sho is portrayed by Masaya Obi (小尾 昌也, Obi Masaya).

=== Yuka Inoue ===
Yuka Inoue (井上 ゆか, Inoue Yuka) is a young girl who excels in studies and programs. She helps maintain Junk and provides the team spirit and constantly encourages her friends to do their best. Despite being the target of Takeshi's one-sided crush, Yuka developed feelings for Naoto.

Yuka Inoue is portrayed by Jun Hattori (服部 ジュン, Hattori Jun).

=== Ippei Baba ===
Ippei Baba (馬場 一平, Baba Ippei) is Naoto's other friend. Cheerful, he also helps monitor the computer when Naoto/Gridman fights. When Junk was first brought online, he used the painting program to design a superhero that would eventually become Gridman's body. With his skills as an artist, he would develop various Assist Weapons for Gridman's use.

Ippei Baba is portrayed by Takeshi Sudo (須藤 丈士, Sudō Takeshi).

=== Junk ===
Junk (ジャンク, Janku) is a homebuilt computer built from used computers and other junk. Whenever Gridman fights in a gigantic form, this would risk Junk from overloading.

Junk is voiced by Junko Shimakata (嶋方 淳子, Shimakata Junko).

=== Takeshi Todo ===
Takeshi Todo (藤堂 武史, Todō Takeshi) is classmate of Naoto and his friends who spent most of his free time in an eerie room with his personal computer. As his parents were away, this formed his behavior towards one that is introvert and self-centered, causing Kahn Digifier to take interest in him. In every episodes, Takeshi would create monsters based on daily frustrations, mostly for getting revenge on misfortune, petty grudges, or punishing humanity. Takeshi also develops an unhealthy crush on Yuka, having some of his creations targeted her specifically. After Naoto saved him from Kahn, Takeshi developed Grid Hyper Beam, which was used to decimate both Kahn and his home's computer.

22 years later in the event anime Denkou Choujin Gridman: boys invent great heroes, Takeshi bonds with Gridman Sigma, transforming with the Acceptor to fight against real life monsters.

Takeshi Todo is portrayed by Tsuyoshi Sugawara (菅原 剛, Sugawara Tsuyoshi) and is voiced by Kōichi Yamadera (山寺 宏一, Yamadera Kōichi) in the event anime.

== Heroes ==
=== Gridman ===
Gridman (グリッドマン, Guriddoman) is a Hyper Agent (ハイパーエージェント, Haipā Ējento) of the alternate dimension Hyper World (ハイパーワールド, Haipā Wārudo). While tracking down Kahn Digifer he encounters Naoto and, seeing as Naoto had a good heart, chooses him to merge with whenever battle must be done within the Computer World (コンピュータワールド, Konpyūta Wārudo). To fight against larger monsters and resolve situations that are massive in size, Gridman receives the upgrade program P-L6806OX (the downside of this program is that it lasts for 10 minutes as it could overload Junk's system - when the power up begins to fade, a blue light on Gridman's head begins to blink as a warning) for the purpose of enlargement. Naoto, Yuuka, and Ippei usually socialize with Gridman over their computer by sending computer-written messages to him.

Lacking a physical body, he receives one based on Ippei's drawing of a superhero and can only move from Junk when the Access Code (アクセスコード, Akusesu Kōdo) "GRIDMAN" is entered. His left hand is armed with the Gran Acceptor (グランアクセプター, Guran Akuseputā), through which he can fire Spark Beam (スパークビーム, Supāku Bīmu), conjure the Grid Light Saber (グリッドライトセイバー, Guriddo Raito Seibā) energy sword and execute his finisher, Grid Beam (グリッドビーム, Guriddo Bīmu). Aside from that, he can perform the Super-Conductivity Kick (超電導キック, Chō-Dendō Kikku) (a flying kick) and its stronger variant, Neo Super-Conductivity Kick (ネオ超電導キック, Neo Chō-Dendō Kikku). The Fixer Beam (フィクサービーム, Fikusā Bīmu) from his chest repairs the damages done by monsters created by Takeshi and Kahn Digifier. In the series' finale, Gridman executes Grid Hyper Beam (グリッドハイパービーム, Guriddo Haipā Bīmu) which was created by Takeshi to put an end to Kahn and simultaneously destroy his personal computer.

Aside from that, Gridman can access different forms when several Assist Weapons form an exosuit:

- Combination Super God Thunder Gridman (合体超神サンダーグリッドマン, Gattai Chō Jin Sandā Guriddoman): The result of combination with God Zenon's components. Sacrificing his agility for brute strength, Gridman receives additional padding and armor that allows him to be impervious to attacks. The twin drills from his shoulders can be used as Drill Break (ドリルブレイク, Doriru Bureiku), while his main finishing move is Thunder Grid Beam (サンダーグリッドビーム, Sandā Guriddo Bīmu).
- Combination Dragon Emperor King Gridman (合体竜帝キンググリッドマン, Gattai Ryū Tei Kingu Guriddoman): The result of combination with King Jet. Whereas Thunder Gridman focuses on strength, King Gridman fights with full use of speed and agility. He is armed with a pair of King Grid Launcher (キンググリッドランチャー, Kingu Guriddo Ranchā) on his arms and has an oxygen filter that prevents suffocation from toxic gases. His main finishing move is the King Grid Beam (キンググリッドビーム, Kingu Guriddo Bīmu)

Gridman is voiced by Hikaru Midorikawa (緑川 光, Midorikawa Hikaru), and Masaya Obi (小尾 昌也, Obi Masaya) in Episode 30 when merged.

=== Assist Weapons ===
In order to assist Naoto and Gridman from the Computer World, Ippei and Yuka can manipulate the Assist Weapons to support Gridman. These programs were created by Ippei designing them before Gridman materializes the concepts with his powers. In order to deploy them towards Gridman, Ippei or/and Yuka would be required to type his/her/their name/names in the Access Code. When not in use, the Assist Weapons were stored in the Assist Weapon Selector (アシストウェポンセレクター, Ashisuto Uepon Serekutā) cache. In the series' final episode, Kahn Digifer's intrusion into Junk's Computer World causes all of the Assist Weapons to be destroyed. In Gridman the Hyper Agent: The Overlord's Counterattack photo novel, components of God Zenon and Dyna Dragon were restored for the battle against Neo Kahn Digifer and his monsters.

- Barrier Shield (バリアーシールド, Bariā Shīrudo): The first Assist Weapon to be made, it is durable enough to sustain most of the monster attacks with super high electromagnetic waves. Yuka creates this program based on the CG produced by Ippei under his hunger, with the Barrier Shield inspired by his desire for hot dog.
- Plasma Blade (プラズマブレード, Purazuma Burēdo): A sword (sheathed in the Barrier Shield) which utilizes the Plasma Wave (プラズマウェーブ, Purazuma Uēbu) to cut through monsters.
- Lightning Thunderbolt Sword Gridman Sword (電光雷撃剣グリッドマンソード, Denkō Raigeki Ken Guriddoman Sōdo): The combination of Plasma Blade and Barrier Shield, allowing Gridman to execute the Lightning Thunderbolt (ライトニング・サンダーボルト, Raitoningu Sandāboruto).
  - Thunder Axe (サンダーアックス, Sandā Akkusu): This combat axe is a reconfiguration of the Gridman Sword in which the Plasma Blade's blade section disappears and the Barrier Shield is instead serving as a blade section via closing in a butterfly-like fashion. The Barrier Shield closes into a blade-shaped handle when the Gridman Sword is formed, but when the Thunder Axe is formed, the Barrier Shield itself acts as a blade section.
- Combination Electric God God Zenon (合体電神ゴッドゼノン, Gattai Den Jin Goddo Zenon): The combination of Thunder Jet, Twin Driller and God Tank. Ippei receives the inspiration to create Gridman's first support robot based on his little sister, Kana's robot toy. By itself, God Zenon can perform God Breaker (ゴッドブレイカー, Goddo Bureikā) uppercut punch and God Punch (ゴッドパンチ, Goddo Panchi) rocket punch. God Zenon's components are:
  - Thunder Jet (サンダージェット, Sandā Jetto): A Mach-5 aircraft armed with Thunder Missiles. Forms the upper body, arms and head of God Zenon or the torso and head of Thunder Gridman.
  - Twin Driller (ツインドリラー, Tsuin Dorirā): A two-drill tank armed with Twin Lasers. Forms the lower torso of God Zenon or Thunder Gridman's forearms and shoulder armors.
  - God Tank (ゴッドタンク, Goddo Tanku): An armored, tracked vehicle armed with God Cannon. Forms the legs of either God Zenon or Thunder Gridman.
- Super Dragon Combination Dyna Dragon (超竜合体ダイナドラゴン, Chō Ryū Gattai Daina Doragon) is a tyrannosaurus formed by Dyna Fighter and King Jet and fights with its burning Dragon Roar (ドラゴンロアー, Doragon Roā) breath. It is the robot form of Dyna Fighter and King Jet's combined form, Dragon Fortress (ドラゴンフォートレス, Doragon Fōtoresu) (a larger aircraft armed with Fortress Missiles) and Gridman's second support robot. It was created based on the excavated tyrannosaurus remains. After the King Gridman combination code is created, Dyna Dragon remains in this form instead of its original components:
  - Dyna Fighter (ダイナファイター, Daina Faitā): An aircraft armed with Dyna Missiles and Dyna Laser. It forms the head, central torso and tail of Dyna Dragon. It was originally the shoulder mounted Dragonic Cannon (ドラゴニックキャノン, Doragonikku Kyanon), created based on the design of Asian lung found in one of the remains of Chinese mummy. It unleashes the Dragon Fire (ドラゴンファイヤー, Doragon Faiyā) attack.
  - King Jet (キングジェット, Kingu Jetto): A larger aircraft created as a support for Dyna Fighter. Its main armaments are King Missiles and the King Laser. Despite the entire Dyna Dragon is needed to form King Gridman, only parts from the King Jet that were accommodated.

=== Gridman Sigma ===
Gridman Sigma (グリッドマンシグマ, Guriddoman Shiguma) is a Hyper World agent who is Gridman's successor and was originally planned to appear in a scrapped sequel of the television series. The character however appears in the event anime Denkou Choujin Gridman: boys invent great heroes, taking place where digital monsters that Takeshi and Kahn previously created were brought to life as illusions that wreak havoc upon the real world. Using the Acceptor, Takeshi transforms into Gridman Sigma as he faced against the monster threats.

== Antagonists ==
=== Kahn Digifier ===
Dark Lord Kahn Digifier (魔王カーンデジファー, Ma Ō Kān Dejifā) is the series' main antagonist. The dark lord of the Hyper World, he escapes to the Computer World and prepares to conquer Earth. Putting Takeshi Todo as his servant, he uses him to create monsters which he brings to life in order for them to attack the Computer World. He later upgrades himself into Gigantic Kahn Digifer (巨大カーンデジファー, Kyodai Kān Dejifā) for his final battle with Gridman, most of the Assist Weapons and overwhelming him. Kahn Digifer is ultimately destroyed by the Grid Hyper Beam.

Aside from the ability to create monsters, Khan Digifier's gigantic form can launch Elimination Ray Digifier Beam (破壊光線デジファービーム, Hakai Kōsen Dejifā Bīmu) and summons the Dark Lord Sword Digifier Sword (魔王剣デジファーソード, Ma Ō Ken Dejifā Sōdo).

Kahn Digifer is voiced by Masaharu Sato (佐藤 正治, Satō Masaharu).

=== Monsters ===
Most are virus monsters created by Takeshi and brought to life by Kahn Digifier to act under his bidding, serving their creator's petty grudges to the catastrophic extremes that Kahn Digifer intends to have an effect on the human world.

- Crystal Monster Gilarus (結晶怪獣 ギラルス, Kesshō Kaijū Girarusu; 1): A dinosaur-like monster with a diamond-covered back, Gilarus was originally designed by Takeshi as part of his monster design programming. When Kahn introduced himself, Takeshi decided to go along with the dark ruler's plan and sent Gilarus to the Inoue Hospital as a revenge for Yuka turning down his love letter. It crashed the hospital's computer system and caused havoc in the operating room where Daichi was undergoing surgery at, until Gridman interfered with the process. Gilarus became Gridman's first kill and undo the damages on the hotel's computer system, allowing Daichi's operation to continue unharmed.
  - Mecha Gilarus (メカギラルス, Meka Girarusu; 14): Gilarus' data was upgraded and redesigned by Takeshi with body armor and steel claws, and was used to tamper with time all around the world and the internal clocks of every human; Yuka and Naoto were in the basement at the time and therefore were unaffected. The upgraded monster was destroyed by Thunder Gridman's Thunder Grid Beam.
- Elastic Monster Bamora (弾力怪獣 バモラ, Danryoku Kaijū Bamora; 2): An orange dinosaur-like monster with six long spike-like appendages. Instead of being driven by Takeshi's grudge, it was created by Kahn when the boy was under his brainwashing. Rampaging in an information center's mainframe, sealing Gridman off, Bamora creates a satellite tower that could tear a hole into reality. But Gridman manages to keep Bamora from leaving the Computer World once the portal opened and deletes it with his Grid Beam.
  - Mecha Bamora (メカバモラ, Meka Bamora; 16): Bamora's data is later upgraded with armor and a mace on both its left hand and tail, used by Takeshi to get revenge on the police by disabling police communications and jail cells. Though it overpowered Gridman, Bamora is destroyed by Thunder Gridman.
- Volcano Monster Volcadon (火山怪獣 ボルカドン, Kazan Kaijū Borukadon; 3): A turtle-like quadruped virus with two volcano holes built into its shell that launch powerful fireballs. Volcadon was created to disrupt cell phone frequencies due to Takeshi becoming fed up with his parents' constant phone calls. It was destroyed by Gridman.
- Stealth Monster Stealgan (透明怪獣 ステルガン, Tōmei Kaijū Suterugan; 4): A blue Pterodactylus-like virus that can turn invisible. It was created by Takeshi when a genius creator named Hosono challenged the monsters' constant hacking incidents with his modernized car, sending said vehicle into a rampage in the streets. Though Stealgan overwhelmed Gridman, Yuka sends him a paint program to disable Stealgan's cloaking so he can blast the virus' wings off and finally destroyed it with the Grid Beam.
  - Mecha Stealgan (メカステルガン, Meka Suterugan; 20): Stealgan's data was upgraded by Takeshi to get even with a CG art company and stealing color from the city. It was destroyed by Gridman after the Dina Fighter and the King Jet disable its cloaking.
- Tearing Sword Monster Bagira (裂刀怪獣 バギラ, Retsu Tō Kaijū Bagira; 5): An aardvark/dinosaur monster with a long-horned nose and blades on each of its arms. In the beginning of the episode, Takeshi was humiliated when a delivery man with fruit crashed into him. As revenge, Takeshi created Bagira to shut down and lock up all the food plants in the city. The sudden food shortage was causing mayhem among housewives and Ippei's hunger was getting troublesome. Unlike previous monsters, Bagira had a major advantage with its blades and was able to deflect Gridman's fireballs and even the Grid Beam. Ippei quickly constructed the Barrier Shield to even the battle; the Barrier Shield's shape and design was inspired by a special hotdog Ippei had been craving. Using his new sword, Gridman severed Bagira's arms, but Takeshi withdrew Bagira from battle.
  - Re-Bagira (改造バギラ, Kaizō Bagira; 6): After repairing Bagira with new pair of arms, Takeshi sent it to the Sakuragaoka music shop after causing a ruckus earlier. Despite its intention to create a terrifying music, Bagira was killed by Anosillus in the keyboard's computer world.
  - Mecha Bagira (メカバギラ, Meka Bagira; 18): Takeshi upgraded Bagira's data, transforming it into Mecha Bagira and used it to reanimate an ancient cadaver that was discovered by a research facility. The corpse went on a rampage throughout the facility and went after Yuka, Daichi, and Kanna, who were visiting at the time. Mecha Bagira's new arsenal included a boomerang on its tail and a robotic eye that allowed Mecha Bagira to target and aim its weapon with accuracy. To win the battle, Gridman used the flamethrower attack from Ippei's new Dragonic Cannon followed by the Grid Beam.
- Electron Animal Anosillus (電子アニマル アノシラス, Denshi Animaru Anoshirasu; 6): A hunchbacked reptilian creature with a neck frill and two long spikes on its shoulders that resides within a digital piano. Alongside a Compoid named Unison, Anosillus converts the noises it absorbs into music. But Takeshi uses a melody infused with Kahn Digifer's power to corrupt Anosillus into Soundwave Monster Anosillus (音波怪獣アノシラス, Onpa Kaijū Anoshirasu), who begins produces ear-piercing sound waves from the keyboard that slowly spread throughout Sakuragaoka. Unison convinces Gridman to destroy Anosillus, able to restore Anosillus with Yuka's help. Anosillus makes a cameo appearance in the SSSS.Gridman series finale.
  - Super Soundwave Monster Imit Anosillus (超音波怪獣ニセアノシラス, Chō Onpa Kaijū Nise Anoshirasu; 17): A replica of Anosillus' corrupted form which Takeshi created, given the added ability to encase Gridman in circuit chips. Starting at his feet, Gridman's speed and mobility were greatly diminished. By the time the chips covered his lower half, all Gridman could do was helplessly swing his sword. Unfortunately, God Zenon did not fair any better as the clone blasted both God Zenon's arms off, forcing the robot to withdraw from the battle. Yuka uploaded a program that freed Gridman from the chips, and Imit Anosillus was destroyed by Gridman's Grid Beam as the monster was tossed in midair.
- Flame Monster Flamelar (火炎怪獣フレムラー, Kaen Kaijū Furemurā; 7, 8 & 19): A red dinosaur-like fire virus, it was created by Takeshi to exact revenge, blaming Yuka for his inappropriate timing to give his love letter. Flamelar was sent into Yuka's microwave to overheat its generator into a timebomb when Kahn was convinced said device would reveal his identity. With only three minutes left on the microwave's timer, Gridman made haste to stop Flamelar before Yuka can be killed in the explosion. Using the Plasma Sword, Gridman severed Flamelar's tail and head, but Khan Digifer recalled the monster before it could be destroyed. With the Fixer Beam, Gridman cooled the microwave's generator. Flamerlar returned and this time was sent into Yuka's air conditioner, heating her home at an unbearable temperature. The monster teamed up with Blizzalar to battle Gridman. But it was by turning the two monsters against with each other that Gridman defeated them with his Gridman Sword.
  - Mecha Flamelar (メカフレムラー, Meka Furemurā; 19): An upgraded version of Flamelar. After designs of Takeshi's monsters were confiscated by a policewoman due to his act of voyeurism, Takeshi sent Mecha Flamelar into the salon blowdryer to kill said officer and protect his secret. Mecha Flamelar's fire breath was stronger and its armor could emit jets of hot steam. Instead of bad hair days, Mecha Flamelar was overheating the salon's equipment that would eventually kill the customers. Ippei modified the Dragonic Cannon into the DinaFighter and blasted missiles at Mecha Flamelar's mouth, destroying its flame power. The monster was destroyed by Gridman's Grid Beam, while Takeshi's monster sketches were unknowingly disposed in a trashcan.
- Cold-Frost Monster Blizzalar (冷凍怪獣ブリザラー, Reitō Kaijū Burizarā; 8): A blue dinosaur-like ice virus with ice breath and able to shoot ice missile from its fingers, it was created as an older brother to Flamelar and the pair were sent to hack various air conditioners. After setting Ippei's house at sub-zero levels, Blizzalar did the same to Naoto's house where Daichi was restrained. During the battle by Khan Digifer's orders, Flamelar joined its brother, but Gridman was able to turn the two monsters against each others. Blizzalar was then destroyed by Gridman's Gridman Sword.
- Ninja Monster Shinobilar (忍者怪獣シノビラー, Ninja Kaijū Shinobirā; 9): A ninja virus with Auto Intelligence; in his first appearance, Shinobilar can shoot sparks, carry two katanas, and create multiple illusion clones of himself. His mission was to brainwash the students and faculty at Takeshi's cram school after he received a failing grade. Some of the students were classmates with Naoto and the gang, when Ippei and Yuka noticed their aggressive behavior, they went to the cram school only to chased away by the enslaved students. Shinobilar had Gridman at his mercy with his clone technique; but Gridman was able to claim victory by hurling the Thunder Axe the real Shinobilar. He is voiced by Nobuhiko Kazama (風間 信彦, Kazama Nobuhiko).
  - Ninja Monster Shinobilar (Revived) (忍者怪獣シノビラー（再生）, Ninja Kaijū Shinobirā (Saisei); 15): Shinobilar's data was reformed, given the ability to initiate Cicada Technique (空蝉の術, Utsusemi no Jutsu) and Fire Release Technique (火遁の術, Katon no Jutsu) and wields a kusarigama. This time, Takeshi was playing a virtual shooting game, but was taking too long that the arcade staff forced him off. Angered, Takeshi used Shinobilar to infect the game. The headset took over the player's mind and turned the virtual gun into a real lasergun. Yuka was the unfortunate player; under Shinobilar's control, she went around town shooting everything in sight. The battle seem too easy for Gridman at first, but Shinobilar revealed his ability to make himself incorporeal; all Gridman's attacks passed right through the ninja. After Twin Drill broke Shinobilar's weapon, Thunder Gridman was formed and performed the Thunder Grid Beam. He is voiced by Hisao Egawa (江川 央生, Egawa Hisao).
  - Kung Fu Shinobilar (カンフーシノビラー, Kan Fū Shinobirā; 29): An upgraded version of Shinobilar, armed with a nunchaku that can transform into a bō. Its additional abilities are Shinobilar Fist: Explosive Light Wave Bullet (シノビラー拳・爆裂光波弾, Shinobirā Ken: Bakuretsu Kō Ha Dan) and Shinobilar Hiding in the Dust Technique (シノビラー微塵隠れの術, Shinobirā Mijingakure no Jutsu). He fell to Gridman's King Grid Beam. He is voiced by Hisao Egawa.
- Subterranean Monster Terragaia (地底怪獣テラガイヤー, Chitei Kaijū Teragaiyā; 10): A Hercules beetle/dinosaur-like beast that walked on four legs and sprayed white acidic gas from its mouth. Angered by the foul taste in the park's water dispenser, Takeshi had Terragaia go into a city water plant to turn the water supply into hydrochloric acid. With its gas, Terragaia could melt circuit panels and burrow underground in the computer world. However, Gridman walked into a trap when he entered the plant's computers. His ankles were shackled and was being asphyxiated by Terragaia's gas. Luckily, Ippei had finished designing Thunder Jet and Twin Driller; using the new mecha, Twin Driller broke the shackles and Thunder Jet used the Thunder Ring to muzzle Terragaia. Unable to spray its gas, Terragaia was destroyed by Gridman's Grid Beam.
- Steel Monster Metallus (鋼鉄怪獣メタラス, Kōtetsu Kaijū Metarasu; 11): A metal virus with a bladed left arm and a pincer right arm. On its chest was a red jewel that unleashed a barrier when attacked by beam weapons. After being sent into the city's cash registers, Metallus gave anyone with a credit card 100,000 yen. With their newfound wealth, everyone went on major shopping sprees, especially Daichi. However, little did the populace know, they were actually playing Takeshi's "Shopping Game of Terror" (恐怖の買い物ゲーム, Kyōfu no Kaimono Gēmu). Whenever a credit card reached zero yen, the register that scanned it would detonate. In battle, Gridman was severely damaged when Metallus reflected his own beam fire back at him. Using the new God Tank, God Tank's cannons blasted the red jewel on Metallus, disabling its barrier. Without the protection of the barrier, Metallus was destroyed by Gridman's Grid Beam. Daichi left his parents with 100,000 yen bills to pay.
  - Super Steel Monster Neo Metallus (超鋼鉄怪獣ネオメタラス, Chō Kōtetsu Kaijū Neo Metarasu; 22): An upgraded version of Metallus with a blue jewel on its chest and able fire Metallus Beam (メタラスビーム, Metarasu Bīmu) from its mouth to stun Gridman. Neo Metallus took control of a computer operated backhoe at a dinosaur excavation site and caused the machine to run out of control. Drawing inspiration from dinosaurs, Ippei converted the Dragon Fortress in the Dina Dragon to help the losing Gridman. Neo Metallus was destroyed by the Grid Beam just before the backhoe could destroy the dinosaur bones.
- Magnetic Monster Magnegauss (磁力怪獣マグネガウス, Jiryoku Kaijū Magunegausu; 12): A quadrupedal reptilian-like monster covered with magnetic plates with two tails. From its shoulders were two appendages that fired flashes of blinding light. When Marty initiated multiple burglaries just to commercialize his home security system at a convenient time, Takeshi discover the scam earlier and sent Magnegauss to infect the Cat Eye System, trapping their users in their homes. Gridman could not defeat the monster alone; Magnegauss used its magnetic powers to deflect many of Gridman's attacks and drain his power as well. Ippei modified the vehicles to combine into God Zenon giving Gridman the chance to use the Grid Beam to destroy Magnegauss.
- Electricity Monster Generadon (電気怪獣ジェネレドン, Denki Kaijū Jeneredon; 13): A spike-adorned dinosaur-like monster that can shake and tremble itself wildly, creating tremors within the computer world. Generadon was sent into a local gym, causing the computerized gym equipment to run wild. Takeshi's intended target was a muscled athlete, but instead put Soichiro, Hideyo, and Hiroshi through a deadly workout. In battle, Gridman could not keep his balance due to Generadon's trembling; like recent monsters, Generadon could also syphon Gridman's energy. With Ippei's quick thinking, God Zenon was modified to form Thunder Gridman and destroyed the monster with the Drill Break.
  - Assassination Monster Mecha Generadon (暗殺怪獣メカジェネレドン, Ansatsu Kaijū Meka Jeneredon; 23): An upgraded version of Generadon. It was given power sucking armor but could no longer tremble. Mecha Generadon was put into the city's power plant to cut off the electricity. Prior to the battle, Naoto had injured his arm while testing Ippei's electricity generating bicycle. The injury affected Gridman's performance and Mecha Generadon kept biting and attacking Gridman's injured arm. Meanwhile, Ippei had to keep the basement sustained with power by pedaling his bike while Yuka assisted Gridman with Dina Dragon. Mecha Generadon was destroyed by the Grid Beam.
- Illusion Monster Dazzlba (幻覚怪獣ダズルバ, Genkaku Kaijū Dazuruba; 21): A silver stag beetle/dinosaur-like monster with jagged fangs and two long powerful tentacles for arms. The monster could also emit disorienting waves from its mouth. Takeshi had awoken from a nightmare about Gridman; he then saw an advert for a new electronic pillow and implanted Dazzlba into the device so others would suffer from nightmares too. Coincidentally, the gang's families all purchased these pillows and were thrust into a dream world. In the dream world, they were greeted by clowns handling out flyers announcing the execution of Gridman! Meanwhile, the real Gridman was able to awaken the trio from their dream state and combat Dazzlba. With help of Dragon Fortress, Dazzlba was destroyed by Gridman's Grid Beam.
- Plant Monster Plandon (植物怪獣プランドン, Shokubutsu Kaijū Purandon; 24): A pinkish-colored plant/dinosaur monster with leaf veins patterned throughout its body. Plandon was sent into a greenhouse that was conducting experiments on flowers. The flowers were altered and began spraying deadly pollen that was spreading throughout the city. With Dina Dragon holding the monster at bay, Gridman destroyed Plandon with Grid Light Saber, slicing the beast into four pieces.
- Poison Gas Monster Venora (毒煙怪獣ベノラ, Dokuen Kaijū Benora; 25 & 26): A monster with spikes on its back, porcupine spines on its belly, and four channels at the base of its neck that sprayed white smoke. Angered by air pollution, Takeshi used Venora to take control of a factory to pollute the city with smog. To add insult to injury, the battle was broadcast in the sky for the world to see. Even with Dina Dragon's help on the battlefield, Gridman was overtaken by Venora's smoke and passed out, ending the episode in a cliffhanger. Venora was destroyed in the following episode by King Gridman's King Grid Beam.
- Radio Wave Monster Boranga (電波怪獣ボランガ, Denpa Kaijū Boranga; 27): A robotic dinosaur-like monster. Destroyed by King Gridman's King Grid Beam.
- Glancing Monster Eyegangar (盗視怪獣アイガンガー, Tōshi Kaijū Aigangā; 28): A rehashed version of Magnegauss with a chestplate and a camera head. Eyeganger was placed in Takeshi's camcorder which he used to kidnap Yuka. Using video editing software, he subjected her to his perverse fantasies. To cover Yuka's disappearance, Takeshi forged a videotape of Yuka bidding farewell to her friends and family. But Naoto and Ippei had their suspicions and quickly analyzed the tape and learned it was a fake. In battle with Eyegangar, the monster had the ability to increase its bodyheat, making it difficult for Gridman to attack. Ippei analyzed Eyegangar and learned its weak point was its camera head and used God Zenon to destroy it. Eyeganger was destroyed by Gridman's Grid Light Saber.
- Magical Super Beast Jubagon (魔力超獣ジュバゴン, Maryoku Chōjū Jubagon; 30): A dragon-like monster placed inside a fortune telling machine that altered people's personalities, and even turned Naoto into an insecure coward. Destroyed by Gridman's Neo Superconductivity Kick.
- Prank Monster Teleboze (いたずら怪獣テレボーズ, Itazura Kaijū Terebōzu; 31): Created by someone else instead of Takeshi, Teleboze is nothing more than a peach-colored, timid creature with a childish innocent. When Gridman stops it, the monster apologized for the rampage. However, Takeshi rewrites the Kaijuu's data, resulting with Teleboze becoming a mindless monster and had to deleted by King Gridman's King Grid Beam.
- Absorption Monster Gyurunba (吸引怪獣ギュルンバ, Kyūin Kaijū Gyurunba; 32): A dinosaur-like monster with a large mouth that has coils in it. He was placed in a robot vacuum cleaner to target people who littered in retaliation for stepping on a discarded gum. Gyurunba would control the vacuum cleaner into shrinking people and sucking them up. Destroyed by Thunder Gridman's Thunder Grid Beam.
- Grudge Demon Beast Chidogerah (怨念鬼獣チドゲラー, Onnen Ki Jū Chidogerā; 33): A Ceratopsian-headed dinosaur-type skeleton monster. Destroyed by Thunder Gridman's Thunder Grid Fire.
- Space-Time Demon Abumaru (時空魔人亜武丸, Ji-Kū Majin Abumaru; 34): An armored cycloptic virus. Destroyed by King Gridman's King Grid Fire.
- Delinquent Monster Goromaking (ツッパリ怪獣ゴロマキング, Tsuppari Kaijū Goromakingu; 35): A musical delinquent-themed dinosaur-like monster who can make anyone act like a punk. Next to Shinobilar, Goromaking is one of a few monsters to have dialogue and speak to Gridman. Destroyed by Thunder Gridman's Thunder Grid Beam.
- Tyrant Super Beast Devil Fazer (暴君超獣デビルフェイザー, Bōkun Chōjū Debiru Feizā; 36): A black dinosaur-like monster that was similar to Chidogerah. Destroyed by Gridman's Grid Beam.
- Venom Spider Super Beast Khan Giorgio (毒蜘蛛超獣カーンジョルジョ, Doku Gumo Chōjū Kān Jorujo; 37): A dinosaur/spider-like monster. Destroyed by King Gridman's King Grid Fire.
- Stench Monster Skubone (悪臭怪獣スカボーン, Akushū Kaijū Sukabōn; 38): A tall, black dinosaur-like virus had two tails from which he could emit deadly red smog from its tail. Destroyed by King Gridman's King Grid Beam.

== Other characters ==
- Daichi Sho (翔 大地, Shō Daichi): Naoto's younger brother. He is portrayed by Masahiro Iwaoka (岩岡 真裕, Iwaoka Masahiro).
- Kana Baba (馬場 カナ, Baba Kana): Ippei's younger sister. She is portrayed by Kanako Nakatake (中武 佳奈子, Nakatake Kanako).
- Soichiro Sho (翔 宗一郎, Shō Sōichirō): Naoto's father. He is portrayed by Edo Yamaguchi (エド 山口, Edo Yamaguchi).
- Michiko Sho (翔 道子, Shō Michiko): Naoto's mother. She is portrayed by Miru Hitotsuyanagi (一柳 みる, Hitotsuyanagi Miru).
- Hideyo Inoue (井上 英世, Inoue Hideyo): Yuka's father. He is portrayed by Naoya Ban (伴 直弥, Ban Naoya).
- Yoshie Inoue (井上 良枝, Inoue Yoshie): Yuka's mother. She is portrayed by Yumi Mitani (三谷 侑未, Mitani Yumi).
- Yoshihito Inoue (井上 良仁, Inoue Yoshihito): Yuka's elder brother. He is portrayed by Masakazu Arai (新井 昌和, Arai Masakazu).
- Hiroshi Baba (馬場 寛司, Baba Hiroshi): Ippei's father. He is portrayed by Goro Kataoka (片岡 五郎, Kataoka Gorō).
- Ayako Baba (馬場 彩子, Baba Ayako): Ippei's mother. She is portrayed by Yuko Tsuga (津賀 有子, Tsuga Yūko).
- Police Officer Koganemura (小金村巡査, Koganemura Junsa): The police officer of the town in which Naoto lives. He is portrayed by Shoichi Komatsu (小松 正一, Komatsu Shōichi).
- Police Officer Amagasaki (尼崎巡査, Amagasaki Junsa): The police officer who appeared instead of Koganemura. He is portrayed by Daisuke Itsumori (五森 大輔, Itsumori Daisuke).
- Mummy from 5000 Years Ago (5000年前のミイラ, Gosen-nen Mae no Miira): A Chinese mummy who was later revealed in the sequel series SSSS.Dynazenon as the remains of Gauma (ガウマ, Gauma), a Kaiju Eugenicist who died killing his former comrades when they turned on their country. Brought to the Sakuragaoka museum for display, the mummy was revived by Mecha Bagira when Kahn Digifer sensed his lingering resentment. The mummy went on a rampage while mistaking Yuka for the princess he swore loyalty and love towards before returning to his slumber when Gridman destroyed Mecha Bagira.
