= The Lenticulars =

Japanese original net animation series

- Key visual

ザ・レンチキュラーズ (Za Renchikyurāzu)
- Created by: Studio Trigger
- Original net animation

The Lenticulars a/
- Directed by: Akira Amemiya
- Written by: Akira Amemiya
- Music by: Rikiya Okada
- Studio: Studio Trigger
- Released: October 31, 2025 – December 19, 2025
- Runtime: 5–6 minutes
- Episodes: 8
- Anime film

The Lenticulars a/b
- Directed by: Akira Amemiya
- Written by: Akira Amemiya
- Music by: Rikiya Okada
- Studio: Studio Trigger
- Released: April 24, 2026
- Runtime: 59 minutes

The Lenticulars (ザ・レンチキュラーズ, Za Renchikyurāzu) is a Japanese original net animation (ONA) series produced and animated by Studio Trigger. It is directed and written by Akira Amemiya, with Amemiya also serving as character designer and Rikiya Okada of 24chocolate composing the music. The series began releasing on YouTube on October 31, 2025. The theme song is "The Lenticulars" written and composed by Kōsuke Hayashi and performed by Scenarioart.

The series consists of eight "a/" episodes and eight "/b" episodes, with only the "a/" episodes being released on YouTube. A compilation film titled "The Lenticulars a/b", which includes the previously unreleased "/b" episodes, was released for a limited one week screening at Uplink Kichijoji, starting from April 24, 2026.

== Characters ==
Rakkun
Voiced by: Manato Ōkawara
Sawaki-san
Voiced by: Uta Aihara
Miike
Voiced by: Yū Nishizawa
Dony
Voiced by: Keigo Moriura
Sudako
Voiced by: Maina Kotori

== Episodes ==
No.	Title	Original release date
1 a/	"Work Gloves are Gloves" (軍手が手袋)	October 31, 2025
2 a/	"The End Is The Beginning" (終わりが始まり)	November 7, 2025
3 a/	"Warmth in One Hand" (片手があったかい)	November 14, 2025
4 a/	"Your Kindness Cuts In Too Deep" (お世話が抉る)	November 21, 2025
5 a/	"Can't Stand Myself" (自分が嫌)	November 28, 2025
6 a/	"Distortion Emerges" (歪みが生じる)	December 5, 2025
7 a/	"Contradiction Is What Makes Us Human" (矛盾が人間)	December 12, 2025
8 a/	"Something About Spring..." (春が......)	December 19, 2025
