= Gridman the Hyper Agent =

1993–1994 Japanese tokusatsu "Giant Hero" series

- Denkou Choujin Gridman
- Genre: Tokusatsu; Mecha; Superhero; Sci-Fi Action; Kyodai Hero
- Developed by: Naoyuki Edo; Yasushi Hirano
- Directed by: Kimiyoshi Soga
- Starring: Masaya Obi; Jun Hattori; Takeshi Sudo; Tsuyoshi Sugawara
- Voices of: Hikaru Midorikawa
- Narrated by: Yuji Machi
- Composer: Osamu Totsuka
- Country of origin: Japan
- Original language: Japanese
- No. of episodes: 39

Production
- Producers: Kazuo Tsubaraya; Nobuyuki Oyama; Hiroshi Inoue
- Running time: 24 minutes
- Production companies: Tsuburaya Productions; TBS

Original release
- Network: JNN (TBS)
- Release: April 3, 1993 – January 8, 1994

Related
- Superhuman Samurai Syber-Squad; SSSS.Gridman

Denkou Choujin Gridman (電光超人グリッドマン, Denkō Chōjin Guriddoman; lit. Lightning Superhuman Gridman), known as Gridman the Hyper Agent in some English-speaking territories, is a 1993–1994 Japanese tokusatsu "Giant Hero" series created by Tsuburaya Productions (the producers of Ultraman) and would be Tsuburaya's last non-Ultra superhero production before Bio Planet WoO. It was the inspiration and source material for DiC Entertainment's Superhuman Samurai Syber-Squad.

Shot on live video, Gridman was the first series by Tsuburaya Productions to utilize D-2 digital video for its special effects scenes, allowing for smoother slow-motion photography. Tsuburaya, having switched to digital techniques since then, would continue to use D-2 for all future productions.

The series was released in the United States with subtitles in English on the television network TOKU on December 18, 2017. The series was also made available on Toku's streaming service and on its Amazon Prime channel.

On October 30, 2020, the series began streaming episodes weekly on Tsuburaya's Ultraman Official YouTube channel to mark the second anniversary of SSSS.Gridman. Episodes are released each Friday at 6:30pm JST and have English subtitles available. Two weeks after the premiere date of each episode, the episode is removed from the channel. Mill Creek Entertainment released the complete series on Blu-ray for the first time in North America on August 17, 2021.

== Story ==
Three computer-savvy kids—Naoto, Yuka and Ippei—create their own video game superhero, but then discover it's possessed by an inter-dimensional police officer named Gridman. Pursuing an evil program called Khan Digifer, he merges with Naoto and fights Khan Digifer's digitized monsters (created by social misfit Takeshi) in order to prevent the computerized demon from wreaking havoc on the town of Sakuragaoka and the entire Human World.

== Episodes ==
1. The Birth of a New Hero! (新世紀ヒーロー誕生!, Shinseiki Hīrō Tanjō!)
2. The Secrets of Acceptor (アクセプターの秘密, Akuseputā no Himitsu)
3. Imminent Telephone Panic (電話パニック危機一髪, Denwa Panikku Kikiippatsu)
4. A Runaway Car (暴走自動車, Bōsō Jidōsha)
5. The Perfect Sword with a Man's Pride (男の意地の必殺剣!, Otoko no Iji no Hissatsuken!)
6. A Terror Melody (恐怖のメロディ, Kyōfu no Merodī)
7. Zero Seconds to Microwave Oven Explosion (電子レンジ爆発0秒前, Denshi Renji Bakuhatsu Zero-byō Mae)
8. Brother's Bond (兄弟の絆, Kyōdai no Kizuna)
9. Operation Evil Brainwashing (悪魔の洗脳作戦, Akuma no Sen'nō Sakusen)
10. The Dangerous Gift (危険な贈り物, Kiken na Okurimono)
11. Is My Allowance ¥100,000? (おこづかいは十万円?, Okozukai wa Jūmanen?)
12. Beware of The Phantom Thief Marty (怪盗マティに御用心!, Kaitō Mati ni Goyōjin!)
13. I Hate Sports (スポーツなんか大嫌い, Supōtsu nanka Daikirai)
14. Manipulated Time (あやつられた時間, Ayatsurareta Jikan)
15. The Distorted Target (歪んだターゲット, Yuganda Tāgetto)
16. Ippei is Scared!? (一平、チビる!?, Ippei, Chibiru!?)
17. A Lonely Hacker (孤独なハッカー, Kodoku na Hakkā)
18. The Legend of Dragon (竜の伝説, Ryū no Densetsu)
19. A Sexy Policewoman in Trouble (セクシー婦警SOS!, Sekushī Fukei Esu Ō Esu!)
20. Colors Disappear from the Planet of Earth?! (地球から色が消える?!, Chikyū kara Iro ga Kieru?!)
21. The Execution, My Hero! (処刑!! 夢のヒーロー, Shokei!! Yume no Hīrō)
22. Revival! Dinosaur King (復活! 恐竜帝王, Fukkatsu! Kyōryū Teiō)
23. An Assassination! A Thunderclap in Hell (暗殺! 地獄の雷鳴, Ansatsu! Jigoku no Raimei)
24. My Love! Bio-Flower (恋! バイオフラワー, Koi! Baio Furawā)
25. The Decisive Battle! The End of the Hero (Part 1) (決戦! ヒーローの最期 (前編), Kessen! Hīrō no Saigo (Zenpen))
26. The Decisive Battle! The End of the Hero (Part 2) (決戦! ヒーローの最期 (後編), Kessen! Hīrō no Saigo (Kōhen))
27. Big Surprise! A Toy Rebellion (驚天! オモチャの反乱, Kyōten! Omocha no Hanran)
28. Yuka Vanished!! (神かくし! ゆかが消えた!!, Kamikakushi! Yuka ga Kieta!!)
29. A Pet Dog Bomb Operation (愛犬爆弾計画, Aiken Bakudan Keikaku)
30. The Day of the World Destruction (世界滅亡の日, Sekai Metsubō no Hi)
31. The Monster's Mother is a College Girl (怪獣ママは女子大生, Kaijū Mama wa Joshidaisei)
32. Attack of a Human Vacuum Cleaner (人間掃除機の襲撃!, Ningen Sōjiki no Shūgeki)
33. Another Takeshi (もうひとりの武史, Mō Hitori no Takeshi)
34. A Body Guard (ボディガード弁慶参上!, Bodīgādo Benkei Sanjō!)
35. Yuka Becomes Delinquent (ぎくっ! スケバンゆか!?, Giku! Sukeban Yuka!?)
36. A Baby Given A Birth (やったぜ! ベイビィ, Yatta ze! Beibi)
37. What? Is Daddy Executed? (えっ! パパが死刑?, E! Papa ga Shikei?)
38. The Earth in Danger (危うし地球!, Ayaushi Chikyū)
39. Goodbye Gridman (さらばグリッドマン, Saraba Guriddoman)

== Cast ==
- Naoto Sho (翔 直人, Shō Naoto): Masaya Obi (小尾 昌也, Obi Masaya)
- Yuka Inoue (井上 ゆか, Inoue Yuka): Jun Hattori (服部 ジュン, Hattori Jun)
- Ippei Baba (馬場 一平, Baba Ippei): Takeshi Sudo (須藤 丈士, Sudō Takeshi)
- Gridman (グリッドマン, Guriddoman; Voice): Hikaru Midorikawa (緑川 光, Midorikawa Hikaru)
- Junk (ジャンク, Janku; Voice): Junko Shimakata (嶋方 淳子, Shimakata Junko)
- Daichi Sho (翔 大地, Shō Daichi): Masahiro Iwaoka (岩岡 真裕, Iwaoka Masahiro)
- Kana Baba (馬場 カナ, Baba Kana): Kanako Nakatake (中武 佳奈子, Nakatake Kanako)
- Soichiro Sho (翔 宗一郎, Shō Sōichirō): Edo Yamaguchi (エド 山口, Edo Yamaguchi)
- Michiko Sho (翔 道子, Shō Michiko): Miru Hitotsuyanagi (一柳 みる, Hitotsuyanagi Miru)
- Hideyo Inoue (井上 英世, Inoue Hideyo): Daisuke Ban (伴 大介, Ban Daisuke) (Played as Naoya Ban (伴 直弥, Ban Naoya))
- Yoshie Inoue (井上 良枝, Inoue Yoshie): Yumi Mitani (三谷 侑未, Mitani Yumi)
- Yoshihito Inoue (井上 良仁, Inoue Yoshihito): Masakazu Arai (あらい 正和, Arai Masakazu) (Played as "新井 昌和")
- Hiroshi Baba (馬場 寛司, Baba Hiroshi): Goro Kataoka (片岡 五郎, Kataoka Gorō)
- Ayako Baba (馬場 彩子, Baba Ayako): Yuko Tsuga (津賀 有子, Tsuga Yūko)
- Police Officer Koganemura (小金村 巡査, Koganemura Junsa): Shoichi Komatsu (小松 正一, Komatsu Shōichi)
- Police Officer Amagasaki (尼崎 巡査, Amagasaki Junsa): Daisuke Itsumori (五森 大輔, Itsumori Daisuke)
- Takeshi Todo (藤堂 武史, Todō Takeshi): Tsuyoshi Sugawara (菅原 剛, Sugawara Tsuyoshi)
- Khan Digifer (カーンデジファー, Kān Dejifā; Voice): Masaharu Sato (佐藤 正治, Satō Masaharu)
- Narrator (ナレーター, Narētā): Yuji Machi (真地 勇志, Machi Yūji)

== Other media ==
=== Superhuman Samurai Syber-Squad ===
Airing from September 1994 to April 1995 in syndication, Superhuman Samurai Syber-Squad was an American adaption of Gridman produced by Tsuburaya, Ultracom (Tsuburaya's American division), and DiC Entertainment. It starred Matthew Lawrence as Sam Collins/Servo, Glen Beaudin as Malcolm Frink, Troy Slaten as Amp Ere, Kevin Castro as Tanker, Robin Mary Florence as Sydney Forrester, Rembrandt Sabelis as Lucky London, Jayme Betcher as Jennifer Doyle, John Wesley as Principal Pratchert, Diana Bellamy as Rimba Starkey, Kelli Kirkland as Yolanda Pratchert, and Tim Curry as the voice of Kilokahn. The story revolves around a rock band named Team Samurai, led by Collins, that fights evil Mega Virus monsters created by Malcolm Frink and brought to life by Kilokahn in the Digital World. Due to direct involvement from Tsuburaya, unlike most adaptions of Tokusatsu programs from that time period, Superhuman Samurai Syber-Squad remained largely faithful to its source material and retained elements from Gridman including sound effects, character traits and arcs, plot points, and certain names.

=== Denkou Choujin Gridman: boys invent great hero ===
In 2015, the series inspired an animated short directed by Akira Amemiya and produced by Studio Trigger for the Japan Animator Expo. Entitled, Denkou Choujin Gridman: boys invent great hero (電光超人グリッドマン boys invent great hero, Denkō Chōjin Guriddoman Boizu Inbento Gurēto Hīrō; Lightning Superman Gridman: boys invent great hero), it debuted on January 16, 2015. It features the return of Takeshi Todo and the brief appearance of Gridman Sigma (グリッドマンシグマ, Guriddoman Shiguma), another Hyper Agent like Gridman who has never made it to the show's final cut.

The entire short took place in 22 years after Gridman's final battle with Khan Digifer. Takeshi Todo, a former brainwashed servant of Khan, reflects on the past incidents as monster attacks took place in real life. Using the Acceptor, he transforms into Gridman Sigma before facing the monster.

=== Gridman Universe ===
During Anime Expo 2017, Akira Amemiya, Studio Trigger and Tsuburaya announced SSSS.GRIDMAN, a brand new original anime series incorporating elements from both the original Gridman and its western adaptation, which aired in 2018. It is followed by a 2021 sequel called SSSS.Dynazenon with a crossover film, Gridman Universe , released in 2023. Hikaru Midorikawa reprises his role as Gridman for both the first anime and the crossover film.

== Songs ==
Opening theme

- "Yume no Hero" (夢のヒーロー, Yume no Hīro; "Dream Hero")
  - Lyrics: Akira Ōtsu
  - Composition: Kisaburo Suzuki
  - Arrangement: Masaki Iwamoto
  - Artist: Norio Sakai
  - The piano version of "Yume no Hero" made its appearance in the sixth episode of SSSS.Gridman.

Ending theme

- "Motto Kimi o Shireba" (もっと君を知れば; "If I Get to Know About You More")
  - Lyrics: Akira Ōtsu
  - Composition: Kisaburo Suzuki
  - Arrangement: Masaki Iwamoto
  - Artist: Norio Sakai

Insert song

- "Futatsu no Yūki" (ふたつの勇気; "Two Courages")
  - Lyrics: Atsushi Aida
  - Composition & Arrangement: Osamu Totsuka
  - Artist: Compoid Three
  - The karaoke version of "Futatsu no Yūki" made its appearance in the fourth episode of SSSS.Gridman.
