= Keiichi Hasegawa =

Japanese screenwriter

- 長谷川 圭一
- Born: February 1, 1962 (age 64); Atami, Shizuoka Prefecture, Japan
- Occupation: Screenwriter
- Writing career
- Language: Japanese
- Period: 1997–present
- Genres: Tokusatsu; anime; horror
- Notable works: Ultra Series; Kamen Rider; Rage of Bahamut; SSSS.Gridman

Keiichi Hasegawa (長谷川 圭一, Hasegawa Keiichi; born February 1, 1962) is a Japanese screenwriter from Atami, Japan.

== Biography ==
After graduating from Nihon University's Art Department with a degree in film studies, Hasegawa made his debut as an assistant director with the unreleased film Kuchita Teoshiguruma. After participating in the later half of the series Taiyō ni Hoero!, he moved to the art department to work on props and decorations, and participated in many films, including Gamera: Guardian of the Universe and Gamera 2: Attack of Legion.

Hasegawa began writing for television in the 1990s and has been a writer for almost every Ultraman series produced since Tiga up to the first season of Ginga. Since first beginning his work on the Ultraman franchise with the 1996 series Ultraman Tiga, Hasegawa has gone on to write more material for the franchise than any other writer. He has been directly involved with the creation of every title Ultraman character up to Mebius as well as having had a major role in selecting actors for the roles.

Hasegawa has been lauded in the field of tokusatsu writing for his dramatic shifts in tone regarding the content of scripts. A 2004 issue of Hyper Hobby has credited him as the creator of the Tokusatsu Drama craze in where the narratives are portrayed in a style similar to J-Drama rather than traditional tokusatsu stories, which were called by the editor of the magazine as "shallow and unproductive" by the early 90s. In many interviews, Hasegawa has stated that he feels tokusatsu heroes should be somewhat tormented and have to rise above adversity. He feels this was portrayed in a very thin sense during the 70s and 80s and wanted to take that aspect of tokusatsu and make it a main attraction, rather than the action the tokusatsu is known for.

For Ultraman Nexus, which Hasegawa calls the project he has always wanted to do, he wanted to show the spirit of a grand being who has the ability to lift people out of the mundane aspects of life and even save certain characters from despair. Hasegawa has said that tokusatsu heroes can be just as important to adults as they are to children if written correctly.

== Screenwriting ==
- series head writer denoted in bold

=== Live action television ===
- Ultraman Tiga (1997)
- **Ultraman Dyna** (1997–1998):
- Ultraman Gaia (1998–1999)
- Ultraman Cosmos (2001)
- **Ultraman Nexus** (2004–2005)
- Ultraman Mebius (2006–2007)
- Cutie Honey: The Live (2007)
- Ultraseven X (2007)
- Ultra Galaxy Mega Monster Battle (2007–2008)
- Ultra Galaxy Mega Monster Battle: Never Ending Odyssey (2008–2009)
- Kamen Rider W (2009–2010)
- **Majisuka Gakuen 3rd Season** (2012)
- Kamen Rider Fourze (2012)
- **Ultraman Ginga** (2013)
- Kamen Rider Drive (2014–2015)
- AKB Horror Night: Adrenaline Night (2015–2016)
- Kamen Rider Ghost (2016)
- **Reima no Machi** (2017)
- Kamen Rider Saber (2020–2021)
- **Kamen Rider Gotchard** (2023–2024)
- No.1 Sentai Gozyuger (2025)

=== Anime television ===
- Devil Lady (1998–1999)
- The Big O (1999–2000)
- Zoids: Chaotic Century (1999–2000)
- Zoids: New Century Zero (2001)
- Kiko Senyo Rouran (2002–2003)
- Megaman NT Warrior (2002–2003)
- Astro Boy (2003–2004)
- Phoenix (2004)
- Gaiking: Legend of Daiku-Maryu (2005–2006)
- Happy Lucky Bikkuriman (2006–2007)
- **GeGeGe no Kitarō 5th series** (2007–2008): head writer (eps 1–26)
- Hakaba Kitarō (2008)
- Viper's Creed (2009)
- **Rage of Bahamut: Genesis** (2014)
- **SSSS.Gridman** (2018)
- GeGeGe no Kitarō 6th series (2019–2020)
- **SSSS.Dynazenon** (2021)

=== Live action films ===
- Ultraman Tiga & Ultraman Dyna: Warriors of the Star of Light (1998)
- Ultraman Tiga & Ultraman Dyna & Ultraman Gaia: Battle in Hyperspace (1999)
- Ultraman Tiga: The Final Odyssey (2000)
- Godzilla, Mothra and King Ghidorah: Giant Monsters All-Out Attack (2001)
- Ultraman Cosmos 2: The Blue Planet (2002)
- Ultraman Cosmos 2: The Blue Planet - Young Musashi Chapter (2002)
- Ultraman Cosmos vs. Ultraman Justice: The Final Battle (2003)
- ULTRAMAN (2004)
- Ultraman Mebius & Ultraman Brothers (2006)
- Superior Ultraman 8 Brothers (2008)
- Kamen Rider Accel (2011)
- Ultraman Saga (2012)
- My Future of Being Executed (2012)
- 009-1: The End of the Beginning (2013)
- Drive Saga: Kamen Rider Mach (2016)
- Kamen Rider Gotchard: The Future Daybreak (2024)

=== Anime film ===
- Gridman Universe (2023)
