= Yūya Hirose =

Japanese voice actor

- 広瀬 裕也
- Born: April 9, 1996 (age 30); Chiba Prefecture, Japan
- Occupation: Voice actor
- Years active: 2013–present
- Agent: Arts Vision
- Height: 173 cm (5 ft 8 in)

Yūya Hirose (広瀬 裕也, Hirose Yūya; born April 9, 1996) is a Japanese voice actor who is affiliated with Arts Vision. He voiced Junichi Aizawa in Handa-kun, Aki Kashii in Dynamic Chord, Yūta Hibiki in SSSS.Gridman, Takuma Akutsu in Val × Love, and Haruka Isumi in IDOLiSH7.

== Filmography ==
=== Anime ===
2013

- Chronicles of the Going Home Club as Lloyd Ando (episodes 8 and 9)

2015

- Go! Princess PreCure as Tennis club member
- Food Wars!: Shokugeki no Soma as Schoolboy B (episode 19)
- Aoharu × Machinegun as Gamer
- Chivalry of a Failed Knight as Student (episode 4)
- Star-Myu as Student

2016

- The Disastrous Life of Saiki K. as Baseball boy A (episode 21)
- Cheer Boys!! as Daichi Norita
- Handa-kun as Junichi Aizawa
- Dynamic Chord as Aki "Knight" Kashii

2017

- The Saga of Tanya the Evil as Klein Balhelm (episode 5)
- Fuuka as Schoolboy (episode 2)
- Interviews with Monster Girls as Schoolboy (episode 1)
- Tsuki ga Kirei as Shō Nagahara

2018

- SSSS.Gridman as Yūta Hibiki

2019

- O Maidens in Your Savage Season as Shun Amagiri
- Val × Love as Takuma Akutsu

2020

- Darwin's Game as Hamada
- Digimon Survive as Shuuji Kayama
- Carnelian Blood as Byakuya Amemiya

2021

- Tokyo Revengers as Takuya Yamamoto
- IDOLiSH7: Third Season as Haruka Isumi
- Deep Insanity: The Lost Child as Lawrence Larry Jackson
- Tsukipro the Animation 2 as Seiya

2022

- On Air Dekinai! as Chief AD Yokoyama
- 3-byo Ato, Yajū.: Gōkon de Suma ni Ita Kare wa Midara na Nikushoku Deshita as Yūto Azusawa (on-air version)
- Shoot! Goal to the Future as Tōya Nakano
- Vermeil in Gold as Alto Goldfield
- The Little Lies We All Tell as Hanzō

2023

- Tsurune: The Linking Shot as Tōma Higuchi

2024

- Chained Soldier as Yuuki Wakura
- Delicious in Dungeon as Holm
- I Was Reincarnated as the 7th Prince so I Can Take My Time Perfecting My Magical Ability as Dian
- Negative Positive Angler as Alua
- Rurouni Kenshin: Kyoto Disturbance as Seiku Arai

2025

- I'm a Noble on the Brink of Ruin, So I Might as Well Try Mastering Magic as Bruno
- Übel Blatt as Köinzell
- Inexpressive Kashiwada and Expressive Oota as Tadakoro-kun
- Li'l Miss Vampire Can't Suck Right as Satoru Deguchi

2026

- Kirio Fan Club as Mitsuru Manda
- Romelia War Chronicle as Henri Lleus Lionel
- Magical Sisters LuluttoLilly as Oleans
- Devils' Crest as Kenji Kondou

=== Anime films ===
2022

- Toku Touken Ranbu: Hanamaru ~Setsugetsuka~ as Kotegiri Gou

2023

- Gridman Universe as Yūta Hibiki

=== Video games ===
2017

- IDOLiSH7 as Haruka Isumi

2021

- Gate of Nightmares as Azel

2022

- Digimon Survive as Shuuji Kayama

2023

- Synduality as Alba Kuze
- Ys X: Nordics as Cruz Carpent
- Atelier Resleriana: Forgotten Alchemy & the Liberator of Polar Night as Roman

2025

- Code Geass: Lost Stories as Soma
- Dragon Nest as Artar (male)

2026

- Echoes of Aincrad as Zash

=== Drama CD ===
2021

- Fantastic Night as Kuon Kamizuki

=== Dubbing ===
- Dogman as Teenage Douglas
