= Promare =

2019 Japanese anime film by Hiroyuki Imaishi

- Theatrical release poster

Japanese name
- Kanji: プロメア
Transcriptions
- Revised Hepburn: Puromea
- Directed by: Hiroyuki Imaishi
- Screenplay by: Kazuki Nakashima
- Produced by: Keisuke Ukai
- Starring: Kenichi Matsuyama; Taichi Saotome; Masato Sakai
- Cinematography: Shinsuke Ikeda
- Edited by: Junichi Uematsu
- Music by: Hiroyuki Sawano
- Production companies: Trigger; XFLAG (production); Sanzigen (3DCG)
- Distributed by: Toho Animation
- Release dates: May 15, 2019 (Tokyo premiere); May 24, 2019 (general release)
- Running time: 112 minutes
- Country: Japan
- Language: Japanese
- Box office: ¥1.5 billion (Japan) $17 million (worldwide) (Note: Promare – $17,027,420: Japan – ¥1.5 billion ($13.8 million); US, Canada, France, Russia CIS, UK, Australia, New Zealand – $2,767,420; Taiwan – $460,000)

Promare (Japanese: プロメア, Hepburn: Puromea) is a 2019 Japanese animated science fiction action film co-produced by Trigger and XFLAG. It was directed by Hiroyuki Imaishi and written by Kazuki Nakashima. It features character and mecha designs by Shigeto Koyama, 3DCG animation by Sanzigen, and music by Hiroyuki Sawano. The film was released by Toho Animation in Japan on May 24, 2019. At the 2019 Annecy International Animation Film Festival, it was selected as one of the ten films. It was nominated for Best Animated Feature — Independent at the 47th Annie Awards, but lost to Jérémy Clapin's I Lost My Body.

== Plot ==
During a catastrophe known as the Great World Blaze, mass spontaneous human combustions caused fires that killed half the world's population. During and after the event, some humans developed pyrokinetic abilities and became known as the Burnish. Thirty years later, Galo Thymos is a resident of the city of Promepolis and a member of the firefighting group Burning Rescue, which responds to incidents involving the Mad Burnish, a group of radical Burnish accused of being terrorists. As Galo defeats the Mad Burnish, including their leader, Lio Fotia, the Freeze Force, a police force owned by the city's governor, Kray Foresight, arrests them. However, Lio and the other prisoners break free and escape to a cave near a frozen lake, where Galo witnesses Lio failing to revive a mortally injured Burnish using a mouth-to-mouth flame transfer technique. Before they escape, Lio tells Galo that Kray is capturing Burnish for human experimentation, which shocks Galo, who worships Kray after he saved him from a fire several years ago.

Galo confronts Kray, who informs him that Earth will soon be destroyed by an uncontrollable surge of magma from its core and that the Burnish's abilities can be used to create a warp drive, which he intends to use to flee Earth with a select portion of humanity. Galo opposes this plan, but is arrested for treason. Meanwhile, Freeze Force manages to track down and recapture all of the Burnish population except for Lio, whom his companions send into a nearby volcano. Enraged by the mistreatment of his people, Lio unleashes his hatred and transforms into a giant flaming dragon that burns down the city with the intent of confronting Kray. Galo escapes from prison and intervenes with the help of Burning Rescue, restraining and cooling Lio enough for Galo's colleague, Aina Ardebit, to send them to the frozen lake.

The flames melt the ice, revealing a laboratory run by a holographic projection of Deus Prometh, a scientist whom Kray killed. He explains that the Burnish can communicate with the Promare, a race of interdimensional flame beings who came to reside in Earth's core after a dimensional rift opened shortly before the Great World Blaze. They have a natural desire to burn, which the Burnish have inherited. The surging magma is a side effect of subjecting the Promare to pain, and Kray's experiments on the Burnish using incomplete, stolen technology are accelerating its growth. He also reveals that the collective agony caused by the Promare-powered warp drive will lead to Earth's destruction.

In a mecha of Deus' design called Deus X Machina, Galo and Lio return to Promepolis to confront Kray. In the ensuing battle, the ship and warp drive are seemingly destroyed. Kray reveals that he is a Burnish and that he indirectly started the fire he rescued Galo from, using publicity from the event to launch his political career. He also recommended that Galo join Burning Rescue in the hopes that he would be killed on the job. Kray seemingly kills Galo and takes Lio to use him to power the warp drive, but Lio's flame saves Galo. Using a drill Prometh designed, Galo reaches the ship's core in time and defeats Kray using Lio's flame. While Lio is nearly killed due to the warp drive, Galo revives him using the mouth-to-mouth technique.

After fusing with Earth's core, Lio convinces Galo to combine the drive with the mecha to protect life on Earth. The Promare envelop the surface, allowing them to burn completely and harmlessly and satisfying their natural urge, causing the rift in the core to close. The Burnish become normal humans, and Galo and Lio resolve to rebuild the world together.

== Voice cast ==
Character
Character	Japanese	English
Galo Thymos (ガロ・ティモス, Garo Timosu)	Kenichi Matsuyama	Billy Kametz
A recently recruited member of Burning Rescue, who describes himself as having a "burning soul". After surviving a house fire as a child, he aims to save others from fire.
Lio Fotia (リオ・フォーティア, Rio Fōtia)	Taichi Saotome	Johnny Yong Bosch
The leading successor of the organization Mad Burnish. He risks his life to protect everyone and believes that the Burnish do not kill without reason.
Kray Foresight (クレイ・フォーサイト, Kurei Fōsaito)	Masato Sakai	Crispin Freeman
The commanding governor and founding leader of Promepolis. He orders human experiments on the Burnish and wants to be perceived as a hero by the general public.
Aina Ardebit (アイナ・アルデビット, Aina Arudebitto)	Ayane Sakura	Alyson Leigh Rosenfeld
A pilot of Burning Rescue and Galo's colleague. According to Heris, she was to be brought onto the Parnassus ship.
Remi Puguna (レミー・プグーナ, Remī Pugūna)	Hiroyuki Yoshino	Billy Bob Thompson
The vice-captain of Burning Rescue, who takes sense from Galo and Lucia.
Varys Truss (バリス・トラス, Barisu Torasu)	Tetsu Inada	John Eric Bentley
A muscular member of Burning Rescue, who often protects survivors. Like his co-workers, he can be critical of Galo.
Ignis Ex (イグニス・エクス, Igunisu Ekusu)	Rikiya Koyama	Steve Blum
The commander of Burning Rescue, who is effective in coordinating them during rescues and appears to have a negative history with Vulcan.
Lucia Fex (ルチア・フェックス, Ruchia Fekkusu)	Mayumi Shintani	Kari Wahlgren
A scientist of Burning Rescue and the creator of Galo's mecha, Matoi Tech. She dislikes being called a "mad scientist".
Vinny (ビニー, Binī)	Kendo Kobayashi	Michael Sinterniklaas
Lucia's rat and the mascot of Burning Rescue. He tends to be gluttonous.
Heris Ardebit (エリス・アルデビット, Erisu Arudebitto)	Ami Koshimizu	Erica Lindbeck
Aina's sister and Kray's assisting scientist.
Biar Colossus (ビアル・コロッサス, Biaru Korossasu)	Ryōka Yuzuki	Melissa Fahn
Kray's secretary assistant.
Vulcan Haestus (ヴァルカン・ヘイストス, Varukan Heisutosu)	Taiten Kusunoki	Neil Kaplan
The cyborg captain of Freeze Force, who is working with Kray to capture Burnish. His technology is implied to be from the Foresight Foundation.
Gueira (ゲーラ, Gēra)	Nobuyuki Hiyama	Matthew Mercer
Lio's first general. A Burnish whose fiery personality stands out compared to Lio and Meis.
Meis (メイス, Meisu)	Katsuyuki Konishi	Yuri Lowenthal
Lio's second general. Despite his cool demeanor, he goes along with the antics of his partners.
Deus Prometh (デウス・プロメス, Deusu Puromesu)	Arata Furuta	Mike Pollock
A researcher of phenomenon whom Kray killed. He later preserved his consciousness in an AI computer.

== Music ==
Promare Original Soundtrack

Soundtrack album by Hiroyuki Sawano
- Released: May 24, 2019
- Genre: Soundtrack
- Length: 1:15:26
- Label: Aniplex
- Producer: Hiroyuki Sawano

The film's theme songs, "Kakusei" (覚醒; lit. 'Awakening') and "Kōri ni Tojikomete" (氷に閉じこめて; lit. 'Imprisoned in Ice'), are performed by Superfly. The soundtrack is composed by Hiroyuki Sawano, with the album published by Aniplex on May 24, 2019.

All music is composed by Hiroyuki Sawano.

Promare Original Soundtrack
No.	Title	Lyrics	Performer(s)	Length
1.	"Inferno"	Benjamin Anderson; mpi	Benjamin Anderson; mpi	3:54
2.	"PRO//MARE"			3:47
3.	"GAL-OTHY-MOS"			5:09
4.	"ΛsHEs"	cAnON.	Gemie	2:21
5.	"WORLDBIGFLAMEUP"			4:27
6.	"PROMARETHEME"			3:18
7.	"BangBangBUR!...n?"			5:56
8.	"NEXUS"	Benjamin Anderson; mpi	Laco	3:49
9.	"BAR2tsuSH"			5:27
10.	"DeusPRO召す"			5:17
11.	"fanFAREpiZZA"			3:36
12.	"ΛsHEs ～RETURNS～"	cAnON.	Gemie	2:24
13.	"燃焼ING-RES9"			2:09
14.	"BAR2NG4女14yoN"			3:11
15.	"904SITE"			2:34
16.	"REG-GIRT"			2:27
17.	"RE:0"			2:38
18.	"PIROMARE"			2:20
19.	"Gallant Ones"	Benjamin Anderson; mpi	Benjamin Anderson; mpi	2:54
20.	"stRE:0ings"			2:27
21.	"火-YO!人"			5:21
Total length:				1:15:26

== Production ==
The film was announced at Anime Expo on July 2, 2017, as an original anime project co-produced by Trigger and XFLAG that has been in production for over four years, later revealed to be a film in October 2018. Hiroyuki Imaishi and Kazuki Nakashima worked together previously on Gurren Lagann and Kill la Kill. Nakashima and Trigger are credited for the original work, with Shigeto Koyama providing the character and mechanical designs, Sanzigen animating the 3DCG sequences, and Hiroyuki Sawano composing the music. The film's logo was designed by Saishi Ichiko and Tomotaka Kubo served as art director. Sushio, who designed the characters and served as chief animation director on Kill la Kill, was involved as one of the film's animators.

== Release ==
The film premiered in Japan on May 24, 2019. On June 13, 2019, GKIDS acquired the film for North American distribution, with showings occurring on September 17 and 19, 2019. It was dubbed into English by NYAV Post. The film was later released again with showings on December 8, 10, and 11, 2019, where it also aired a short prequel film Side: Galo. Another showing of the film in North America was expected to re-air April 7 and 8, 2020 with the two prequel films Side: Galo and Side: Lio, and a message from Imaishi. However, the third screening in North America was postponed during COVID-19 pandemic. It was later rescheduled to September 16 and 19, 2021, along with Takashi Yamazaki's Lupin III: The First. To promote the upcoming European release, Trigger partnered with Goodsmile Racing and Black Falcon team to field a Mercedes-AMG GT3 with Promare livery in the 2019 Spa 24 Hours endurance race. The car started on pole position and finished 3rd. In the United Kingdom and Ireland, Anime Limited acquired the film, and premiered it at Scotland Loves Anime in Glasgow on October 13, 2019, and a special screening in Edinburgh on October 19, 2019, with director Hiroyuki Imaishi, creative producer Hiromi Wakabayashi, and character designer Shigeto Koyama. In Australia and New Zealand Madman Entertainment premiered the film at Madman Anime Festival Melbourne on September 14, 2019.

=== Home media ===
The film was released in Japan on Blu-ray and DVD on February 5, 2020. Originally set for a May 5, 2020 digital home media release in North America, it was released by GKIDS and Shout! Factory digitally on April 21, 2020. A Blu-ray and DVD release followed on May 19, 2020.

== Reception ==
=== Box office ===
The film ranked at number 8 in the Japanese box office on opening weekend, grossing ¥41.4 million in its first three days. In its second weekend, the film dropped to number 10, grossing ¥58.8 million and a cumulative total of ¥231.3 million. In its third weekend, the film dropped out of the top 10 and accumulated ¥65.3 million. As of September 20, 2019, the film had grossed over ¥1.2 billion ($11.11 million). The film went on to gross ¥1.5 billion ($13.8 million) in Japan, becoming the 23rd highest-grossing Japanese film of 2019. It also grossed $2,313,186 in the United States and Canada, and $914,234 in other territories, for a worldwide total of $17 million.

=== Critical response ===
The review aggregator website Rotten Tomatoes reported that 97% of critics have given the film a positive review based on 29 reviews, with an average rating of 8/10. The site's critics consensus reads, "Visually dazzling and narratively exhilarating, Promare is a colorful thrill ride that should entertain adult anime enthusiasts as well as the teens in its target audience." On Metacritic, the film has a weighted average score of 77 out of 100 based on 8 critics, indicating "generally favorable reviews".

Matt Schley of The Japan Times gave the film 4 stars out of 5, praising the storytelling but having some criticism for elements of the transition between 2D and 3D animation.

Writing for Anime News Network, Kim Morrissy gave Promare a Grade A, comparing it to previous works by Gainax and Trigger such as Gurren Lagann and Kill la Kill. Morrissy claimed that: "Promare is a refinement of the Trigger formula to the point where I honestly believe it has outdone the classics that inspired it."

Gadget Tsūshin listed "Annihilation Beam", a phrase from the film, in their 2019 anime buzzwords list.

== Accolades ==
Year	Award	Category	Recipient	Result
2020	Mainichi Film Awards	Best Animation Film	Promare	Nominated
2020	Annie Awards	Best Animated Feature — Independent	Promare	Nominated
2020	Newtype Anime Awards	Best Work (Theatrical Screening)	Promare	Won
2020	Bucheon International Animation Film Festival	International Competition - Feature Film - Audience Prize	Promare	Won
