= Studio Trigger =

Japanese animation studio

Trigger, Inc.
- Native name: 株式会社トリガー
- Romanized name: Kabushiki-gaisha Torigā
- Type: Subsidiary
- Industry: Anime
- Predecessor: Gainax
- Founded: August 22, 2011; 15 years ago
- Founders: Hiroyuki Imaishi; Masahiko Otsuka
- Headquarters: Kichijōji, Musashino, Tokyo, Japan
- Key people: Masahiko Ōtsuka (Note: Co-founder, president, and CEO); Yoshiki Usa (Note: Executive vice president); Hiroyuki Imaishi (Note: Co-founder and board director); Kazuya Masumoto (Note: Board director)
- Parent: Ultra Super Pictures
- Subsidiaries: Trigger Dōga-bu (2013)
- Website: www.st-trigger.co.jp

Trigger, Inc. (Japanese: 株式会社トリガー, Hepburn: Kabushiki-gaisha Torigā; stylized in all caps), also known as Studio Trigger, is a Japanese animation studio founded by former Gainax employees Hiroyuki Imaishi and Masahiko Otsuka in 2011. It has produced anime works including Kill la Kill (2013), Little Witch Academia (short films, 2013 and 2015; TV series, 2017), Promare (2019), BNA: Brand New Animal (2020), Cyberpunk: Edgerunners (2022) and its sequel Cyberpunk: Edgerunners 2 (2026), and Delicious in Dungeon (2024), as well as the animated continuations of Gridman the Hyper Agent: SSSS.Gridman (2018), SSSS.Dynazenon (2021), and Gridman Universe (2023).

== History ==
Studio Trigger was founded by former Gainax employee Hiroyuki Imaishi, following his success with Gurren Lagann (2007). This led to the creation of Studio Trigger, with Gurren Lagann's visual humor and style defining the studio's work, and Trigger being seen as a successor to Gainax.

Studio Trigger was established on August 22, 2011, by Hiroyuki Imaishi and Masahiko Ōtsuka shortly after leaving Gainax. The studio name and official website was revealed in October 2011. The first animation they released was for the game Project X Zone. Along with assisting production on various series, Trigger released a short film, Little Witch Academia, and developed its first original anime television series, Kill la Kill, which aired from October 2013 to March 2014. On July 8, 2013, Trigger launched a Kickstarter project in order to fund a second episode of Little Witch Academia. The project was well received and achieved its goal of $150,000 in under five hours, and went on to raise a total of $625,518.

Studio Trigger, along with studios Sanzigen and Ordet, formed the joint holding company Ultra Super Pictures in 2011.

In 2018, Studio Trigger created a Patreon with the goal of acquiring necessary funding for projects and merchandise. As of February 2025, Studio Trigger's Patreon offers two support tiers for patrons (US$1/month and US$5/month), has over 6000 members, and raises over US$3,000 per month.

In 2023, Trigger announced it had acquired the rights to Panty & Stocking with Garterbelt and Gurren Lagann, and announced a follow-up series for Panty & Stocking and a North American re-screening of both Gurren Lagann films.

== Productions ==
=== Anime television series ===
Year	Title	Network	Director(s)	Eps.	Note(s)	Refs.
2013–2014	Kill la Kill	MBS	Hiroyuki Imaishi	24 +OVA	Original work.	
2014	When Supernatural Battles Became Commonplace	TV Tokyo	Masahiko Ōtsuka (chief); Masanori Takahashi	12	Based on a light novel by Kōta Nozomi.	
2016	Space Patrol Luluco	AT-X	Hiroyuki Imaishi	13	Original work.	
2016	Kiznaiver	BS11	Hiroshi Kobayashi	12	Original work.	
2017	Little Witch Academia	Tokyo MX	Yoh Yoshinari	25	Based on Trigger's short film of the same name. Released on Netflix.	
2018	Darling in the Franxx	Tokyo MX	Atsushi Nishigori	24	Original work. Co-production with CloverWorks and A-1 Pictures.	
2018	SSSS.Gridman	WOWOW	Akira Amemiya	12	Based on the tokusatsu series Gridman the Hyper Agent by Tsuburaya Productions.	
2020	BNA: Brand New Animal	+Ultra	Yoh Yoshinari	12	Original work.	
2021	SSSS.Dynazenon	Tokyo MX	Akira Amemiya	12	Studio's 10th anniversary project. Related to SSSS.Gridman.	
2024–present	Delicious in Dungeon	Tokyo MX	Yoshihiro Miyajima	24+	Based on a manga by Ryoko Kui.	
2025	New Panty & Stocking with Garterbelt	Tokyo MX / AT-X / BS NTV	Hiroyuki Imaishi	13	Second season revival based on the original series by predecessor studio Gainax. Released on Amazon Prime Video.	

=== Anime films ===
Year	Title	Director(s)	Dur.	Note(s)	Refs.
2013	Little Witch Academia	Yoh Yoshinari	30m	Original work. Produced for Anime Mirai 2013.	
2015	Little Witch Academia: The Enchanted Parade	Yoh Yoshinari	55m	Original work. Sequel to the first Little Witch Academia film.	
2019	Promare	Hiroyuki Imaishi	115m	Original work. CG animation produced by Sanzigen.	
2023	Gridman Universe	Akira Amemiya	118m	Crossover between SSSS.Gridman and SSSS.Dynazenon.	

=== Original net animations ===
Year	Title	Director(s)	Eps.	Note(s)	Refs.
2012–2013	Inferno Cop	Akira Amemiya	13	Original work. Released on YouTube.	
2013	Turning Girls	Masahiko Ōtsuka; Ren Shimorenjaku	7	Original work. Released on YouTube.	
2015	Japan Animator Expo	Akira Amemiya (#9); Yasuhiro Yoshiura (#11, #29); Hiroyuki Imaishi (#14)	—N/a	Four shorts: Electronic Superhuman Gridman: Boys Invent Great Hero (#9; based on Gridman the Hyper Agent), Power Plant No. 33 (#11; co-produced with Studio Rikka), Sex & Violence with Machspeed (#14), and Bureau of Proto Society (#29; co-produced with Studio Rikka).	
2015	Ninja Slayer From Animation	Akira Amemiya	26	Based on the novel series by Bradley Bond and Philip "Ninj@" Morzez. Released on Niconico.	
2021	Star Wars: Visions Volume 1	Hiroyuki Imaishi (#3); Masahiko Otsuka (#7)	—N/a	Episodes #3 ("The Twins") and #7 ("The Elder"). Co-production with Lucasfilm, released on Disney+.	
2022	Cyberpunk: Edgerunners	Hiroyuki Imaishi	10	Based on the video game Cyberpunk 2077 published by CD Projekt. Co-production with CD Projekt, released on Netflix.	
2025	Star Wars: Visions Volume 3	Masahiko Otsuka	—N/a	Episode #7 ("The Smuggler"). Co-production with Lucasfilm, released on Disney+.	
2025	The Lenticulars	Akira Amemiya	8	Original work. Released on YouTube.	
2026	Cyberpunk: Edgerunners 2	Kai Ikarashi	10	Stand-alone sequel to Cyberpunk: Edgerunners. Co-production with CD Projekt, released on Netflix.	

=== Other productions ===
- Project X Zone (2012; game) – Opening animation production
- Yonhyakunijuu Renpai Girl (2013; PV) – Promotional video for light novel published by Enterbrain
- Hacka Doll (2014; PV) – Promotional videos for mobile news app by DeNA
- Bishoujo Mobage: Mobami-chan (2014; PV) – Promotional video for mobile game by DeNA
- Black Dynamite (2014; TV) – Season 2 opening animation production; co-production with Sanzigen
- Hacka Doll the Animation (2015; TV) – Animation assistance
- Battlesaurs (2015; OVA) – Opening animation production
- Chunithm (2015; MV) – Music video animation production
- Fire Emblem Fates (2015; game) – Live2D illustrations
- Hyoketsu (2016; CM) – TV commercial animation production for beverage by Kirin Company
- Steven Universe (2016; TV) – Animation production assistance for S4E4, "Mindful Education"
- OK K.O.! Let's Be Heroes (2017; TV) – Opening animation production
- Little Witch Academia: Chamber of Time (2017; game) – Cutscene animation production
- Kill la Kill: The Game: IF (2019; game) – Development supervision
- Shantae and the Seven Sirens (2019; game) – Opening animation production
- Delicious in Dungeon (2019; PV) – Promotional video for manga published by Enterbrain
- Indivisible (2019; game) – Opening animation production; co-produced with Titmouse, Inc.
- Idolish7 (2020; MV) – Music video animation production
- Marble Knights (2020-23; game) – Opening animation production
- Metallic Child (2021; PV) – Promotional video for video game published by Crest
- Omega Strikers (2023; PV) – Promotional video for video game published by Odyssey Interactive
- "Chocolat Cadabra" (2024; MV) – Music video animation production
- Transformers 40th Anniversary Special Movie (2024; PV) - Promotional video for the 40th anniversary of the Transformers media franchise by Takara Tomy and Hasbro, with assistance from Production I.G., Madhouse, Studio Colorido, Studio Kai and Production +h
