= Junko Shimakata =

Japanese voice actress

Junko Shimakata (嶋方 淳子, Shimakata Junko; born August 12, 1967 in Kanagawa) is a Japanese voice actress who works for Aoni Production.

== Notable voice roles ==
=== Anime ===
- Kaka in Dragon Quest
- Kumomaru and Kirimaru in Anpanman
- Kiki in Beyblade
- Ichiro in Crayon Shin-chan
- Roboka and Chinchao in Doraemon
- Kaka in Dragon Quest
- Trigger in Kurogane Communication
- Toguru in Mushrambo (Shinzo)
- Shibuki in Nintama Rantarou
- Maruru and Misa in Nurse Angel Ririka SOS
- Nana Baruburan in Remi the Homeless Girl
- Carlo in Romeo no Aoi Sora
- An Ohara (31) and other additional voices in Sailor Moon
- Yu Yamanami in Soul Link

=== Games ===
- Kurreshes in Black Matrix
- Da Qiao and Xiao Qiao in the Dynasty Warriors series
- Sawtooth in the Wacky Races series (3DO Games)

=== Dubbing ===
- Patty in Practical Magic
