= SSSS.Gridman =

Japanese anime television series

- Key visual
- Genre: Adventure; Kaiju; Mecha
- Created by: Tsuburaya Productions
- Developed by: Keiichi Hasegawa
- Directed by: Akira Amemiya
- Voices of: Hikaru Midorikawa; Yume Miyamoto; Yūya Hirose; Reina Ueda; Sōma Saitō
- Music by: Shirō Sagisu
- Opening theme: "Union" by OxT
- Ending theme: "youthful beautiful" by Maaya Uchida
- Country of origin: Japan
- Original language: Japanese
- No. of seasons: 1
- No. of episodes: 12 (list of episodes)

Production
- Executive producers: Masahiro Onda (Tsuburaya Productions); Takahiro Sasaki (Pony Canyon)
- Producers: Miho Ichii; Tomoyuki Ōwada; Hiroshi Kamei; Sōji Miyagi; Hidehisa Nagasawa; Hirofumi Ishii; Mikio Ono; Yoshiki Usa; Yūki Watanabe; Tomoyoshi Asō
- Cinematography: Hisayoshi Yamamoto
- Animator: Trigger
- Editor: Masato Yoshitake
- Running time: 23 minutes
- Production companies: Tsuburaya Productions; MBS; BS11; Pony Canyon; The Klockworx Co., Ltd.

Original release
- Network: Wowow, Tokyo MX, MBS, BS11
- Release: October 7 – December 23, 2018

Related
- Gridman the Hyper Agent; SSSS.Dynazenon; Gridman Universe

SSSS.Gridman (stylized as SSSS.GRIDMΛN (Note: The "SSSS" in the title is an acronym for "Special Signature to Save a Soul" as revealed in the final episode. It is also a reference to Superhuman Samurai Syber-Squad, a US adaptation of Gridman the Hyper Agent, although it is not directly related to the series.)) is a Japanese anime television series jointly produced by Tsuburaya Productions and Trigger. It is the first installment in the shared Gridman Universe and an adaptation of the 1993–1994 tokusatsu series Denkou Choujin Gridman. It was broadcast for 12 episodes from October to December 2018. A sequel, titled SSSS.Dynazenon, was broadcast from April to June 2021.

== Synopsis ==
The story focuses on Yūta Hibiki, an amnesiac first-year high school student living in the fictional Japanese city of Tsutsujidai. He meets the Hyper Agent Gridman in an old computer, who states that the boy has a mission he must fulfill; Yūta sets out to find the meaning to those words and his memory loss. The sudden appearance of kaiju eventually changes the usual dynamics of Yūta and his classmates. Yūta is able to merge with Gridman to fight kaiju, but after the kaiju attack, people's memories are reset and those who die are forgotten. As the "Gridman Alliance", Yūta and his friends now seek to stop the kaiju and uncover the truth behind the disappearances, with assistance from mysterious friends of Gridman who can transform into weapons that Gridman can use in combat.

== Broadcast and release ==
SSSS.Gridman was announced during Studio Trigger's panel at Anime Expo 2017, alongside Darling in the Franxx and Promare. Trigger described the show as "their anime take on the tokusatsu series", with an original storyline unrelated to the earlier live-action series. During Tokyo Comic Con 2017, more details about the show were provided, including the main staff, October 2018 premiere, Masayuki Gotou as Gridman's character designer, and voice actor Hikaru Midorikawa reprising his role as Gridman.

On March 24, 2018, the official website revealed another visual and main voice cast details. During Studio Trigger's Anime Expo 2018 panel, Trigger acknowledged the differences between the US and Japanese releases of Gridman, clarifying that SSSS.Gridman is a new show with the same concept. They emphasized that despite having an all-new story, SSSS.Gridman wasn't a reboot. Production of SSSS.Gridman took place alongside Promare; staff related stories during the panel about production details for SSSS.Gridman being worked out during Promare meetings and vice versa. A special video featuring director Akira Amemiya was shown, emphasizing the story "would focus on the youth of Japan and their relationship to technology". The world premiere of the show took place after the panel ended.

The series aired from October 7 to December 23, 2018. (Note: Wowow lists the series as premiering at 24:00 on Saturday, which is effectively Sunday at 12:00 a.m. JST.) The series is directed by Akira Amemiya, written by Keiichi Hasegawa, and animated by Trigger. Masayuki Gotou designed Gridman with Masaru Sakamoto handling the other character designs, many of which are directly inspired by characters from the Transformers franchise. Shirō Sagisu composes the music. The opening theme is "UNION" by OxT, and the ending theme is "youthful beautiful" by Maaya Uchida. During their Anime Expo 2018 panel, Funimation announced they licensed the series for streaming on FunimationNow and an English dub. The anime was also licensed by Funimation in the United Kingdom, Ireland, South Africa, Australia, New Zealand, Denmark, Iceland, Norway and Sweden. The anime was simulcast by Crunchyroll in those countries.

On December 14, 2019, a sequel series titled SSSS.Dynazenon was announced at Tsuburaya Production's own convention, Tsubucon. The animation project is a continuation of SSSS.Gridman set in the same shared "Gridman Universe". It premiered on April 2, 2021.

On November 15, 2020, it was announced during an Adult Swim YouTube livestream panel that the anime's English dub would premiere on the network's Toonami programming block on January 17, 2021. (Note: Adult Swim lists the series as premiering at 2:30 a.m. (26:30) ET/PT on Saturday, which is effectively Sunday.)

A compilation film was released in cinema on January 20, 2023, before the premiere of Gridman Universe anime film.

=== Manga adaptations ===
On May 27, 2019, a manga adaptation and five manga spin-off adaptations were announced. The manga spin-offs announced were a comedy spin-off by Ariko, a spin-off centered around Samurai Calibur and a girl named Hime Kuzuki by Kei Toru, a then-untitled spin-off by Misaki Sano, a Sengoku-era spin-off by Yūki Tamura, and an untitled spin-off centered around Akane Shinjo by Shun Kazakami. The manga adaptation by Konno was serialized in Shueisha's Shōnen Jump+ website from November 30, 2019, to December 11, 2021. It has been collected in five tankōbon volumes.

On October 26, 2019, the two spin-off manga adaptations by Ariko and Kei Toru began serialization in Media Factory's seinen manga magazine Monthly Comic Alive. Shinseiki Chūgakusei Nikki ended serialization on October 27, 2020; Hime to Samurai ended on February 26, 2022.

On May 2, 2020, the two spin-off manga adaptations by Yūki Tamura and Misaki Sano began serialization in Akita Shoten's shōnen manga magazine Monthly Shōnen Champion. Both series ended serialization on April 6, 2021.

On July 9, 2020, the planned manga spin-off adaptation by Shun Kazakami was cancelled due to creative differences.

A manga spin-off written and illustrated by Hazumu Sazuka, titled Gridman Dogma, was serialized in Shinchosha's Kurage Bunch website from April 13, 2021, to April 26, 2022.
