= Gridman Universe =

2023 Japanese anime film

- Anime key visual.
- Directed by: Akira Amemiya
- Screenplay by: Keiichi Hasegawa
- Based on: SSSS.Gridman; SSSS.Dynazenon
- Starring: Hikaru Midorikawa; Yūya Hirose; Yume Miyamoto; Soma Saito; Junya Enoki; Shion Wakayama; Yūichirō Umehara; Chika Anzai
- Music by: Shirō Sagisu
- Production company: Trigger
- Distributed by: Toho Animation
- Release date: March 24, 2023
- Running time: 118 minutes
- Country: Japan
- Language: Japanese

Gridman Universe (Japanese: グリッドマン ユニバース) is a 2023 Japanese animated film produced by Studio Trigger. The anime film is set in the Gridman Universe that is originally created by Tsuburaya Productions, and features characters from SSSS.Gridman and SSSS.Dynazenon, also serving as an epilogue for both series. The film was released on March 24, 2023, by Toho Animation.

== Plot ==
After their world was saved by Gridman and Akane Shinjo returned to the real world, Yūta, Rikka, and Utsumi return to their normal lives, though Yūta still has to adjust to losing two months of his memories due to being possessed by Gridman during that time. Rikka and Utsumi work on writing a script for a play their class will perform in the upcoming school festival based on their experiences with Gridman, while Yūta tries to work up the courage to confess his feelings to Rikka. However, their life is disrupted when a kaiju suddenly attacks the city. Yūta voluntarily fuses with Gridman again to fight the kaiju, and is assisted by the return of the Neon Genesis Junior High Students, who now count a newly revived Gauma who commands DynaRex as their newest member. Gridman and the NGJHS defeat the kaiju, and explain that some unknown phenomenon is causing different universes to overlap in a potential Big Crunch.

The NGHJS decide to stick around to observe the situation in case more kaiju return, and Yūta starts to see what he believes are ghosts. As a result of the overlapping universes, Yomogi, Yume, Koyomi, and Chise are transported to Yūta's world. While they have a happy reunion with Gauma, they have no means of returning to their home universe. Instead, Yomogi and his friends decide to help Yūta, Rikka, and Utsumi with their play. Gauma manages to meet the Princess, who advises him to move on from his past and look to the future. However, Yūta begins to notice several inconsistencies with the world until a second kaiju attacks. Gridman, DynaRex, and the NGJHS engage the kaiju and are assisted with the arrival of Knight and the 2nd. The kaiju is defeated, but a second Gridknight suddenly appears and apparently destroys Gridman. With Gridman's destruction, the NGJHS, the Dynazenon crew, Knight, and the 2nd all disappear with the exception of Yomogi.

The younger versions of Knight and the 2nd then arrive, revealing that Gridman had actually unconsciously created multiple universes. Some unknown force is attacking Gridman's consciousness, which is causing the universes he created to overlap. Knight and the 2nd urge Yūta to combine with Gridman, as he is the only one who can break him free. Multiple Kaiju then attack, with Knight and Yomogi doing their best to hold them off. Yūta reaches Junk and connects with Gridman with assistance from Akane in the real world. Akane frees Alexis Kerib from confinement and takes remote control of him, attacking the mastermind behind the assault on Gridman's mind, Mad Origin. Mad Origin reveals he is an embodiment of chaos, the antithesis of Gridman who wants to steal his ability to create universes. Gridman regains control of himself and summons the Dynazenon crew, the NGJHS, Knight, and the 2nd to battle Mad Origin and with everybody working together, they are able to defeat him thanks to Alexis Kerib's sacrifice.

With the battle over and the universes saved, Yomogi and his friends are sent back to their home universe. Akane apologizes to Knight for her poor treatment of him before returning to the real world. Gridman and the NGJHS return to the Hyper World, with Gauma finally letting go of his feelings for the Princess. Yūta, Rikka, and Utsumi rewrite their play, titled "Gridman Universe", which proves to be a huge success. After the festival, Yūta finally confesses his feelings to Rikka, and she reciprocates. In the real world, Akane meets up with her friends to clean up a polluted riverbank.

== Voice cast ==
Character	Japanese
Gridman	Hikaru Midorikawa
Yūta Hibiki	Yūya Hirose
Rikka Takarada	Yume Miyamoto
Shō Utsumi	Soma Saito
Yomogi Asanaka	Junya Enoki
Yume Minami	Shion Wakayama
Koyomi Yamanaka	Yūichirō Umehara
Chise Asukagawa	Chika Anzai
Caliber	Ryōsuke Takahashi
Max	Katsuyuki Konishi
Borr	Aoi Yūki
Vit	Masaya Matsukaze
Rikka's mother	Mayumi Shintani
Knight	Kenichi Suzumura
The 2nd	Karin Takahashi
Namiko	Suzuko Mimori
Hassu	Akari Kitō
Rex	Daiki Hamano
Princess	Maaya Uchida
Akane Shinjō	Reina Ueda
Alexis Kerib	Tetsu Inada
Mad Origin	Nobutoshi Canna

== Production and release ==
The film was initially announced as the next Gridman Universe project following the first run end of SSSS.Dynazenon. In December 2021, Tsuburaya Productions and Studio Trigger revealed that the project would be an anime film. The film features returning staff, including director Akira Amemiya, scriptwriter Keiichi Hasegawa, character designer Masaru Sakamoto, and composer Shiro Sagisu, with Trigger, who produced the film's two pre-sequels, SSSS.Gridman in 2018 and SSSS.Dynazenon in 2021, remains to animate the film. The film premiered in Japan on March 24, 2023. Masayoshi Ōishi will perform the theme song "uni-verse". Prior to the premiere of the film, SSSS.Gridman and SSSS.Dynazenon would each receive a compilation film on January 20, 2023, and March 10, 2023, respectively.

== Reception ==
Gridman Universe released in 151 theatres on March 24, 2023, in Japan with ranked No. 5 in weekend box office (March 24–26, 2023). As per 'Filmarks' first day satisfaction ranking, it ranked second with average rating of 4.4/5.0 based on 726 reviews.
