= SSSS.Dynazenon =

Japanese anime television series

- Key visual
- Genre: Kaiju, mecha
- Based on: Gridman the Hyper Agent
- Developed by: Keiichi Hasegawa
- Directed by: Akira Amemiya
- Voices of: Daiki Hamano; Junya Enoki; Shion Wakayama; Yūichirō Umehara; Chika Anzai
- Music by: Shirō Sagisu
- Opening theme: "Imperfect" by Masayoshi Ōishi
- Ending theme: "Strobe Memory" by Maaya Uchida
- Country of origin: Japan
- Original language: Japanese
- No. of episodes: 12 (list of episodes)

Production
- Executive producer: Masahiro Onda
- Producers: Tomoyuki Oowada; Hiroshi Kamei; Naoki Koyama; Ichirou Ikeda; Hiro Tanaka
- Cinematography: Hisayoshi Yamamoto
- Animator: Trigger
- Editor: Masato Yoshitake
- Running time: 23 minutes
- Production companies: Pony Canyon; Tsuburaya Productions; BS11; Good Smile Company; Memory Tech Holdings; Good Smile Company; MBS

Original release
- Network: Tokyo MX, MBS, BS11
- Release: April 2 – June 18, 2021

Related
- Gridman the Hyper Agent; SSSS.Gridman; Gridman Universe

SSSS.Dynazenon (stylized as SSSS.DYNΛZENON (Note: The "SSSS" in the title is an acronym for "Special Signature to Save a Soul" as revealed in the final episode of SSSS.Gridman. It is also a reference to Superhuman Samurai Syber-Squad, a US adaptation of Gridman the Hyper Agent, although it is not directly related to the series.)) is a 2021 Japanese anime television series produced by Studio Trigger. It is the sequel to the 2018 anime SSSS.Gridman and the second installment in the shared Gridman Universe established in 2018 after the 1993–94 tokusatsu drama Gridman the Hyper Agent by Tsuburaya Productions. The 12-episode series aired in Japan from April to June 2021.

== Plot ==
Yomogi Asanaka is just an ordinary high school boy when he encounters a young man named Gauma, who claims he is a "Kaiju User". When the city is attacked by a Kaiju, Gauma summons the giant robot Dynazenon to battle it. Yomogi, his classmate Yume Minami, and local NEET Koyomi Yamanaka are caught up in the battle and end up becoming Gauma's copilots for Dynazenon. Together, they must uncover and put a stop to whatever is behind the Kaiju attacks.

== Production and release ==
The anime project was announced in December 2019 during Tsuburaya Productions' Tsubucon convention. At that time, original production staffs from SSSS.Gridman such as director Amemiya, writer Hasegawa, character designer Sakamoto and composer Sagisu were the ones announced to return to their old positions. Amemiya had hoped that the success of SSSS.Dynazenon would open new potential to other Gridman-related projects. The first five of the cast members were announced in May 2020, including the key visual of the main characters. The first teaser was aired in October 2020 to promote the initial cast members.

In December 2020, additional information were announced at the Tokyo Comicon 2020. Other than a few additions to the cast members, the titular mecha Dynazenon was designed by Tsuyoshi Nonaka and Takara Tomy finally return to participate in the Gridman franchise after Gridman the Hyper Agent back in 1993. The series aired from April 2 to June 18, 2021, on Tokyo MX, BS11, and MBS. The opening theme is "Imperfect" by Masayoshi Ōishi while the ending theme is "Strobe Memory" by Maaya Uchida.

Funimation licensed the series and is simulcasting on its website in North America, British Isles and Brazil, on AnimeLab in Australia and New Zealand, and on Wakanim in France, Germany, Russia and Scandinavia. Following Sony's acquisition of Crunchyroll, the series was moved to Crunchyroll.

A compilation film was released in cinema on March 10, 2023, before the premiere of Gridman Universe anime film.

== See also ==
- Superhuman Samurai Syber-Squad
