= List of Parker Lewis Can't Lose episodes =

This is a list of episodes for the American television program Parker Lewis Can't Lose.

== Series overview ==
Season	Episodes	Originally released	
Season	Episodes	First released	Last released
1	26	September 2, 1990	May 19, 1991
2	25	August 11, 1991	May 17, 1992
3	22	July 16, 1992	June 13, 1993

== Episodes ==
=== Season 1 (1990–91) ===
No. overall	No. in season	Title	Directed by	Written by	Original release date	Prod. code	Viewers (millions)
1	1	"Pilot"	Thom Eberhardt	Lon Diamond & Clyde Phillips	September 2, 1990	TBA	12.4
Introduces characters. Mikey splits with Parker after a girl he likes (played by Milla Jovovich) kisses Parker. Kube decides to kill them both for damaging his lunch. Guest starring Zachary Bostrom as Bobby, Robert M. Bouffard as Delinquent, Lisa Canning as Andrea Russell, Evelina Fernández as Registrar, Sherman Howard as Mr. Lewis (replaced by Timothy Stack), Milla Jovovich as Robin Fecknowitz, Clyde Kusatsu as Mr. Loopman, Scott Thomson as Mr. Kornstein, Mary Ellen Trainor as Mrs. Lewis (replaced by Anne Bloom for the rest of season 1 but reappeared as Mrs. Lewis in seasons 2 and 3).
2	2	"Operation Kubiak"	Andy Tennant	Lon Diamond & Clyde Phillips	September 9, 1990	161952	11.4
Parker arranges a press conference for Kube where he reveals to the Nation that he cannot do basic math. He is in very deep trouble with Kube and Musso unless Parker can get Kube to pass a math test in 4 days. Guest starring Susan Angelo as Reporter No. 2, Robert M. Bouffard as Delinquent, Jack Jozefson as Scout No. 2, Melanie MacQueen as Mrs. Kubiac, Patrick Thomas O'Brien as Mr. Kubiac (as Patrick T. O'Brien), Deborah Stern as Teen Babe, Steve Whiteford as Reporter No. 1 (as Steven Whiteford).
3	3	"Power Play"	Max Tash	Alan Cross & Tom Spezialy	September 16, 1990	TBA	7.5
New boy Matt Stiles (Kevin Wixted) arrives and takes over Parker's place in everything, becoming the most popular boy in school. Even Jerry hands in his coat and glasses (he doesn't need glasses, it seems) and becomes Stiles' second man. Features a Ferris Bueller reference. Guest starring Robert M. Bouffard as Delinquent, Julie Condra as Donna Sue Horton.
4	4	"Parker Lewis Must Lose"	Randall Miller	Tom Straw	September 23, 1990	161953	8.7
The vote for Class President is coming up and Parker decides Becky Grant deserves to win. The problem is the way the students feel, even if he dropped dead, Parker Lewis is sure to win the vote. Guest starring Ruben Avitia as Student Vice President, B.J. Barie as Badge, Robert M. Bouffard as Delinquent, Scott Egan as Jock, Michael Gio Ferrigno as Nemesis, Tiffanie Poston as Cheerleader, Larry Spinak as Conrad Fleck (as Lawrence Spinak), Kim Valentine as Becky Grant, Torri Whitehead as Jamie.
5	5	"Close, But No Guitar"	Bryan Spicer	Lon Diamond & Clyde Phillips	September 30, 1990	161955	9.9
Mikey hits a low spot and drops out of school to become a musician. Appearances by Ziggy Marley and Kool Moe Dee. Features another Ferris Bueller reference. The episode title is a pun on the catchphrase, "Close, but no cigar." Guest starring Robert M. Bouffard as Delinquent, Irina Cashen as Little Girl, Macka Foley as Gym Coach, Robert Greenberg as Teacher No. 1, Wynn Irwin, Mina Kolb as Aunt Celia, Alla Korot as Mary Lou Connor, Rodney Allen Rippy as Student.
6	6	"G.A.G. Dance"	Lyndall Hobbs	Lon Diamond & Clyde Phillips	October 7, 1990	161956	8.5
The "Girls Ask Guys" dance is coming up and Parker gives the guys and gals a talk on confidence so that Tracy Lee will ask him to the dance. But she doesn't and everyone gets a date but Parker. This is the first time Jerry partners with Shelly. Guest starring Hunter Mackenzie Austin as Girl No. 1, Robert M. Bouffard as Delinquent, Alla Korot as Mary Lou Connor, Robyn Lively as Tracy Lee Summers, Penina Segall, Laurie Shiers as Stacy (as Laurie Plaxen), Larry Spinak as Conrad Fleck (as Lawrence Spinak).
7	7	"Love's a Beast"	Max Tash	Adam Barr & Peter Ocko	October 14, 1990	161957	9.6
Mikey's secret admirer is driving him wild while Parker is in a week's detention as Musso has found he has been dodging the first period (a recurring theme) all term. Guest starring B.J. Barie as Badge, Robert M. Bouffard as Delinquent, Keely Christian as Kristen, Laurie Shiers as Stacy (as Laurie Plaxen).
8	8	"Saving Grace"	Bryan Spicer	Russell Marcus	October 21, 1990	161958	9.8
A surprise school inspection and Parker accidentally gets Musso demoted. The new Principal, Dr. Pankow runs the school like a high security prison, with Kube as his second. The buds decide to get Musso back by playing on Pankow's weakness as a control freak. Shelly uses the alias: Shelly Nemec. Guest starring Monty Bane as Cook, Robert M. Bouffard as Delinquent, Ron Canada as man No. 1, Phyllis Flax as Librarian, Gerrit Graham as Dr. Pankow, Robert Greenberg as Loopman, Wesley Mann as man No. 2, Tiffanie Poston as Cheerleader.
9	9	"Musso & Frank"	Max Tash	Lon Diamond & Clyde Phillips	October 28, 1990	161959	10.9
Musso is trying to fix Frank up with her niece (Andrea Elson). Parker fixes him up with another girl instead who turns out to be the niece. In return, Frank has to help Jerry through a test about President Nixon (a hero of Frank's). Frank now wants out of the relationship so Parker has to persuade Musso to end it. David Faustino makes a cameo special guest appearance as a student in detention wearing a T-shirt saying "Polk High" which is a clear reference to his character Bud Bundy on the show he was doing at the time, Married... with Children.
10	10	"Deja Dudes"	Bryan Spicer	Tom Straw	November 4, 1990	161960	11.5
The 1970 school reunion. A time capsule buried and to be opened contains evidence that Parker's father jello-ed Musso which could mean serious trouble for Parker, as his son. Martin Lewis and his two buds were a 1970 version of Parker and his buds, and Parker finds coolness runs in the family. Guest starring Robert M. Bouffard as Delinquent, Michelle Buffone as Tina, Gary Grossman as Gary, R.A. Mihailoff as Bronc Adelson, D. David Morin as Vic (as David Morin), J. Frank Stewart as George, Joel Swetow as Rod, Suzy Broad as Student (uncredited).
11	11	"Radio Free Flamingo"	Jeff Melman	Dave Caplan & Brian LaPan	November 15, 1990	161961	12.3
The buds find a hidden pirate radio station which in 1969 broadcast to the school before being shut down by the Principal of the day and Musso. They start it up again but Musso wants it closed down. Guest starring Robert M. Bouffard as Delinquent, Julie Condra as Donna Sue Horton, Robert Greenberg as Mr. Loopman, Suzy Broad as Student (uncredited)
12	12	"Science Fair"	Max Tash	John DeBellis	November 18, 1990	191652	10.4
Jerry has a history of losing at Science Fairs. Ms. Musso has a bet with Pankow (now Principal of rival, El Corrado High) that her school will win the fair, then as Jerry's invention goes wrong, that her school will lose the fair. Guest starring Robert M. Bouffard as Delinquent, Luke Edwards as Young Jerry, Gerrit Graham as Dr. Pankow, Jack Tice as Judge, Suzy Broad as Student (uncredited)
13	13	"Teacher, Teacher"	Bryan Spicer	Lon Diamond & Clyde Phillips	December 2, 1990	161963	11.0
Everyone likes poetry teacher Miss Donnelly (Penny Johnson Jerald) but one too many of Parker's tricks makes her leave, turning students against him. The Kube is booked for a fight with the equally huge Luke McDonald. Guest starring Lee Anthony as Father No. 2, Robert M. Bouffard as Delinquent, Jaime Cardriche as Luke MacDonald, Lindsey Fields as Mother No. 2 (as Lyndsey Fields), Robby George as Student, John Horn as Mr. Krantz, Delana Michaels as Mother No. 1, Parker Whitman as Father No. 1, Suzy Broad as Student (uncredited)
14	14	"Rent-a-Kube"	Andy Tennant	Tom Straw	December 16, 1990	161964	9.9
After a number of thefts at Mondo Video, Parker hits on the idea of hiring Kube (now 280lbs) as a security guard. However Kube takes the job too seriously and scares all the customers off so Parker is given the job of firing him. Jerry falls for a girl who likes Mikey, so he changes his image to that of Mikey. Ozzy Osbourne appearance. The episode title is a play on the nickname "rent-a-cop" for security guard. Guest starring B.J. Barie as Badge, Robert M. Bouffard as Delinquent, Robert Cavanaugh as Tim, Robby George as Student, Dani Lee as Gina Lang, Gary McGurk as Officer Donovan, Rodney Allen Rippy as Rodney, Paul Wiley as Reverend Rafferty, Suzy Broad as Student (uncredited), Poli Marichal as Sketch Artist (uncredited), William Winckler as Frightened Teen (uncredited).
15	15	"Heather the Class"	Max Tash	Alan Cross & Tom Spezialy	January 13, 1991	TBA	12.1
Shelly joins the school bad girl group The Vogues and loses her best friend, Annie. Kube is too heavy for a wrestling match so Musso blackmails the buds into helping him lose weight. They get him down to 340 lbs. Heather the Class is a reference to a similar "bad girl group" in the 1988 film Heathers. Guest starring Michele Abrams as Jamie, Tiffany Brissette as Annie Ricker, Macka Foley as Gym Coach, Randy Murzynski as Sports Reporter, Suzy Broad as Student (uncredited).
16	16	"Jerry: Portrait of a Video Junkie"	Bryan Spicer	Lon Diamond & Clyde Phillips	February 3, 1991	TBA	9.7
Kube needs Jerry's help with geography but Jerry is spending all his time on video games so Parker and Mikey have to cure him. Also Musso's mother, played by Barbara Billingsley, arrives. Jerry Mathers has a cameo as Musso's brother Theodore. Guest starring Alex Alonso as Student with Radio, Jeffrey Arbaugh as Todd, B.J. Barie as Badge, Aron Eisenberg as Steven, Donna Eskra as Darla, Robby George as Student, Bruce Jarchow as Group Leader, Suzy Broad as Student (uncredited), Livia Milano as Girl in Video Store (uncredited)
17	17	"Splendor in the Class"	Larry Lipton	Michael Swerdlick	February 10, 1991	161968	10.9
The buds break up when Parker's new girlfriend (April Lerman) takes control of his life. The show's title is a pun on the film Splendor in the Grass.
18	18	"The Human Grace"	Max Tash	Tom Straw	February 17, 1991	161967	12.1
Parker helps Musso fall in love with Norman Pankow then finds out he's just using her. The episode ends with her earning Parker's respect. "Weird Al" Yankovic appearance. Guest starring Takayo Fischer as Chairwoman, Robby George as Student, Gerrit Graham as Dr. Pankow, Charles Wahlheim as Randy (as Charles Wahleheim), Suzy Broad as Student (uncredited).
19	19	"Citizen Kube"	Max Tash	Story by : Clyde Phillips & Lon Diamond; Teleplay by : Alan Cross & Tom Spezialy	February 24, 1991	161971	13.7
Kube wins $2,000,000 and everyone but the buds take advantage of him. He quickly spends all the money and is left with an unpaid bill for $9,978. Citizen Kube is a reference to the classic film Citizen Kane, a film about a very wealthy man. Guest starring B.J. Barie as Badge, Taime Downe as Young bum / Rockstar, Dennis Fimple, Wesley Mann as man No. 1, Randy Murzynski as Sports Reporter, Larry Spinak as Conrad Fleck, Ryan Stiles as Man, Jeanne Wolf as herself.
20	20	"Randall Without a Cause"	Max Tash	Lon Diamond & Clyde Phillips	March 10, 1991	161969	10.0
Randall gets restless and joins a biker gang who wreck a garden to even a score. The garden belongs to Musso and Mikey ends up in jail, unwilling to give away the names of the others. Also a running gag with Kube ordering a mountain of food at a drive thru. The episode's title comes from the 1953 Rebel Without a Cause starring James Dean, a persona similar to Randall. Guest starring Ron Dortch as Officer No. 1, Charles Rocket as Sgt. Jake Melman, Dennis Stewart as Mean Guy (as Dennis C. Stewart), Bradford Tatum as Sammy (as Brad Tatum).
21	21	"Jerry's First Date"	Bryan Spicer	Adam Barr & Peter Ocko	March 24, 1991	161970	9.0
Jerry is beset by many insecurities on his first date, some of which come from his future self. Parker and Mikey try to help him but Musso and Frank are after them. Guest starring A.J. Langer as Melissa, Josh Lucas as Evan (as Joshua Lucas), Jan Rabson as Future Jerry, Craig Shoemaker as Jacob, Bob Tzudiker as Doctor, Noni White as Questioner.
22	22	"Against the Norm"	Bryan Spicer	Tom Straw	April 7, 1991	161973	7.4
Dr Pankow (Gerrit Graham) returns and begs Musso for a job. She still has a soft spot for him but all he wants is revenge on her. Also, Kubiac helps Parker against a bully and for payback, asks him to help him cheat on an exam but it turns out to be a set up to catch Pankow in the act of him setting up Musso.
23	23	"King Kube"	Bryan Spicer	Alan Cross & Tom Straw	April 28, 1991	161975	8.7
As a joke, Jerry gets Kube elected Prom King. When Shelly spills the beans that it's a joke and everyone is laughing at him, Kube decides to leave Santo Domingo. Kube gets a girlfriend (Eileen). Musso meets Donny Osmond. Guest starring Joy Creel as Amber, Leanna Creel as Kandy, Monica Creel as Barbie, Larry Spinak as Conrad Fleck, Yohanna Yonas as Eileen Larson.
24	24	"Teens from a Mall"	Andy Tennant	Lon Diamond & Clyde Phillips	May 5, 1991	161974	7.8
Most of the episode takes place in the SD Mall. Mikey works at (Hot) Dog on a stick as a counterman. Jerry is looking for a part-time job there. Musso is a shopaholic. Parker has found the girl (Josie Bissett) of his dreams. Also, Shelly is convinced Frank is a vampire (which would surprise no one). The episode title is a wink at the then-recently released Scenes from a Mall. Guest starring Venus DeMilo as Clerk (as Venus Thomas), Bruce Jarchow as Dr. Carroll, Don Lake as Ira Lefko, Cynthia Mann as Grodnik Griddle Girl, Wesley Mann as Credit Man, Rusty Schwimmer as Lady, Larry Spinak as Conrad Fleck, Ryan Stiles as Clerk.
25	25	"My Fair Shelly"	Andy Tennant	Adam Barr & Peter Ocko	May 12, 1991	161976	7.1
The biggest party of the school year is coming up and Shelly doesn't have a date so she puts the squeeze on Parker (over an old IOU) to find her one. The guy (Jonathan Ward) turns out to be a jerk and she ends up with Jerry. My Fair Shelley refers to the musical My Fair Lady. Guest starring Sharon Case as Joanne, Brooke Theiss as Melinda Harris (as Brooke E. Theiss).
26	26	"Parker Lewis Can't Win"	Bryan Spicer	Tom Straw	May 19, 1991	TBA	7.2
The last day of school for Parker is his worst day ever, mainly thanks to Shelly. All turns out well thanks to caretaker Augie (Ray Walston). Ends with camera pulling back and showing the set, director (Bryan Spicer), producers (Lon Diamond, Clyde Phillips, Tom Straw), etc. Guest starring Robert Cavanaugh as Silhouette No. 1, Richard Feldman as Silhouette No. 2, Jim Lange as himself, Larry Spinak as Conrad Fleck, Kim Valentine as Becky Grant.

=== Season 2 (1991–92) ===
No. overall	No. in season	Title	Directed by	Written by	Original release date	Viewers (millions)
27	1	"Father Knows Less"	Rob Bowman	Peter Ocko & Adam Barr	August 11, 1991	6.1
A local industrialist (Martin Mull) sponsors a contest to build a toast maker with students and a parent. Mikey's father ran out on him 6 months ago and his mother (Sherry Rooney) is juggling two jobs. Also he is helping a delinquent boy (Chris Demetral), so is under pressure. A short fantasy sequence involving the Lewis family titled, Honey I'm Home, is a mishmash of 1950s and 1960s nuclear family TV shows with Ken Osmond appearing as Eddie Haskell from Leave It to Beaver, the theme music and iconic dance step around the ottoman of The Dick Van Dyke Show, and the similar family structure of Father Knows Best (from whence the episode title plays off).
28	2	"A Walk on the Dark Side"	Bryan Spicer	Renee Palyo & Brenda Lilly	August 18, 1991	6.7
We find out that Shelly's trouble with Parker stems from having to live in her popular brother's shadow. Laughed at in her attempt to become a cheerleader, Shelly joins the school bad guys, the Darksiders, led by Jimmy Joe Trout (Rodney Eastman), and is heading towards expulsion. Musso tries to understand how Larry qualified for an academic quiz contest. Frank ranks Larry intellectually below then-vice president Dan Quayle (known for his verbal gaffes). Larry concludes that cogito ergo sum (I think, therefore I am) means "I eat, therefore I am", a response acceptable to the judges. When asked how he knew that, Larry responds, "Existentialism". Guest starring Dee Booher as Maxine, Kristen Corbett as Alice, Jayson Kane as Host, Tiffanie Poston as Janice.
29	3	"Full Mental Jacket"	Rob Bowman	Matt Dearborn	September 1, 1991	6.2
Parker and Mikey try to wean Jerry off of his all-purpose jacket. Just as Jerry starts getting bad withdrawal symptoms, Frank steals the jacket. Without it, Jerry struggles to prepare for a science oral presentation with a girl he likes, Rita (Kristin Dattilo, Yola Gaylen from The Chris Isaak Show). Jerry learns he can succeed even without the jacket. In the meantime, Musso is negotiating a labor contract with Adrian Lite (Robert Trebor, Salamoneus from Xena) who feigns a love interest in Musso to con her into signing a bogus contract. Shelley helps Musso turn the tables. The episode title is a take on the film Full Metal Jacket. Two students, Miss Barr (Tyren Perry) and Mr. Ocko (uncredited), demonstrate a "cell splitting theory" to explain the "mysterious success" of Nelson, a hard rock band founded by twin brothers. The two students' names are an inside reference to the Parker Lewis writing team Adam Barr and Peter Ocko. Parker lists famous incidents of men responding to female tears: Bogey and Ingrid Bergman in Casablanca, Patrick Swayze and Demi Moore in Ghost, and (humorously per the rule of three) Tootie and Blair in The Facts of Life. Guest starring B.J. Barie as Badge.
30	4	"Future Shock"	Bryan Spicer	Alan Cross & Tom Spezialy	September 8, 1991	7.1
Parker manipulates his class schedule to be the same as Donna Sue Horton's (Sharon Case, The Young and the Restless' Sharon Newman). Busted, he must redo it by first deciding what he wants to do when he leaves school. After getting rather bizarre advice from his guidance counselor (Vincent Schiavelli) (who Parker compares to the semi-insane Beetlejuice) and Mikey (with his usual rock-inspired "of course you're confused; it's all so Days of Future Passed), he lapses into total indecisiveness: He can neither take the Pepsi Challenge nor sleep (which hadn't happened since Madonna's performance in Dick Tracy). To press the issue, Musso gives him an intense schedule including R.O.T.C. After getting a military dressing down by Frank a la Gomer Pyle, he responds with Pyle's catchphrase, "Shazam". Musso, disturbed that Parker has become unmotivated, breaks him out of his irresolute pattern by forcing a decision: She busts Mikey and Jerry for speeding in the hallway (to the tune of "Bad Boys" from the TV show COPS) and Parker decides to take the rap. Subsequently he decides on a well-rounded schedule though still deferring a career decision to a later time. For once, Musso was working for Parker's good. Also in the episode, Musso hires animal tracker Rex Huston (Andrew Prine) to trap Kube who is hiding in the air ducts (with a wink to Alien) to avoid a vaccination. Aping the style of Mutual of Omaha's Wild Kingdom, Rex uses Ho Hos as bait, tranquilizes, vaccinates and tags Kube. As reward, Musso takes Rex to the Polynesian-themed Trader Vic's. The episode title is in reference to the Alvin Toffler book, Future Shock. Guest starring Robert Greenberg as Mr. Loopman, Tamara Olson as Pepsi Girl.
31	5	"The Undergraduate"	Jeff Melman	Clyde Phillips & Lon Diamond	September 15, 1991	9.2
Parker opines how school is the "survival of the coolest". Examples: His sister telling how she pranked Parker with the hand in warm water trick, or another student explaining how he discovered cold fusion in a Jello mold, or the jock (Marc Riffon) bragging about his conquest of Parker's English teacher, Mrs. Mason (1982 Playboy Playmate of the Year Shannon Tweed). Parker too becomes infatuated with Ms. Mason and goes as far as giving her an unwelcome kiss while discussing an upcoming debate (topic: talk about yourself, a la Beverly Hills, 90210). The buds waited by their phones to hear all about it – Mikey watched MTV all night, saying, "If I ever see another Wilson Phillips video, I'm going to lose my love thing for (VJ) Daisy Fuentes." A first: he gets good advice from his sister who is worried about where it will lead. Ms. Mason and Parker resolve the tension by making it clear: Teachers "have no business" being intimate with students. The episode title refers to the film, The Graduate, which similarly has a character falling for an older woman. The episode even includes a comparable shot of the iconic camera angle between the legs. A subplot involves Musso finding someone to fill the lead role of The Music Man which, in the end, that someone is Jerry. Guest starring Aaron Lustig,
32	6	"Stormy Mikey"	Bryan Spicer	Clyde Phillips & Lon Diamond	September 22, 1991	9.7
Mikey has an important test coming up but a dishonest record company owner (singer Sonny Bono) uses his own daughter, Claire (Stacy Haiduk), as bait to lure Mikey to sign a crooked contract and he subsequently neglects his studies. Mikey can't believe that Claire would like him, someone from the "other side of the tracks" like in a John Hughes film. Claire, feeling guilty, leaves proof of her father's treachery by Jerry's locker (covered in Jetsons stickers as a lure) and Mikey rejects the contract and studies and passes the exam. This episode introduces Nick Comstock (Paul Johansson), the new counter man at the Atlas diner who Mikey likens to Chris Isaak.
33	7	"Fat Boy and Little Man"	Mark Jean	Peter Ocko & Adam Barr	September 29, 1991	9.6
With team captain Kube's brain in overload, the football coach (Roger Aaron Brown) drafts 110 lb Jerry to play due to his tactical prowess in developing plays such as Vince Lombardi's power sweep. With Kubiak's field defense of Jerry, the team starts winning big. The buds help with a care package of gummy bears, Flintstones vitamins and Tiny Toon medicated heat rub, and with a little Dr. Mario at the local video arcade and a Christian Slater retrospective. The pairing of Kube and Jerry is compared to the diverse teams of Siskel and Ebert, and Mary Hart and John Tesh of Entertainment Tonight. When Jerry becomes the captain, Kube quits the team and starts color commentating with cardboard cutouts of Marv Albert and O. J. Simpson (several years before the murders). Seeing the team and Jerry going down in flames, Kube comes to the rescue in the style of Superman, and jumps onto the field "très Rocketeer". They score a touchdown against El Corrado, a first for the school. The episode title is a play on the film Fat Man and Little Boy. Guest starring Paul Johansson as Nick Comstock, Mary Cadorette as Cathy Lee Austin, Rusty Gray as Ruderman (as Rusty Schmidt).
34	8	"Aging Gracefully"	Bryan Spicer	David Cohen & Roger S. H. Schulman	October 6, 1991	8.9
Musso is upset because she has reached 40 and Dr. Pankow (Gerrit Graham) wonders how he can exploit it. Jerry has a new computer and there is a parody of the HAL rebellion scene from the film, 2001: A Space Odyssey. Guest starring Eve Brenner as Housewife, Mark DeCarlo as himself.
35	9	"The Parker Chronicles"	Bryan Spicer	Clyde Phillips & Lon Diamond	October 13, 1991	9.4
Frank has stolen Parker's audio diary and promises to read excerpts from it at the tenth anniversary celebration of Kube being at school (since 1981). When Parker stalls, Mikey says: "This is only a half hour show, man." Guest starring Mark J. Goodman as Dr. Brendan Carroll, Tony Nittoli as Donald Yemano.
36	10	"Rock 'n' Roles"	Tucker Gates	Sheryl J. Anderson	October 27, 1991	12.2
Devotion to the rock star Jezebel (Karen Fineman) has taken over Shelly's life. Meanwhile, Frank is off so Kube gets his job as monitor but is only interested in monitoring student's food. Guest starring Brian Bradley as Eric, Wendy J. Cooke as Jezebellie No. 2, Laura Jacoby as Jezebellie No. 1, John T. Quern as Robert the Doorman, Kaitlyn Walker as Emily, director Robert Zemeckis as himself.
37	11	"Loves Handles"	Rob Bowman	Renee Palyo & Brenda Lilly	November 3, 1991	9.7
Parker arranges a computer date with Teen Queen, Harriet Guzman (Lesley Boone), who turns out to be a homely girl but he feels guilty and doesn't want to upset her by dropping her. Musso is after another pay grade and has Jerry tutoring her. Frank seems to have a crush on Musso. Guest starring Ann Marie Gillis as Harriet's Mom, Bobbie Phillips as Melinda.
38	12	"Boy Meets Girl"	Rob Bowman	Clyde Phillips & Lon Diamond	November 10, 1991	10.8
Parker meets Annie Sloan (Jennifer Guthrie) and it's love at first sight but he fears losing her. When he asks her to go steady, their relationship looks like breaking up. Guest starring Lindsay Price as Cheyenne Thomas, Francesca Smith as Elaine Leffler, Marisa Theodore as Laura Beatty, Tanya Wright as Girlfriend.
39	13	"Raging Kube"	Bryan Spicer	Alan Cross & Tom Spezialy	November 24, 1991	11.0
Told as a fairy (Flamingo) tale. Girlfriend, Eileen (Yohanna Yonas), makes Kube promise not to fight again. Mafia wannabe Don Yemano (Tony Nittoli) takes advantage of this and terrorizes the school. Kube finally decides to fight him but admits to Parker he doesn't know how to fight. The episode title puns on the film Raging Bull.
40	14	"Tower of Power"	Mark Jean	Peter Ocko & Adam Barr	December 15, 1991	9.7
Mr Tower (Dave Thomas) is a tyrannical history teacher. For the first time, we see Frank in class. Normally brilliant at history, he suffers under Tower and becomes friends with Parker. Guest starring Jennifer Guthrie as Annie Sloan, Malaika as Caroline, Anastacia C. Nemec as Ms. Roth, Anjul Nigam as Anjul.
41	15	"Obscene and Not Heard"	Bryan Spicer	David Cohen & Roger S. H. Schulman	December 22, 1991	9.4
Dr. Pankow (Gerrit Graham) has appointed himself as the head of the Decency Committee and starts censoring the music people listen to. Parker's father stands up to him. The episode title is a take on the idiom "Children should be seen and not heard." Guest starring Ken Kerman as Guard, Gena Law as Diner Patron No. 2, Dennis Cleveland Stewart as Cellmate, Gregory Eugene Travis as Remmel, Tom Waldman as Diner Patron No. 3, Sylvia Webb White as New Mother.
42	16	"Goodbye Mr. Rips"	Larry Shaw	Renee Palyo & Brenda Lilly	January 5, 1992	10.6
Jim Rips (Sam McMurray) is an inspiring biology teacher and everyone likes him. But with a baby on the way, he can no longer survive on a teacher's salary so decides to leave for a better paid job. The students try to get him to stay. Goodbye Mr. Rips is derived from the novel/films Goodbye, Mr. Chips. Guest starring Sean Babb as Kube Jr., B.J. Barie as Badge, Jordan Brady as Robert Wilkes, Joseph Conti as Adult Jerry, Ashley Gardner as Eve, David Rosen as Albert Einstein.
43	17	"Civil Wars"	Bryan Spicer	Peter Ocko & Adam Barr	January 19, 1992	10.5
After 18 years of perfect marriage, Parker's mum goes back to school and the Lewis's come close to splitting up. Jerry comes to stay with the Lewis family for a week. Family Ties parody. Guest starring David Allyn as Customer No. 1, Brian Bonsall as Andrew Keaton, Barbara Perry as Auntie Em, Rodney Allen Rippy as Customer No. 2.
44	18	"Glory Daze"	Bryan Spicer	Alan Cross & Tom Spezialy	February 9, 1992	10.2
School hero Ronny Ray Rasmusun (Harry Anderson) returns to school to accept recognition as one of its Alumni of the Year. He decides to stay to finish a paper and graduate. Parker finds out he is a phony and Musso is worried since he was once her love interest. In the show Ronny gets a box from his old locker which has the singing frog in a box from the cartoon One Froggy Evening. Parker says he is glad some adults are watching the show. Guest starring Robert Greenberg as Mr. Loopman, Ray K. Morris as Stevie, Bill Stevenson as Pizza Man.
45	19	"Boy Meets Girl II"	Bryan Spicer	Clyde Phillips & Lon Diamond	February 16, 1992	9.9
Parker agonizes to the TV audience about his relationship with Annie (Jennifer Guthrie). Musso threatens Mikey and Jerry with an Eerie, Indiana TV marathon. Cassandra Peterson appears as Elvira, Mistress of the Dark. Guest starring Robert Cavanaugh as Jury Foreman, Travis Dultz as Tony, Mark Goodman as Dr. Brendan Carroll, Michael Weiner as Sixties Jerry, the episode's director, Bryan Spicer, as Juror (uncredited).
46	20	"Dance of Romance"	Rob Bowman	David Cohen & Roger S. H. Schulman	March 1, 1992	9.5
Love is in the air, even for Frank so he decides to get some lessons from Nick (Paul Johansson), not knowing that Nick is being rejected by the music teacher. Stars Juliet Landau. Guest starring Kevin Crawford as Dancer, Jennifer Guthrie as Annie Sloan, O'Hara Parker as Dixie Belle, Debra Sandlund as Rebecca.
47	21	"When Jerry Met Shelly"	Rob Bowman	Renee Palyo	March 22, 1992	10.4
Parker is horrified to find that Jerry wants to date his sister and suspects she is using Jerry to get at him. He finally has to admit that Shelly is growing up. The episode title is a play on the 1989 romantic comedy film When Harry Met Sally.... Guest starring Paul Johansson as Nick Comstock. Rusty Gray as Jock (as Rusty Schmidt).
48	22	"Geek Tragedy"	Larry Shaw	Peter Ocko & Adam Barr	April 12, 1992	8.6
When a young girl geek, Terri (Chelsea Lee), who idolizes Jerry, is let down by him and goes to the place geeks go when they are forgotten, Jerry goes there to rescue her. Appearances by eight stars from Beverly Hills, 90210: Gabrielle Carteris, Shannen Doherty, Jennie Garth, Brian Austin Green, Luke Perry, Jason Priestley, Tori Spelling, and Ian Ziering. Guest starring David Allyn as Customer No. 2, Kevin Gardner, Sharyn Leavitt as Customer No. 1, Kristopher Logan as Joe The Bartender, Christopher Neame as The Warrior.
49	23	"Money Talks"	Bryan Spicer	Sheryl J. Anderson	April 26, 1992	8.5
Mikey is always short of cash because he refuses to work for anyone (see season 1, ep 24). He meets a girl and takes a job at the Atlas diner to help him pay for dates but he lets Nick (Paul Johansson) down and is fired. Parker asks Mikey if he wants to borrow his (loud) shirt but he says he is not that desperate. Some face morphing and the P word is used twice. Guest starring Michael D. Arenz as Football Player, Brett Donowho as Steve, F. Flip Dumont as Gladys, Patrick Francis Flannery as Customer, Miles McBroome as Mikey at 12, Asher Metchik as Mikey at 5, Andrea Roth as Carly, Mary Woronov as Officer Gwen.
50	24	"Home Alone with Annie"	Mike Finney	Alan Cross & Tom Spezialy	May 3, 1992	7.7
Parker's parents are away at a convention and his sister is out which gives him a chance to be alone with Annie (Jennifer Guthrie) for the first time. Unfortunately everyone turns up, then the furniture vanishes. Guest starring Curtis Armstrong (best known at the time for the film series Revenge of the Nerds) as himself, B.J. Barie as Badge, Charles Fowlkes as Delivery Man, comedian Dom Irrera as Joey Pants, MTV VJ Martha Quinn as herself.
51	25	"Diner '75"	Rob Bowman	Peter Ocko & Adam Barr	May 17, 1992	6.9
A trainload of toxic waste derails and traps everyone in the diner. Also features the villain The Chameleon. Guest starring Mark J. Goodman as Dr. Brendan Carroll, Jennifer Guthrie as Annie Sloan, singer-songwriter Nikki Hornsby as Folk Singer, Jim Jansen as Reporter, Paul Johansson as Nick Comstock, Joseph Whipp as Railroad Executive.

=== Season 3 (1992–93) ===
No. overall	No. in season	Title	Directed by	Written by	Original release date	Viewers (millions)
52	1	"Flamingo Graffiti"	Larry Shaw	Lon Diamond & Clyde Phillips	July 16, 1992	11.0
Parker has a new hair style and decides to make a name for himself by blowing up the new coach's (John Pinette) lunchbox. Brad Penny (Harold Pruett) gets blamed and at the end when Parker is going to spend the night with Annie (Jennifer Guthrie), he KO's Parker with one punch, so another opportunity lost. Guest starring Roxanne Beckford as Christa, Elliott J. Brown as Donnie, Harmony Smith as Mystery Babe, David Winston as Carl, rapper Young MC as Film Teacher (as Marvin Young).
53	2	"Cape Flamingo"	Rob Bowman	Lon Diamond & Clyde Phillips	July 23, 1992	9.4
Brad (Harold Pruett) wants to be friends with Parker, but Parker ruins it with his paranoia. Also Parker's birthday and Mikey moves house. Guest starring Jennifer Guthrie as Annie Sloan, John Pinette as Coach Hank Kohler, Darnell Davis as Basketball Player, Patrick McCullough as Nirvana Head.
54	3	"The Kiss"	Larry Shaw	Renee Palyo	July 30, 1992	8.5
Shelly is fed up with being seen as a little girl and dreams of going out with Brad (Harold Pruett) and kissing him. Parker tries to stop her. Guest starring Jennifer Guthrie as Annie Sloan, John Pinette as Coach Hank Kohler, Dr. Joyce Brothers as herself, Loretta Jean as Helen, Lego Louis as Bouncer, Brittany Murphy as Angie, Tony Xauet as Xavier.
55	4	"Summer of '92"	Rob Bowman	Lon Diamond & Clyde Phillips	August 6, 1992	7.8
Annie (Jennifer Guthrie) is away for the weekend and 16-year-old Parker and Mikey go to a rave with two (older) college girls and then go back to their place afterward. Will Parker succumb to temptation? Guest starring John Pinette as Coach Hank Kohler, Martha Byrne as Erin, Star Trek's Michael Dorn (Worf) as Swap Meet Customer, Ray K. Morris as Ben, Harold Pruett as Brad Penny, Liz Vassey as Maryr.
56	5	"Love is Hell"	Larry Shaw	David Steven Cohen & Roger S.H. Schulman	August 13, 1992	9.8
Annie (Jennifer Guthrie) turns out to be better than Parker at dispensing love advice. Jerry sets up a firework display reading "Love is Shelly" but the S and Y stop, so the title. Musso sings a duet with Kohler (John Pinette) but loves the piano player, so Kohler finds solace with another woman. Guest starring Maggie Blye as Harry's Mom, Carol Ficatier as Fantasy Babe, Justin Garms as Timmy, Paul Hipp as Harry, Wendie Jo Sperber as Carol.
57	6	"Jerry's Journey"	Rob Bowman	Adam Barr & Peter Ocko	August 20, 1992	10.8
Jerry hangs out with Brad (Harold Pruett) and his gang. He has his first drink, some more drinks and ends up drunk. Guest starring Jennifer Guthrie as Annie Sloan, John Pinette as Coach Hank Kohler, Ritch Brinkley, Adam Gregor, Tim Griffin, Jacqueline Obradors, Paul Sarnoff, Ryan Stiles as Weather Guy, Roger Til.
58	7	"Beauty and the Kube"	Mike Finney	Adam Barr & Peter Ocko	September 6, 1992	6.1
Summer holidays are over and back to school. Kube turns out to be good with kids so helps Annie in daycare at school. Attention from her makes Kube think she is in love with him but he is due for a let down. Show has Beauty and the Beast scenes as well as My Three Sons. Kube says he: "speak like Tarzan". Guest starring Jennifer Guthrie as Annie Sloan, John Pinette as Coach Hank Kohler, Joey Amic-Angelo as Jerry-Like Kid, B.J. Barie as Badge, Rickey D'Shon Collins as Kevin, Sam Gifaldi as Kid, Michael Nunes as Stanley, Drew Joseph Rowe as Kube Jr..
59	8	"Hungry Heart"	Bryan Spicer	Renee Palyo	September 13, 1992	6.2
The coach (John Pinette) finds another woman to love and Musso rejoices but it looks like it might not last. Guest starring Jennifer Guthrie as Annie Sloan, Mijanou as Babe, Michael Nunes as Timmy, Grey's Anatomy's James Pickens Jr. as Fred, Wendie Jo Sperber.
60	9	"Lewis and Son"	Mike Finney	Alan Cross & Tom Spezialy	September 20, 1992	6.5
Powderkeg Video open up a store locally and gives Mondo Video a hard time. Parker loses his social life as the business tries to keep going and his father decides to work for the competition. Guest starring Jennifer Guthrie as Annie Sloan, Phil Hartman as Phil Diamond, Heather Holland as Charlene.
61	10	"Kohler Buys the Diner"	Larry Shaw	David Steven Cohen & Roger S.H. Schulman	September 27, 1992	5.2
Kohler's (John Pinette) mother dies and leaves him lots of money so he buys the diner. However he has always been under the thumb of his mother and father, Harrison (William Schallert) and it quickly becomes a failure with no diners and no staff. Guest starring Jennifer Guthrie as Annie Sloan, O'Neal Compton as Fez Man, Pamela Rowan as Waitress, Charles C. Stevenson Jr. as Customer.
62	11	"Parker's Got a Brand New Car"	Larry Shaw	Lon Diamond & Clyde Phillips	March 21, 1993	7.1
Parker gets a sports car instead of the family model his father wanted him to buy. His father tries it and puts a dent in it, a dent which Parker later thinks he put in it. Guest starring Jennifer Guthrie as Annie Sloan, Harold Pruett as Brad Penny.
63	12	"An Unmarried Musso"	Rob Bowman	Renee Palyo	March 28, 1993	5.2
Musso falls for Parker's rich uncle Bill and he dreads having her as an aunt. But while Musso is checking out wedding dresses, Bill tells Parker it is just a fling. If Musso finds out, she'll take it out on Parker. Guest starring Glen Chin as Workman, Barry Cullison as Bill, Jennifer Guthrie as Annie Sloan, Harold Pruett as Brad Penny, Allen Williams as Dr. Cabe, Jack Yates as Joer.
64	13	"Educating Brad"	Mike Finney	Clyde Phillips	April 4, 1993	6.6
Brad joins an English class to be near a girl he likes and overshadows Parker in class. Guest starring Jennifer Guthrie as Annie Sloan, Khrystyne Haje as Nicole, John Pinette as Coach Hank Kohler, Harold Pruett as Brad Penny, Lynn Tufeld as Ms. Bell.
65	14	"The Love Bug"	Mike Finney	Clyde Phillips	April 11, 1993	4.8
Annie avoids Parker and he thinks she is falling out of love with him. Guest starring Jennifer Guthrie as Annie Sloan, Virginia Watson as Dr. Grummons.
66	15	"Write or Die"	Larry Shaw	Clyde Phillips	April 18, 1993	4.3
Mikey hasn't written his assignment for Creative Writing class and is in trouble if it is not written by next morning. His friends rally around him but Mikey doesn't seem interested. Among storylines suggested is Mikey Can't Lose, based on seasons 1 & 2 of this show but Annie (Jennifer Guthrie) complains it is too cartoony. Also a Santo Domingo 60609 (their zipcode?) based on Beverly Hills 90210. Show ends with Mikey doing imitation of a Stephen J. Cannell show ending. Guest starring Virginia Watson as Dr. Grummons.
67	16	"The Bitch is Back"	Larry Shaw	Clyde Phillips	April 25, 1993	4.2
Parker is having one of the best days of his life when Mikey turns up with this week's love of his life, Stacy Snyder (Michelle Burke). She was Parker's first big love two years ago until she walked out on him one day without explanation. Now he fears the same will happen with Mikey. Guest starring Robert Austen as Heavy Metaleer, Rick Cicetti as Official Man, Jennifer Guthrie as Annie Sloan, John Pinette as Coach Hank Kohler.
68	17	"Musso: A Wedding"	Larry Shaw	Clyde Phillips	May 2, 1993	4.7
Musso meets old boyfriend Kevin O'Brien (Dennis de Boisblanc) who is now divorced and they get on well together. Musso does get married, twice, but.... Guest starring Carmen Filpi as Wino, Jennifer Guthrie as Annie Sloan, John Pinette as Coach Hank Kohler, Sam Whipple as Reverend Gandin.
69	18	"A Night to Remember"	Rob Bowman	Sheryl J. Anderson	May 9, 1993	3.9
Junior Prom Night. Parker arranges for a room with Annie (Jennifer Guthrie) but Shelly has got someone to take her there so Parker has to keep an eye on her, and fails. Carrie parody. Guest starring Roger Callard as Andy, Tim Halpen as Dave, Eliott Harold as Jerry Clone, Arte Johnson as Hotel Desk Clerk, Lego Louis as Bouncer.
70	19	"Boys Night In"	Larry Shaw	David Silverman and Stephen Sustarsic	May 23, 1993	5.3
Parker and Mikey try to make Jerry more mature and after a boring session at home, take him to a strip club. Guest starring William Bermender as Mark Hillis, Tom Billett as Bouncer, Marci Brickhouse as Girl, Jennifer Guthrie as Annie Sloan, Gary Kasper as Cop No. 2, John Pinette as Coach Hank Kohler, Bari K. Willerford as Cop No. 1.
71	20	"Senior Jerry"	Mike Finney	David Steven Cohen and Roger S.H. Schulman	May 30, 1993	4.5
Jerry has done so well at school he is put into a Senior class, but on his first exam, the straight A student gets a B+ . Jerry decides to drop out of school and become a bricklayer with Brad (Harold Pruett). Both Jerry's parents here are doctors. In announcements at the start; Pearce and McIntyre report to O.R. and later; The movie for tonight is... (from M*A*S*H). Guest starring Tanya Boyd as Calculus Teacher, Mitch Kreindel as Mr. Steiner, L. Kenneth Richardson as Official Looking Guy, Linda Shayne as Mrs. Steiner.
72	21	"The Rocky Kohler Picture Show"	Larry Shaw	Clyde Phillips	June 6, 1993	4.6
The students have a movie madness night when they send up an old horror film. They invite Kube, then Kohler (John Pinette), but Kohler makes himself unwelcome so they drop him and Kube leaves with him. Kohler feels that he is stopping Kube from mixing with people his own age so tries to distance himself from Kube. The episode title is a pun on The Rocky Horror Picture Show. Guest starring Scott Wolf as Brian Sommerville (as Scott Richard Wolf).
73	22	"The Last Supper"	Mike Finney	Clyde Phillips	June 13, 1993	4.1
Kohler (John Pinette) has lost the lease to the Atlas diner and it is due to be pulled down. Show is full of clips from earlier shows, connected by a juke-box and ends with lights being turned out in the empty diner. Guest starring Jennifer Guthrie as Annie Sloan, Francis X. McCarthy, Biff Yeager as Wrecking Ball Operator.
