= Troy Slaten =

American actor (born 1975)

- Born: Troy William Slaten; February 21, 1975 (age 51); Los Angeles, California, U.S.
- Education: University of California, Los Angeles; Pepperdine University
- Occupations: ALJ; actor; attorney; legal analyst

Troy William Slaten (born February 21, 1975) is an American attorney and former child actor, best known for his work depicting Jerry Steiner on the series Parker Lewis Can't Lose, Michael Lacey on Cagney & Lacey, and Amp Ere in Superhuman Samurai Syber-Squad.

== Biography ==
Slaten was born in Los Angeles. He starred in several television series in supporting roles during the 1980s and the 1990s. He was on the 1980s series Cagney & Lacey as Michael Lacey, one of the on-screen children of Mary Beth Lacey (Tyne Daly) and Harvey Lacey Sr. (John Karlen), and later, he appeared in the series Superhuman Samurai Syber-Squad as Amp. His most memorable role was on the series Parker Lewis Can't Lose as Jerry Steiner.

Slaten graduated from UCLA with Honors earning a B.A. in English Literature, earned a J.D. degree from Pepperdine University's School of Law, and became an attorney practicing corporate law and litigation in Southern California and a partner with the law offices of Floyd, Skeren, Manukian & Langevin, LLP. As of 2020, Slaten is a partner of the firm's Los Angeles County Practice.

Slaten appeared on Ken Reid's TV Guidance Counselor podcast on June 15, 2016.

Slaten has been a legal analyst for several broadcast networks and their subsidiaries, including Fox News Channel, CNN, HLN, CBS, and NBC. He has been a frequent guest on television shows. including Nancy Grace, Dr. Drew, Happening Now, The O'Reilly Factor, Shepard Smith Reporting, and Primetime Justice.

In the March 3, 2020 Presidential Primary election, Slaten unsuccessfully ran for judge of the Los Angeles Superior Court in Seat 145, where he received over 560,000 votes.

In the June 7, 2022 Primary election, Slaten unsuccessfully ran for judge of the Los Angeles Superior Court in Seat 60, receiving 10% of the votes.

== Filmography ==
Year	Title	Role	Notes
1982–88	Cagney & Lacey	Michael Lacey	Main cast (73 episodes)
1982	The Greatest American Hero	Little Boy	Episode: "The Resurrection of Carlini"
1984	E/R	Pascha	Episode: "Say It Ain't So"
1984	Johnny Dangerously	Young Tommy	Feature film
1985	Diff'rent Strokes	Lionel	Episode: "Sam Adopts a Grandparent"
1985	Who's the Boss?	David	Episode: "It Happened One Summer" (Parts 1 & 2)
1986	Simon & Simon	Cricket	Episode: "Sunrise at Camp Apollo"
1986	My Sister Sam	Paperboy	Episode: "Jingle Bell Rock Bottom"
1988	Side by Side	Young Charlie	TV movie
1989	Roseanne	Martin	Episode: "Brain-Dead Poets Society"
1990	Murphy Brown	Henry	Episode: "I Want My FYI"
1990	The Wonder Years	Eric	Episode: "The Glee Club"
1990–93	Parker Lewis Can't Lose	Jerry Steiner	Main cast (73 episodes)
1993	Jack the Bear	Edward Festinger	Feature film
1994–95	Superhuman Samurai Syber-Squad	Amp Ere	Main cast (39 episodes)
1995	Night Stand with Dick Dietrick	Rob	Episode: "Cults"
1997	Step by Step	Morton Osgood	Episode: "It Didn't Happen One Night"
1999	Rescue 77	Panther	Episode: "A Bumpy Ride"
