= Maia Brewton =

American actress

- Occupations: Actress, attorney
- Years active: 1984–present
- Spouse: Lara Spotts
- Children: 2

Maia Brewton (born September 30, 1977) is an American actress who was active in the late 1980s and early 1990s. She is known for her roles as the Mighty Thor-obsessed Sara Anderson in the 1987 film Adventures in Babysitting, and as Shelly Lewis, the antagonistic sister of the title character on the Fox Network show Parker Lewis Can't Lose, from 1990 to 1993.

== Acting career ==
In 1985, she appeared in Back to the Future as Sally Baines, the younger sister of Marty McFly's mother Lorraine Baines. She then played Margaret Ann Culver in the short-lived 1985 television series Lime Street, starring Robert Wagner and Samantha Smith. After her role in Adventures in Babysitting, she played one of the children in the 1990 TV movie with Robert Mitchum which was the basis for the series A Family for Joe, and co-starred in the 1990 TV movie Sky Trackers with Pamela Sue Martin. This was followed by her run on Parker Lewis Can't Lose.

Her other television credits during the late 1980s include appearances on 21 Jump Street, Highway to Heaven, Trapper John, M.D. and The Wonder Years. She has also acted in various theatre productions, most notably at the City Garage Theatre in Santa Monica, California.

== Personal life ==
She married television executive and producer Lara Spotts in 2008. The couple has twin boys.

== Partial filmography ==
- Back to the Future (1985) – Sally Baines
- The Deliberate Stranger (1986) – Jenny Richter
- Adventures in Babysitting (1987) – Sara Anderson
- Parker Lewis Can't Lose (1990 - 1993) - Shelly Lewis
