= The Colony (1996 film) =

- Genre: Thriller
- Written by: Richard Shapiro; Esther Shapiro; John Whelpley
- Directed by: Tim Hunter
- Starring: Michael Paré; Brian Bloom; Alla Korot; Casper Van Dien
- Countries of origin: United States; Canada
- Original language: English

Production
- Executive producers: Esther Shapiro; Richard Shapiro
- Producers: Cathy Dwyer; Philip L. Parslow; Barbara Wall; John Whelpley
- Running time: 95 minutes
- Production companies: Richard & Esther Shapiro Productions; All American Television

Original release
- Network: ABC
- Release: July 4, 1996

The Colony is a 1996 TV film directed by Tim Hunter.

== Plot ==
A man moves his family into a suburbia that at first seems fantastic, but soon turns into a nightmare.

== Cast ==
- Michael Paré as Alec Harken
- Brian Bloom as Mick McCann
- Alla Korot as Jessica James
- Casper Van Dien as Sawyer
- Alison Moir as Julia Harken
- Jennifer Guthrie as Molly Lanford
- Leland Sun as Paul Rocha
- Jeff Arbaugh as Emmett Maxwell (credited Jeffrey Arbaugh)
- Jane A. Rogers as Deputy Kerwood
- William Smith as Theo
- John Vargas as Paul Roger
- Michael Woods as Dr. Harken

== Reception ==
Hal Erickson of Rovi wrote "Set in a high-price Malibu community, this made-for-TV drama wallows in a multitude of extramarital affairs, corporate intrigue and elegant back-stabbing, with murder the logical extension to all the hanky-panky. Characters crucial to the plotline are a cop posing as an auto mechanic, and a sexy nanny who intends to break up her best friend's marriage. The ending is abrupt and unsatisfying, a sure sign that the film was actually the pilot for an unsold series. Written and produced by Dynasty veterans Richard Shapiro and Esther Shapiro, The Colony was originally consigned to a 'dog day'"
