= Superhuman Samurai Syber-Squad =

American TV series

- Genre: Tokusatsu; Science fiction Action-adventure; Mecha; Superhero; Comedy thriller Cyberpunk
- Created by: James Rowley; Jymn Magon; Mark Zaslove
- Based on: Gridman the Hyper Agent by Tsuburaya Productions
- Starring: Matthew Lawrence; Glen Beaudin; Troy Slaten; Rembrandt Sabelis; Kevin Castro; Robin Mary Florence; Jayme Betcher; John Wesley; Diana Bellamy; Kelli Kirkland
- Voices of: Tim Curry
- Narrated by: Gary Owens (opening narration)
- Composers: Reed Robbins; Mark Simon
- Countries of origin: United States; Japan
- Original language: English
- No. of seasons: 1
- No. of episodes: 53

Production
- Executive producers: Andy Heyward; Noboru Tsuburaya; Robby London; Brad Kreisberg; Joe Taritero
- Running time: 22–24 minutes
- Production companies: DIC Productions; Ultracom; Tsuburaya Productions (Note: Original footage.)

Original release
- Network: First-run syndication
- Release: September 12, 1994 – April 11, 1995

Superhuman Samurai Syber-Squad (for short, SSSS) is a television series produced by Tsuburaya Productions, Ultracom Inc. and DIC Productions, L.P., with distribution by All American Television. It ran for a duration of 53 episodes from September 12, 1994 to April 11, 1995 in syndication, as well as nationwide on WWOR EMI Service. It was an adaptation of the Japanese tokusatsu series Gridman the Hyper Agent.

== Plot ==
"The evil Kilokahn lives inside computer circuits! With the help of Malcolm Frink, he creates Mega-Virus Monsters to attack electronic systems! Meanwhile, a freak accident turns Sam Collins into Servo. His friends join forces in their samurized attack vehicles. Together, they transform into...the Superhuman Samurai Syber-Squad!"

— opening narration (as provided by Gary Owens)

High school student Sam Collins, the head of a band known as Team Samurai, is zapped during a recording session by a power surge and disappears, only to return seconds later with a strange device attached to his wrist which, at the time, is unremovable.

Later after his friends, Amp, Sydney, and Tanker leave, one of his video game programs, dubbed Servo, is subject to a power surge and zaps Sam again just after he has remarked "Cool battle armor!" - this time he is pulled into the digital world and transformed into his creation. As Servo, he roams the digital world and fights monsters dubbed Mega-Viruses which are capable of attacking any device on the electrical grid (including the grid itself), Internet or telephone network, usually having real-life consequences far beyond what any standard computer virus would be capable of achieving.

Meanwhile, Malcolm Frink, another student from Sam's school, is designing monsters on his home computer when Kilokahn, an escaped military artificial-intelligence program that was presumed destroyed in the power surge, visits him via his computer screen and strikes a Faustian deal with him, transforming his digital monster into a Mega-Virus.

Sam, now as Servo, must enter the digital world and stop Malcolm's and Kilokahn's Mega-Viruses. Sometimes, when Servo is unable to handle a virus by himself, he would enlist the help of his friends using his Arsenal Programs which could fight the viruses solo, transform, with the help of other Programs, and attach to Servo as armor. Since Team Samurai consists of only three people at any one time following Sam's disappearance, only three vehicles are available for use at any one time. When Servo combines with these Programs as armor, he changes his name to either Phormo once combined with Drago or Synchro once combined with Zenon.

== Characters ==
=== Team Samurai ===
The main character, Servo

- Samuel "Sam" Collins / Servo (portrayed by Matthew Lawrence) is the frontman and guitarist of his band, Team Samurai. He is always willing to help anyone in need or be their friend and often vies for the attention of cheerleader Jennifer Doyle, having been in and out of relationships with her, sometimes even competing with Malcolm Frink for her affections. He even goes so far as to try to be friends with Malcolm, although Malcolm never returns the favor. He is clever and easygoing. He also loves his younger sister, Elizabeth, though often feels pestered by her shenanigans.
- Tanker (portrayed by Kevin Castro) is Sam's best friend, the band's drummer, and a somewhat stereotypical athlete. He is particularly adept at school sports, especially football. He has a crush on fellow Team Samurai member Sydney, especially admiring her for her intelligence. He always seems to have a large appetite, and as evidenced in the episode "A Break in the Food Chain", he goes crazy if he eats nothing for a duration. He also holds a particularly strong dislike for Malcolm Frink. In Syberspace, Tanker wears a black biker suit with a black helmet and transparent visor.
- Sydney "Syd" Forrester (portrayed by Robin Mary Florence) is the band's keyboard player and the brains of the group. She is one of North Valley High's brightest students, and often displays a caring personality. She is the object of Tanker's affection, and the two enjoy being together. In Syberspace, Sydney wears a pink biker suit with a gold helmet and transparent visor.
- Amp Ere (portrayed by Troy Slaten) is the team's so-called "space cadet" and the band's bass player. He has an unorthodox way of performing tasks, such as writing in a notebook using his toes or studying by eating book pages with milk and sugar. To enter Syberspace, he always uses a different phrase to be humorous. In Syberspace, Amp wears a helicopter helmet and leather jacket. It is later revealed that Amp is really an alien, at which point he returns to his home planet.
- Lucky London (portrayed by Rembrandt Sabelis) is a surfer and Amp's replacement in Team Samurai. His attitude is often laid-back, sometimes to the dismay of Principal Pratchert, and his level of intelligence appears to be about the same as that of Amp. In Syberspace, Lucky wears a red and white jet ski helmet with a black visor and life jacket.

=== Supporting characters ===
- Jennifer "Jen" Doyle (portrayed by Jayme Betcher) is Sam's on-again/off-again girlfriend and a cheerleader at North Valley High School. Malcolm tries to compete for her affections to no avail. In the alternate universe, Jen is a genius who helps Sam get back to his normal universe.
- Principal Pratchert (portrayed by John Wesley) is the school principal who is usually strict, particularly when dealing with antics caused by either Sam or Malcolm. In "Pratchert's Radical Departure", it is revealed that Pratchert used to be a hippie when he was younger as Malcolm uses this to his advantage by creating a Mega-Virus monster that makes him think he was a hippie again.
- Mrs. Rimba "Cha-Cha" Starkey (portrayed by Diana Bellamy) is a lunch lady who often cracks jokes relating to the poor quality of the food she serves, such as enjoying her hobby of riding her motorcycle and being married multiple times. She is the only faculty member in North Valley High School who does not like Malcolm.
- Yolanda "Yoli" Pratchert (portrayed by Kelli Kirkland) is the principal's daughter and Jennifer's closest friend. She is North Valley High School's student council president, a position she temporarily loses in "The President's a Frink" when Malcolm cheats his way into office. In "What Rad Universe!", an alternate dimension version of Yolanda finds companionship in Kilokahn, taking the place of Malcolm.
- Elizabeth "Liz" Collins (voiced by Kath Soucie) is Sam's "unseen" younger sister who communicates with her brother off-screen through a laundry chute connected from the upstairs. She always plays pranks on her older brother, usually dropping things on top of him through the chute. Liz has shown she does care for Sam and drops a ton of cookies to share with him.
- Elizabeth Anderson (portrayed by Gayle Anderson) is a newscaster who reports on the Mega-Virus Monsters.

=== Villains ===
- Kilokahn (voiced by Tim Curry): Short for "Kilometric Knowledge-base Animate Human Nullity", Kilokahn is a military artificial intelligence program who unleashes computer viruses to attack major computer systems. He derisively refers to humans as "meat-things". He considers himself the ruler of the digital world and also wishes to take over the real world (Earth) starting with its computer network.
- Malcolm Frink (portrayed by Glen Beaudin) is a loner who finds companionship in Kilokahn. Using a special program, he designs the Mega-Viruses, which are brought to life by Kilokahn. Sam sees that Malcolm is alone and tries to strike up a friendship with him, but Malcolm rejects his offers stating that he likes being alone. In the alternate universe, Malcolm is a generous and caring person who likes to help people, unlike the alternate Yoli who takes pleasure from harming others.

==== Mega-Virus Monsters ====
The Mega-Virus Monsters are kaiju-like computer viruses produced by Malcolm and given sentience by Kilokahn. Malcolm creates the Mega-Viruses since Kilokahn lacks the ability. Only a few Mega-Viruses have the power of speech.

- Kathod is the first virus that Servo ever fought after Malcolm first met Kilokahn. Kathod is a long-tailed turtle-like creature with the ability to generate fireballs at will.
- Blink is an armored cycloptic Mega-Virus with skilled fighting techniques. Blink wields twin sticks that he can merge into a double-edged combat stick.
- Trembulor is a large black spike-covered Mega-Virus with the ability to shake wildly, causing tremors in Syberspace.
- Thorned Virus is a pink dinosaur-like Mega-Virus with leaf veins patterned throughout its body. It is able to shoot white powder from its mouth.
- Krono is a diamond-backed dinosaur-like Mega-Virus with the ability to fire blue beams from its mouth.
- Plexton is a dinosaur-like Mega-Virus with fire abilities.
- Cronick is an arthropod-like Mega-Virus made from a chromium alloy with a bladed left arm and a pincer-like right arm. On its chest is a red jewel that unleashes a barrier when struck.
- Skorn (voiced by Neil Ross) is a ninja-like Mega-Virus, deemed as perhaps the smartest of viruses, second-in-command to Kilokahn, and one of the few Mega-Virus capable of speech. He wields different weapons in battle, such as a sword, and a pair of nunchaku (which he also turned into a bo). Skorn is also able to clone himself.
- Kord is a giant reptilian Mega-Virus with a camera-like eye, blinding floodlights on his back, two tails, and magnetic plates. Kord is able to shoot fireballs of up to 10,000 degrees Celsius and can heat his shell at will.
- Gramm is a dinosaur-like Mega-Virus with ice abilities and the sister of Plexton.
- Sucker Virus is a dinosaur-like Mega-Virus with a large mouth containing coils.
- Skeleton Virus is a Ceratopsian-like Mega-Virus with skeletal armor.
- Unnamed Virus #1 is a draconic Mega-Virus that is sent into a fortune-telling game to turn everyone into the opposite of what their future would be.
- Hock is a green aardvark/dinosaur-like Mega-Virus with tough armor, a pair of sword gauntlets on both arms, and a sickle-tipped tail.
- Sybo (voiced by Glen Beaudin) is an orange dinosaur-like Mega-Virus with six spike-like appendages. In the episode "Mal-Kahn-Tent", Kilokahn takes over Malcolm's body and traps Malcolm's consciousness in Sybo's body. After Sybo is destroyed by Servo, Malcolm returns to his original body. In later episodes, Sybo appears without Malcolm's mind.
- Troid is a blue Pterodactylus-like Mega-Virus with the ability to become invisible.
- Unnamed Virus #2 is a robotic salamander/Stegosaur-like Mega-Virus used by Malcolm to knock out the world's electricity in "Hello Darkness, My Old Friend". The virus later appears in the episodes "Portrait of the Artist as a Young Virus" and "Pratchert's Radical Departure".
- Sydney's Virus: In the episode "Pride Goeth Before a Brawl", Kilokahn gives up on Malcolm and decides to enlist Sydney in his place. Kilokahn coerces Sydney into creating a Mega-Virus, which turns out to be a timid, peach-colored creature with a head on its abdomen. Kilokahn later shows Malcolm what Sydney created, and Malcolm attempts to make the virus truly evil, giving her an upgrade in the form of a black, rhinoceros-like head. The virus attempts to apologize to Sydney, only to be eliminated by Phormo.
- Nightmare Virus is a stag beetle/dinosaur-like Mega-Virus with a large shell and tentacle-like arms.
- Rock n' Roll Virus (voiced by Jess Harnell) is a dinosaur-like Mega-Virus with a delinquent theme who turns Mrs. Starkey into a heavy rock and roll maniac in "Rock n' Roll Virucide".
- Smog Virus is a black dinosaur-like Mega-Virus with two tails from which it can emit deadly red smog.
- Stupid Virus (voiced by Neil Ross) is a black dinosaur-like Mega-Virus similar in appearance to Skeleton.
- Manfu is a dark green hunchbacked reptilian Mega-Virus whose head is embedded in his abdomen. His horns can emit blasts of electricity.
- Nexor is a Hercules beetle/dinosaur-like Mega-Virus with pincer-like horns.
- Raedon is a Mega-Virus resembling Troid that can emit deadly lasers from its wings.
- Unnamed Virus #3: This virus was not officially named on the show, but he very much resembled a non-armored version of Krono. This version has a light bulb-like structure on his head.

== Production ==
Superhuman Samurai Syber-Squad was originally created by Tsuburaya Productions, Ultracom Inc. and DIC Productions, L.P. and was originally going to be named PowerBoy, but was renamed during production to avoid confusion with Saban Entertainment's American tokusatsu series Mighty Morphin Power Rangers. The series was made to capitalize on the upsurge in popularity of imported Japanese monster-robot shows which could be adapted with new, regionalized live-action footage. The series' development mirrored the creative construct established earlier with the Teenage Mutant Ninja Turtles. The master toy licensee, Playmates Toys, funded the series, interpolated American development via toy licensing rights, and did a commercial buy-in on the Fox network, where Haim Saban had established a kids block, with programs such as Mighty Morphin' Power Rangers and the 1992 X-Men cartoon. Playmates called upon the development team at DIC—which, coincidentally, was working with Pangea Corporation, which assisted in the development of DIC's New Kids on the Block and Playmates' earlier hit, Teenage Mutant Ninja Turtles. DIC, Pangea, and Playmates' marketing group created an ensemble of character names, traits and profiles, which were spun into a series offering. Under a product placement deal, Compaq computers were prominently featured in the series and were used to generate the show's computer-generated graphics.

Elements of this series are used in the anime series adaptation of Gridman the Hyper Agent, SSSS.Gridman. The "SSSS" abbreviation in the title references Superhuman Samurai Syber-Squad.

== Episodes ==
No.	Title	Directed by	Written by	Original release date
1	"To Protect and Servo"	Brad Kreisberg	Jymn Magon & Mark Zaslove	September 12, 1994
Sam Collins discovers the world of Syberspace and becomes Servo, fighter for justice. Meanwhile, Malcolm Frink is visited by Kilokahn, a powerful computer program who offers to bring Malcolm's monster designs to life as Mega-Virus Monsters and wreak havoc in the world.
2	"Samurize"	Brad Kreisberg	Jymn Magon & Mark Zaslove	September 13, 1994
Malcolm creates the Blink virus and sends it into the police files in order to cause a false arrest. Jennifer is also arrested, causing extreme friction in their budding relationship and bringing Malcolm as a front runner for her affections when Sam wrongly starts accusing her. Luckily, Sydney suspects something awry and believes Malcolm had something to do with Jennifer's wrongful arrest. Even after defeating the virus, Jennifer refuses to forgive Sam much to Malcolm's delight. Afterwards, Sydney reprimands Sam for his poor judgment.
3	"Samurize, Guys!"	Brad Kreisberg	Jymn Magon & Mark Zaslove	September 14, 1994
Sam and his rock band, Team Samurai, are to perform at a concert at North Valley High School that night as Sam works to make it up to Jennifer following the incident caused by Blink, but Malcolm has other ideas. He creates the Trembulor virus to create an impenetrable barrier around Sam's house. Luckily, Sydney catches on and she along with Amp, Sam and Tanker go in to defeat Trembulor as Synchro. Team Samurai arrives and Jennifer forgives Sam, much to Malcolm's dismay.
4	"Amp Loves You, Yeah, Yeah, Yeah!"	Brad Kreisberg	Jymn Magon & Mark Zaslove	September 15, 1994
Amp falls in love with Ms. Tilden, a substitute teacher. After mistaking an utterly hideous old woman for the object of their friend's affections, Sam, Sydney, and Tanker come up with a plan to make him forget about his crush. That is until they see Ms. Tilden as a lovely fresh-out-of-college woman, and not the old woman who turns out to be Mrs. Starkey's mother (also played by Diana Bellamy). Meanwhile, Servo has to deal with a powerful Sucker Virus that proves too strong and the entire Syber-Squad needs to team up to stop it.
5	"An Un-Helping Hand"	Gino Tanasescu	Jymn Magon & Mark Zaslove	September 16, 1994
Sydney earns a 'B' on her report card, which is the least of her worries because a Mega-Virus called Skorn has taken over her wristwatch. It causes her hand to go on a petty crime spree, but Tanker quickly catches on, takes off the watch and Servo is sent to stop the virus.
6	"His Master's Voice"	Brad Kreisberg	Jymn Magon & Mark Zaslove	September 19, 1994
The Skorn virus is created by Kilokahn after Malcolm's voice is made fun of on a keyboard synthesizer. This virus has a mind of its own and sends it into the synthesizer effectively switching Syd and Tanker's voices on the night of the school talent show, forcing Sam and Amp to figure out a way to save their friends and stop the Skorn Virus at the same time. Afterwards Malcolm is touched when Sydney apologizes to him.
7	"Some Like it Scalding"	Gino Tanasescu	Jymn Magon & Mark Zaslove	September 20, 1994
Sam decides to have a slumber party at North Valley High School as the school's fundraiser, but Malcolm sends the fire virus Plexton into the school's thermostat.
8	"Mal-Kahn-Tent"	Brad Kreisberg	Jymn Magon & Mark Zaslove	September 21, 1994
Kilokahn decides to experience life in the real world by taking over Malcolm's body. He then sticks Malcolm inside of a Mega-Virus monster named Sybo. Sam and the others notice that it really is Kilokahn inside Malcolm's body, and it is up to Servo to save Malcolm.
9	"The Cold Shoulder"	Brad Kreisberg	Jymn Magon & Mark Zaslove	September 22, 1994
Malcolm creates Gramm, sister to the fire virus Plexton, and sends it into Sam's air conditioner to turn people cold and against one another. Servo must destroy Gramm in order to break the spell and in the process, fend off the reserve virus, which is none other than Plexton.
10	"Que Sera Servo"	Gino Tanasescu	Jymn Magon & Mark Zaslove	September 23, 1994
A fortune-telling game is infected by an unnamed Mega-Virus and it causes everyone's personalities to completely reverse. From this spell, Sam becomes a wimp, Tanker becomes a nerd, Amp becomes a man of Zen, and Sydney becomes a punk. Amp catches this and uses Sydney's belt to break through the fortune game, allowing them to reboot and save Servo. Afterwards, Malcolm gets his comeuppance by the teens and is shoved in his own locker.
11	"A Break in the Food Chain"	Adam Weissman	Jymn Magon & Mark Zaslove	September 26, 1994
Malcolm creates the Hock virus and sends him into the food factories for the purpose of stopping shipments of food to the world that needs it. At school, the lack of food begins to drive a ravenous Tanker insane with hunger. Sydney suspects that something is wrong and Servo is sent to defeat the monster.
12	"Ashes to Ashes Disk to Disk"	Adam Weissman	Jymn Magon & Mark Zaslove	September 27, 1994
The Troid virus which has been sent into Jennifer's pom-poms, random victims are stored on floppy disks. Malcolm finds the trapped victims in the floppy disk annoying and demands Kilokahn to find a better place for them. Sam is the only person he knows that is left, and must find a way to bring the people back. Due to Elizabeth playing around with the electrical pom-poms, Sam is able to deduce that his friends and the other trapped victims have been captured by Kilokahn and goes in as Servo to fight Troid to save them.
13	"Lights, Camera, Action"	Brad Kreisberg	Jymn Magon & Mark Zaslove	September 28, 1994
Sam learns just how dependent he is on his friends when he is sucked into a video camera thanks to the Kord virus and nearly goes insane from the prolonged enforced solitude. Sydney is able to deduce where Sam is and helps him out.
14	"Sweet and Sour Kilokahn"	Adam Weissman	Jymn Magon & Mark Zaslove	September 29, 1994
Sydney installs a children's computer program and is able to use it on Kilokahn, turning him from evil to good. When Malcolm discovers the good Kilokahn, he is infuriated but attempts to take on life as a good-natured fellow, only to fail miserably until he tricks him into bringing the Hock virus to life.
15	"To Sleep, Perchance to Scream"	Adam Weissman	Jymn Magon & Mark Zaslove	September 30, 1994
After Sam has a strange nightmare, Kilokahn seizes this opportunity to send the Nightmare Virus into Sam's alarm clock which gives Sam continuous nightmares. His friends come to his aid and help him defeat the Nightmare Virus.
16	"Out of Sight, Out of Time"	Adam Weissman	Jymn Magon & Mark Zaslove	October 3, 1994
In order to make Sam miss a date with Jennifer, Malcolm creates a Mega-Virus called Krono that will render time meaningless around the world, messing clocks all over the world.
17	"Money for Nothin' & Bits for Free"	Gino Tanasescu	Jymn Magon & Mark Zaslove	October 4, 1994
Malcolm taps into bank accounts across the country, making him incredibly rich while everyone else struggles to pay for necessities, thanks to Kilokahn's newest virus Cronick. He uses his money to bribe his schoolmates into doing embarrassing things. Sam takes the high road and avoids asking Malcolm for money, until his little sister Elizabeth gets in an accident and needs a surgery. Sydney catches this, allowing Sam and Tanker to destroy the Cronick virus and return everything to normal. Malcolm gets his comeuppance in the end where he is beaten up by the soccer team.
18	"Water You Doing?"	Adam Weissman	Jymn Magon & Mark Zaslove	October 5, 1994
After Malcolm's dramatic reading of Coleridge's "The Rime of the Ancient Mariner" is shunned at the school talent show, Malcolm enacts thematic revenge by having the Nixtor virus turn all the water in the city into hydrochloric acid. Also, Tanker learns the danger of bingeing on dill pickles, suffers from severe stomach pain, and learns where his limits lie.
19	"Just Brown & Servo"	Adam Weissman	Jymn Magon & Mark Zaslove	October 6, 1994
Desperate to prove to Jennifer that he is romantic, Sam plans a romantic dinner for the two of them. When he lets Tanker, Sydney, Amp, and Mrs. Starkey help him out, however, Malcolm overhears this and sends an upgraded Sybo into Mrs. Starkey's egg timer to make her go insane.
20	"My Virus Ate My Homework"	Adam Weissman	Jymn Magon & Mark Zaslove	October 7, 1994
Sam's report for school is destroyed by Elizabeth, and Sam feels he is about to face impending doom at school because of this. Meanwhile, Kilokahn, against Malcolm's wishes, releases the Thorned Virus to sound off an alarm system which will apparently trigger warheads throughout the globe.
21	"Hello Darkness, My Old Friend"	Brad Kreisberg	Jymn Magon & Mark Zaslove	October 10, 1994
Amp is attempting to get in shape for a competition, and Malcolm creates a virus which Kilokahn brings to life behind Malcolm's back. This Mega-Virus Monster attempts to knock out all the electricity in the world and forward it to Kilokahn. When the lights go out, Amp needs to amp up his legs for an exercise bike that will provide enough power for Servo to face the virus.
22	"Born With a Jealous Mind"	Adam Weissman	Jymn Magon & Mark Zaslove	October 11, 1994
Sydney wins a date with superstar Chad Williams, leaving Tanker very jealous. Sam tries to convince him not to be jealous. Meanwhile, Malcolm attempts revenge at the people of Japan, where his new hard drive came. It ate his disk and severely messed up his hand after attempting to eat it as well. He sends out a Smog Virus to harm the people. Sam catches this and goes in as Servo, but when Servo is nearly defeated, Tanker must overcome his jealousy long enough to help him defeat the Smog Virus as Drago.
23	"Cheater, Cheater, Megabyte Eater"	Adam Weissman	Jymn Magon & Mark Zaslove	October 12, 1994
Malcolm creates a Stupid Virus in order to tamper with the National Scholastic Placement Test's scores at high school and Principal Pratchert accuses Amp of tampering with the scores. Sydney catches on and Sam defeats the virus. This results in Syd and Amp tied for the highest score while Malcolm gets low scores on his test.
24	"Romeo & Joule-watt"	Adam Weissman	Jymn Magon & Mark Zaslove	October 13, 1994
Tanker and Jennifer are cast as Romeo and Juliet in the school play, much to Sam's and Sydney's dismay. Malcolm upgrades the Cronick virus and sends him into the school's stage lights. Sam goes in as Servo, but is nearly defeated thanks to the upgrades that Malcolm gave to Cronick. Sydney goes in as Drago to help Sam defeat Cronick.
25	"Rock 'n' Roll Virucide"	Adam Weissman	Jymn Magon & Mark Zaslove	October 14, 1994
A Rock n' Roll Virus is created to turn Mrs. Starkey into a heavy Rock n' Roll maniac when Malcolm sends it into her tape player.
26	"Stiff as a Motherboard"	Adam Weissman	Jymn Magon & Mark Zaslove	October 17, 1994
Malcolm creates the Manfu virus and sends it into the school's water fountain, causing whoever touches it to become stiff and unable to move or speak. That victim is Sam and it is up to his friends to help him out on that.
27	"Pride Goeth Before a Brawl"	Brad Kreisberg	Jymn Magon & Mark Zaslove	October 18, 1994
Kilokahn no longer wants Malcolm's help in making viruses, so he turns to the first computer user he can find, which is Sydney. He gets her to create her own virus for Servo to fight, against Sydney's wishes as she planned to create it as an anti-virus. After a bit of confusion, it seemed as if the virus would not cause any harm after all, until a jealous Malcolm turns the virus completely evil and forces Kilokahn to return to him. Sydney, feeling responsible, aids Servo in defeating the virus by piloting the Drago system in order to create Phormo.
28	"Starkey in Syberspace"	Adam Weissman	Jymn Magon & Mark Zaslove	October 19, 1994
Sam disguises himself as a girl in order to break into Sydney's club at school, but then he is discovered by Mrs. Starkey. After Sam runs out, Starkey snoops around on Sydney's laptop and is accidentally sucked into Syberspace, inside one of the Syber-Squad's vehicles, Drago. Meanwhile, Kilokahn forces Malcolm to study how his viruses always lose to the Servo Program and they discover the weak link in the Servo Program's line of defense. Malcolm does all he can to help aid the Raedon virus and put up a wall to prevent Servo from seeking aid, but is foiled by Starkey who is already in the digital world fighting the virus and Sam as Servo. Afterwards Sam and Tanker owe Sydney an apology for their behavior. She forgives them on the grounds they also must apologize to Mrs. Starkey as well. When Sam goes to apologize, he hears her telling him she had this weird dream about piloting a digital jet and actually enjoyed it.
29	"Hair I Stand, Head in Hand"	Adam Weissman	Jymn Magon & Mark Zaslove	October 20, 1994
Malcolm revamps the Plexton virus and sends it into Sam's blow dryer. After water is dumped on his head from Elizabeth's prank, Sam is forced to use the dryer, only to have it turn his hair into a whole messy field of static electricity.
30	"Portrait of the Artist as a Young Virus"	Brad Kreisberg	Eric Beetner & James Rowley	October 21, 1994
Malcolm creates a virus with the intent of altering the high school students' new schedules to schedules with undesirable classes, as well as putting him in all the same classes as Jennifer. Sydney catches on to Malcolm's plan and sends both Sam and Tanker to take out the virus.
31	"The Taunt Heard Round the World"	Adam Weissman	Jymn Magon & Mark Zaslove	October 24, 1994
Kilokahn sends out a global taunt via television to Servo to fight against the upgraded Hock virus, now the Hockinator, or else all television stations around the world would be shut down permanently.
32	"Tanks for the Memories"	Adam Weissman	Don Gillies	October 25, 1994
When Nixtor is sent into Tanker's walkman and headphones, Tanker's memories are affected as a result, introducing random and fictional memories, which distract the teens from the real danger in Syberspace. Luckily, Sam and Sydney catch on and they stop Nixtor.
33	"Love Me Don't"	Adam Weissman	Jymn Magon & Mark Zaslove	October 26, 1994
Malcolm sends a virus that resembles a non-armored version of Krono into a music box, hoping that when Jennifer opens it, she would fall in love with the first person she would see, which is Malcolm. Sam is very angry when he feels that Jennifer is hoping to dump him for Malcolm and retreats to his own room. Mrs. Starkey opens the box and she chases after Malcolm in love. Sydney and Tanker suspect a virus is in the box. They appeal to Sam to help Malcolm and Mrs. Starkey. He refuses to help, believing that Malcolm got what he deserved with Starkey chasing after him for stealing Jennifer away and the other cruel things he did to Sam. Amp wisely convinces Sam to let go of his grudge and destroy the virus in order to break the horrid love spell. Eventually, Jennifer reconciles with Sam and she is able to explain that she merely asked Malcolm to help with the decorations for Yoli's surprise birthday party. She also explains that had she asked Sam, they would never get anything done because all they would think about is being with each other. Malcolm is further frustrated when Kilokahn reveals that it was part of his plan to teach Malcolm a lesson in ordering him around.
34	"Syberteria Combat"	Adam Weissman	Damon Henry	October 27, 1994
Malcolm resurrects the Manfu virus to create a barrier around the high school, which imprisons the gang, who is staying after school. Tensions fly for the gang as the time goes stuck together and they begin verbally attacking one another.
35	"Over the River and Through the Grid"	Adam Weissman	Jymn Magon & Mark Zaslove	October 28, 1994
Mrs. Starkey is disheartened that she cannot attend an annual Thanksgiving motorcycle trip with her friends due to the Stupid Virus cutting all her utilities. Sam and the others form an impromptu play and meal in her honor, but they must figure out how to entertain Mrs. Starkey and stop the Stupid Virus at the same time.
36	"Do Not Reboot Til Christmas"	Adam Weissman	Jymn Magon & Mark Zaslove	December 13, 1994
It is Christmas time and everyone but Malcolm is into the holiday spirit, preparing for the charity toy drive. Malcolm decides to take his rage out on them by sending the Smog Virus into the battery-powered toys and set them to explode at midnight.
37	"Kilo Is Coming to Town"	Adam Weissman	Jymn Magon & Mark Zaslove	December 20, 1994
After the destruction of the Smog Virus, Malcolm and Kilokahn track Servo's home data stack to within a 6-mile radius of Malcolm's computer. Knowing he is close, Kilokahn sends Malcolm out to set up the town with Christmas lights to give Kilokahn the power to pinpoint their enemy. When he finds and erases the minds of Tanker, Syd and Amp, he turns against Malcolm. When Sam is knocked out cold and unable to become Servo, Malcolm realizes what he has done. Now determined to help save Christmas and the world, Malcolm assists in transferring Sam's mind to Servo and goes on one last mission to destroy Kilokahn. When he destroys the Samurai vehicles, Malcolm and Jennifer watch and hope that Servo can save the day once again.
38	"Hide and Servo"	Adam Weissman	Jymn Magon & Mark Zaslove	December 27, 1994
A power surge is created in Syberspace, and when Sam uses the computer to investigate, he, as Servo, is thrust through Syberspace in a rapid, endless, and uncontrollable flight. Because of this, Kilokahn advises Malcolm not to make use of Syberspace. Throughout the day, Sydney keeps hearing his calls for help everywhere she is, though Tanker and Amp don't believe her at first. Until that is, they hear it too and investigate. If Servo is to escape, Plexton awaits him as Kilokahn's Mega-Virus choice for confronting Servo. Eventually, Servo defeats Plexton who retreats.
39	"Little Ditch, Big Glitch"	Adam Weissman	Jymn Magon & Mark Zaslove	January 3, 1995
With the help of a television screen and the upgraded Kord virus, Kilokahn sets out to put everyone in North Valley High School under his power.
40	"Hasta la Virus, Baby!"	Adam Weissman	Jymn Magon & Mark Zaslove	January 10, 1995
In this clip show, Amp is supposedly in trouble and gone from school and the gang, Yolanda and Jennifer recall past experiences with Amp. It is revealed that Amp is back in outer space and later, the gang witnesses the arrival of surfer Lucky London, who would become the newest member of Team Samurai.
41	"Give 'Til It Megahertz"	Adam Weissman	Michael Patrick Dobkins	January 17, 1995
Malcolm resurrects the Kord virus and uses him to turn people into a bunch of overly generous people, including the gang of Team Samurai. Sam and Sydney are not affected and are able to bring Lucky and Tanker back to their senses to defeat the virus and turn everything back to normal.
42	"The President's a Frink!"	Adam Weissman	Hugh Mann	January 24, 1995
Malcolm uses the Skorn virus in order to win the student body presidential election over Yolanda Pratchert. Principal Pratchert is put in a bind when he is asked to recount the votes, but can't or he would show favoritism, causing a rift between father and daughter. He eventually decides to do the right thing when Mrs. Starkey suspects that the voting was rigged. Meanwhile, Sam and the others go to battle the virus.
43	"Beep My, Beep My Baby"	Adam Weissman	Don Gillies	January 31, 1995
Sybo is sent into Jennifer's pager by Malcolm that gives off a hypnotic beep that he hopes will convince Jennifer that she does not like Sam, but Malcolm. Kilokahn is against it and makes him realize that if Servo frees her, she will realize what is going on and they would be exposed. Malcolm, in a moment of humanity, convinces Jennifer to leave him and return to her normal life.
44	"Forget You!"	Adam Weissman	Robert G. Lillie	February 7, 1995
The Skeleton virus is created that causes everyone affected to forget everything, and even who they are. Sam is the only one who retains his memory due to having the Servo device on his wrist and helps his friends long enough to regain their memories to stop the virus as Syncro.
45	"Loose Lips Sink Microchips"	Adam Weissman	Damon Henry	February 14, 1995
Malcolm resurrects Skorn and sends him into Sam's radio show at school, causing embarrassing secrets to be revealed about people, including Sydney and Tanker's secrets. Sam must face Skorn and stop him once more in order to stop the leak at the station before Lucky spills the beans about Team Samurai and Servo.
46	"It's Magic"	Adam Weissman	James Iver Matterson	February 21, 1995
Lucky decides to incorporate the concept of Sam disappearing into Syberspace behind a curtain as a part of his magic act at school. After the first part of the trick works, the second part does not, since Sam, as Servo, is stuck fighting the Cronick virus again thanks in part to Malcolm's sabotage.
47	"Pratchert's Radical Departure"	Brad Kreisberg	Don Gillies	February 28, 1995
Malcolm decides to use a virus in order to mentally bring Principal Pratchert back to his hippie days, much to Lucky's pleasure, but Pratchert's job is on the line as a school inspector named Mr. Lapel is due to arrive and cannot walk in on a classroom strike led by the principal.
48	"Foreign Languages"	Brad Kreisberg	Gary Glasberg	March 7, 1995
Trembulor is upgraded for the purpose that, whenever Servo is fighting him, no one will be able to hear Servo's calls for help if he gets into a jam. Luckily, Sydney thinks she hears him everywhere she goes and Tanker uses Drago to rescue him.
49	"Truant False"	Adam Weissman	Michael Patrick Dobkins	March 14, 1995
When Hock is sent into the school computer in order to tamper with the summer school program files, the school sends an anti-virus system to destroy him. Then Kilokahn alters the anti-virus to look like Manfu - and turn him evil - to get Servo to try to destroy it, not knowing what consequences would lie in wait should the anti-virus be destroyed. Luckily Tanker catches it and convinces Sydney to use her skills without her reference manuals. She does and helps Sam both save the anti-virus and defeat Hock. This corrects the earlier mistake that leads to Malcolm attending summer school when it is revealed that he had been missing classes.
50	"Lucky's Unlucky Adventure"	Brad Kreisberg	Hugh Mann	March 21, 1995
Lucky is trying to save up money for a fantastic surf board, but is failing in several jobs. When Mrs. Starkey gives him a chance, the register mysteriously comes short on the exact amount Lucky needs for his new board. Now a fugitive on the run from the principal and the authorities, Sam and the others find out that Kord is responsible.
51	"What Rad Universe!"	Adam Weissman	Michael Patrick Dobkins	March 28, 1995
A power surge in Syberspace sends Sam into an alternate universe, where everyone he knows is different than from the universe he knows: Yolanda is a nasty individual who creates viruses for Kilokahn, Mrs. Starkey is French, Elizabeth is a child prodigy, Lucky is a prep, Tanker is autistic, Sydney is a cheerleader, Jennifer is a nerd, and Malcolm is a good-spirited guy who likes to help people. Sam must destroy the Hockinator virus in the alternate universe and find a way back home before it is too late.
52	"Syber-Dunk"	Adam Weissman	Hugh Mann	April 4, 1995
Sam, Tanker and Lucky try to get basketball superstar Charles "High Jump" Johnson to come to their school before a big game tonight by telling him there is a charity event. When High Jump finds out that it is all a scam, everyone cannot leave the school because of the Krono virus which created a barrier around the school. Because of this he will likely miss the game, unless the Syber-Squad, with the help of High Jump, can defeat the virus in order to send High Jump on his way.
53	"Take a Hike"	Brad Kreisberg	Jymn Magon & Mark Zaslove	April 11, 1995
While Sam is home spending time with Jennifer, Sydney, Tanker, Lucky and Yolanda are taking a camping trip out in nature. Malcolm then recreates the Krono-resembling virus that will remove all the electricity in the world. When the virus strikes, the gang finds themselves in a real dilemma because Sam is not present. Therefore, it is up to Tanker, in the unlikely role of Servo, to save the day.

== Home media ==
In 1995, Buena Vista Home Video (under the DIC Toon Time Video label) released the series on three two-episode VHS cassettes. In 2013, Mill Creek Entertainment released the series' first DVD volume in Region 1 for the very first time. The three-disc set features the first 28 episodes of the series. On October 1 in that year, Mill Creek released the second DVD volume which features the remaining 25 episodes.

== Online distribution ==
Five episodes (new episodes were added and old episodes were removed on Wednesdays) were available on Jaroo, which was an online video site then operated by Cookie Jar Entertainment with which DIC later merged. In or after 2013, Cookie Jar was taken over by DHX Media (now as WildBrain). The Jaroo site closed as a result, but DHX Media mentioned that it planned to re-locate the site, and its shows, for online distribution.

As of 2016, the series could be streamed through the Pluto TV app on the "After School Cartoons" channel 370.

== See also ==
- Mighty Morphin Power Rangers - a 90's series also adapted from a Japanese tokusatsu.
- Gridman the Hyper Agent - a Japanese tokusatsu counterpart of origin of this series.
- SSSS.Gridman - an anime series adaptation of Gridman the Hyper Agent; it makes references to Superhuman Samurai Syber-Squad through its SSSS title and the Neon Genesis Junior High students.
- SSSS.Dynazenon - a sequel to SSSS.Gridman.
