= Adventures in Babysitting =

1987 film by Chris Columbus

- Theatrical release poster by Drew Struzan
- Directed by: Chris Columbus
- Written by: David Simkins
- Produced by: Debra Hill; Lynda Obst
- Starring: Elisabeth Shue; Keith Coogan; Anthony Rapp; Maia Brewton
- Cinematography: Ric Waite
- Edited by: Fredric Steinkamp; William Steinkamp
- Music by: Michael Kamen
- Production companies: Touchstone Pictures; Silver Screen Partners III; Rose Productions
- Distributed by: Buena Vista Pictures Distribution
- Release date: July 3, 1987 (United States)
- Running time: 102 minutes
- Country: United States
- Language: English
- Box office: $34.4 million

Adventures in Babysitting (also known as A Night on the Town in certain countries) is a 1987 American teen comedy film written by David Simkins and directed by Chris Columbus in his directorial debut. It stars Elisabeth Shue, Keith Coogan, Anthony Rapp, and Maia Brewton, and features cameos by blues singer/guitarist Albert Collins and singer-songwriter Southside Johnny Lyon.

Adventures in Babysitting was released by Buena Vista Pictures Distribution on July 3, 1987. The film received mixed to positive reviews from critics and grossed $34.4 million. It is considered by some to be a cult classic.

== Plot ==
After her boyfriend Mike Todwell cancels their anniversary date, seventeen-year-old Chris Parker invites her friend Brenda to her Oak Park, Illinois house to cheer her up, but is convinced by her mother to babysit their neighbors' daughter, eight-year-old Sara Anderson, who idolizes the Marvel Comics hero Thor, while the parents attend a party in downtown Chicago. Later that evening, Chris receives a frantic call from Brenda, who ran away to a downtown bus station; Chris plans to pick her up, but is coerced by Sara, Sara's fifteen-year-old brother Brad, and Brad's best friend Daryl Coopersmith to take them with her. On the freeway, their station wagon suffers a flat tire, and they are picked up by a tow truck driver, "Handsome" John Pruitt, who offers to pay for the tire when Chris realizes that she left her purse at the Andersons'. En route, Pruitt receives a call from his boss, Dawson, with evidence that his wife is cheating on him. Pruitt rushes to his house to confront the infidelity; the car of Chris's mother is damaged when he accidentally shoots out the windshield while trying to kill his wife's lover. Chris and the kids hide in the adulterer's Cadillac, which car thief Joe Gipp then steals.

Reaching their hideout in the South Side, the kids realize that they have stumbled upon a multi-state car theft operation. They are detained in an upstairs office but escape. They enter a blues club where the band on stage refuses to let them leave until they perform a blues number. The group recounts the events of their evening while the band plays, causing the audience to sing along and applaud. They leave when Joe Graydon (the operation's second-in-command), and their boss, Bleak, arrive in the club, whose owners stall them.

After separating Daryl from a prostitute who is a 17 year old runaway, Chris is reminded of Brenda. They are found and chased again by Graydon and Bleak but escape on the Chicago "L" train and wind up in the middle of a gang fight. Brad is injured when one of the gang leaders throws a switchblade into his foot. They take Brad to University Hospital where, to his embarrassment/disappointment, he receives a single stitch. They run into Pruitt, who is now on the run from his earlier attacks; he says that he replaced the windshield, but Dawson wants $50 for the tire. The kids come across a fraternity house party. While there, a gentleman named Dan Lynch learns of Chris' problem and gets together $45 to give to her. He and Chris are obviously attracted to each other, and he offers to drive them to Dawson's Garage and drops them off there.

When they find Dawson, his blond hair and sledgehammer lead Sara to believe that he is Thor. He denies them their car because of the $5 shortage, but when Sara offers him her Thor helmet, he has a change of heart and releases their car. Meanwhile, Joe Gipp has told Bleak about their troubles, and the three are lying in wait for the kids. The kids pass the restaurant where Mike was supposed to take Chris and discover him there with another girl. Sara slips away to look at a toy store while Chris confronts Mike, who leaves Chris visibly hurt after downplaying their relationship. Brad stands up for Chris but is reluctant to hit Mike, so Daryl kicks Mike into a table, ruining his dinner and causing a commotion. Bleak spots Sara, and Graydon chases her to an office building where she hides; the others realize she is missing and follow, accidentally coming across the office party the Andersons are attending. After Sara climbs out an open window and slides down the building, with Graydon climbing out after her, Chris spots her and they run upstairs to help.

After the group pulls Sara from outside the window, Bleak intervenes. Joe knocks his boss unconscious, before giving him a Playboy magazine that Daryl had stolen, which contained important notes that the criminals wanted. The kids retrieve Brenda from the bus station and rush home, avoiding the Andersons on Interstate 290. Once home, Chris speedily cleans up the mess left earlier, settling on the sofa just as the Andersons enter. As Chris is leaving, Dan arrives with one of Sara's missing skates. With Sara's encouragement, Chris and Dan kiss.

A post-credits scene shows Graydon still stuck outside the building.

== Cast ==
- Elisabeth Shue as Christina "Chris" Parker, the babysitter of Brad & Sara
- Keith Coogan as Brad Anderson, Sara's older brother
- Maia Brewton as Sara Anderson, Brad's younger sister
- Anthony Rapp as Daryl Coopersmith, Brad's best friend
- Penelope Ann Miller as Brenda, Chris's best friend
- Bradley Whitford as Mike Todwell, Chris's boyfriend
- Calvin Levels as Joe Gipp, car thief
- George Newbern as Dan Lynch, Chris's love interest and a college student
- John Chandler as Bleak, a mob boss
- Ron Canada as Graydon, Bleak's second in command
- John Ford Noonan as "Handsome" John Pruitt
- Dan Ziskie as Robert Anderson, Brad & Sara's father
- Linda Sorensen as Joanna Anderson, Brad & Sara's mother
- Albert Collins as himself; a player in a Chicago Blues club
- Vincent D'Onofrio as Dawson
- Southside Johnny as band leader at frat party
- Lolita Davidovich as Sue Ann
- Clark Johnson as gang leader
- Andrew Shue as guy at frat party

== Production ==
Writer David Simkins was working for New World Pictures when he read a copy of the script for Ferris Bueller's Day Off. Simkins said he wanted to do a teen film in the vein of that film and After Hours, a story which told the series of misadventures over a limited time period. He pitched the idea to New World who did not want to make it. Simkins wrote the script and sold it to Paramount. It was assigned to producers Lyda Obst and Debra Hill and Simkins credits them with being of great assistance on the script.

For his directorial debut, Columbus said he reviewed 100 scripts. He chose Adventures in Babysitting because he felt comfortable with its scale. Paramount Pictures had a right of first refusal but demanded Molly Ringwald be cast in the lead. Touchstone Pictures agreed to make the film after The Walt Disney Company received $300 million in financing from Silver Screen Partners. Over 150 actresses auditioned for the lead role in Dallas, Florida, New York City, Toronto, Chicago, and Los Angeles, including Valerie Bertinelli. Columbus cast Elisabeth Shue, who was a student at Harvard University at the time.

Simkins says when the project was at Paramount they wanted Molly Ringwald who turned down the film. He says the studio then proposed Cher and Bette Midler as possible stars. He says when they saw Elisabeth Shue they knew she was the actress they wanted but they still saw a lot of alternatives before offering her the role.

Simkins says the idea of the singing scene at the Blues House came from Chris Columbus.

Principal photography began in Toronto on January 5, 1987. Many of the scenes shot there doubled for the film's setting of Chicago. Production designer Todd Hallowell simulated Chicago streets by adding trash, and reconstructed two stories of the Associates Center skyscraper in the city for the film's iconic shot of the characters dangling out of it. However, there would also be some location shots in Chicago at landmarks such as the Chicago "L", Fitzgerald's Nightclub, Lower Wacker Drive, the Chicago Expressway, Wolf Point. Some special effects shots also took place in Los Angeles. Ric Waite later confirmed that he shot the film using techniques similar to a drama rather than a comedy in order to highlight the film's unpredictable tone.

== Release ==
The film earned $34.4 million in the United States, which the Los Angeles Times attributed to a new ad campaign.

=== Home media ===
Adventures in Babysitting was the first Walt Disney movie to have a PG-13 rating.

The film has been released on VHS and Betamax, LaserDisc, DVD and Blu-ray formats. In the United States, it received a VHS release by Touchstone Home Video on July 14, 1988. It was released on DVD for the first time on January 18, 2000, by Touchstone Home Video. A 25th anniversary edition Blu-ray was released on August 7, 2012.

Although it may still be referred to as A Night on the Town on television airings in the United Kingdom, the film was released on rental VHS in the UK under its original title. The VHS was re-released on October 21, 2002, in the United Kingdom by Cinema Club and it received a 15 certificate by the BBFC for strong language and sexual references. It was previously released in an edited PG certificate for family viewing. It was released on DVD in the United Kingdom on May 31, 2004, again uncut like the 15 certificate VHS. It has since been reduced to a 12 certificate.

The PG version streams on Disney+, where a notice advises it has been edited for content, primarily removing strong and offensive language, including multiple replacements of the offensive slur ‘homo’ with the word ‘weirdo’.

=== Soundtrack album ===
In 2015, Intrada Records released an album from the film, featuring the score by Michael Kamen, including unused music and several of the songs heard in the film. It features "Then He Kissed Me" by the Crystals, "Babysitting Blues" by Albert Collins, "Twenty-Five Miles" by Edwin Starr, and "Just Can't Stop" by Percy Sledge.

==== "Babysitting Blues" song ====
In a 2021 interview in New York Magazine, Elisabeth Shue said performing the "iconic Babysitting Blues song," written by pop songwriter Mark Mueller and Robert Kraft, was one of her "favorite experiences of all time."

== Reception ==
On Rotten Tomatoes, the film holds an approval rating of 73% based on 48 reviews. The site's consensus states: "Sweet and spry, Adventures in Babysitting gets by on its amiable tone." On Metacritic, the film has a weighted average score of 45 out of 100, based on 11 critics, indicating "mixed or average" reviews.

Roger Ebert of the Chicago Sun-Times gave Adventures in Babysitting two-and-a-half out of four stars. He cited the blues club sequence as the movie's best scene, but criticized the film for not doing more with its black characters. He said the movie had "good raw material," but too many "unrealized possibilities." Gene Siskel of the Chicago Tribune rated the film three out of four stars, calling it "a genial, warm-hearted romp." He praised the performances of the young cast and called Elisabeth Shue "earnestly appealing," but criticized the movie for a lack of "social awareness." Both critics compared the film to Risky Business and Ferris Bueller's Day Off.

== Unsold television pilot ==
Adventures in Babysitting
- Genre: Sitcom
- Based on: Adventures in Babysitting
- Written by: Greg Antonacci; David Simkins
- Directed by: Joel Zwick
- Starring: Jennifer Guthrie; Joey Lawrence; Courtney Peldon; Brian Austin Green; Ariana Mohit; Susan Blanchard; Dennis Howard
- Opening theme: "Just Can't Stop" by Percy Sledge
- Composers: Dan Foliart; Howard Pearl
- Country of origin: United States
- Original language: English
- No. of episodes: 1

Production
- Executive producers: Greg Antonacci; Debra Hill; Lynda Obst
- Producer: David Simkins
- Cinematography: Mikel Neiers
- Editor: Ed Cotter
- Camera setup: Multi-camera
- Running time: 30 minutes
- Production companies: Touchstone Television; Antonacci Productions; Hill/Obst Productions

Original release
- Network: CBS
- Release: July 7, 1989

The film was adapted into an unsold television pilot of the same name for CBS in 1989. The pilot was broadcast on Friday night, July 7 in the 8 p.m. timeslot. It starred Jennifer Guthrie as Chris, Joey Lawrence as Brad, Courtney Peldon as Sara, Brian Austin Green as Daryl, and Ariana Mohit as Brenda. The pilot garnered CBS a 6.9 rating and was watched by 9.7 million viewers.

=== Main Cast ===
- Jennifer Guthrie as Christina "Chris" Parker
- Joey Lawrence as Brad Anderson
- Brian Austin Green as Daryl Coopersmith
- Courtney Peldon as Sara Anderson
- Ariana Mohit as Brenda
- Susan Blanchard as Joanna Anderson
- Dennis Howard as Robert Anderson

=== Recurring Cast ===
- Art Evans as Mr. Dukeman
- Rocky Giordani as Vince
- Jason Tomlins as Rick

== Remake ==
In 2016, a loose remake of the film, also titled Adventures in Babysitting, premiered on the Disney Channel in the United States. The film stars Sabrina Carpenter and Sofia Carson as competing babysitters.
