= Jane A. Rogers =

American actress

- Occupations: Television & film actress

Jane A. Rogers is an American actress most known for her role as Dr. Heather Donnelly on NBC's soap opera Santa Barbara. She portrayed the role from 1988 to 1989. She had a short-term role as Celeste on General Hospital in 1987, she also played Julie Delorean on The Bold and the Beautiful from 1990 to 1992.

== Filmography ==
=== Film ===
Year	Title	Role	Notes
1982	Purple Haze	Cora	
1994	Object of Obsession	Angie	
1995	Indecent Behavior III	Kelly Gibson	

=== Television ===
Year	Title	Role	Notes
1984	Falcon Crest	Karen Winslow, Duty Nurse	3 episodes
1985	Knots Landing	Linda	Episode: "The Christening"
1986	T. J. Hooker	Girl	Episode: "The Night Ripper"
1988–1989	Santa Barbara	Dr. Heather Donnelly	197 episodes
1990–1991	The Bold and the Beautiful	Julie Delorean	100 episodes
1993, 1996	Renegade	Miss Kramer / Gabby Green	2 episodes
1995	Dream On	Rachel	Episode: "The Weekend at the College Didn't Turn Out Like They Planned"
1996	The Colony	Deputy Kerwood	Television film
1996	Hot Line	Maureen	Episode: "E-Mail"
1996	Silk Stalkings	Deputy DA Gloria Sherwood	Episode: "When She Was Bad"
1997	Knots Landing: Back to the Cul-de-Sac	Lily Corsino	2 episodes
1997	Beverly Hills, 90210	Jane Schultze	2 episodes
2001	7th Heaven	Serena	5 episodes
2001	Philly	Mrs. Stein	Episode: "Live and Leg Die"
2002	NYPD Blue	Victoria Golden	Episode: "Less Is More"
2006	Close to Home	Nicole Philby	Episode: "Hot Grrrl"

=== Video games ===
Year	Title	Role
1995	Wing Commander IV: The Price of Freedom	Transport Pilot
1997	Eraser - Turnabout	Priscilla Kent
2000	The Exterminators	Prof. Rosepetal
