= David Simkins =

American screenwriter and television producer

- Education: University of Iowa
- Occupations: screenwriter, film producer
- Television: Adventures in Babysitting; The Adventures of Brisco County, Jr. Warehouse 13
- Website: davidsimkinsmw.com

David Simkins is an American screenwriter and television producer. His first produced screenplay was for the film Adventures in Babysitting in 1987. He has written for and produced television shows such as Charmed, Blade: The Series, Dark Angel and Warehouse 13.

== Early life and education ==
Simkins grew up in South Bend, Indiana. He attended Clay High School, where, in 1973, he start being active in the production of the Junior Achievement-sponsored comedy series Beyond Our Control. Simkins learned the basics of television production on the series, which was broadcast locally on WNDU-TV. After graduating high school in 1977, he studied film and broadcasting at The University of Iowa, earning a bachelor's degree in 1982.

== Career ==
He moved to Los Angeles, California, and got his first job at Sandy Howard Productions answering phones, and later reviewing and budgeting film scripts. Simkins told The South Bend Tribune, "That's where I learned how scripts were written … I learned how they came up with a budget." He later worked for a short period of time as a development executive for New World Pictures.

He has been an active writer and producer for television since his involvement with The Adventures of Brisco County, Jr. (1993–1994).

In 2022, Simkins was hired as coordinator and facilitator for the "Study Away: LA" program, a semester internship program for Rochester Institute of Technology's School of Film and Animation (SOFA).

== Filmography ==
The projects that Simkins has been involved with include:

Year	Title	Details	Role
1983	Deadly Force	Film	Production assistant
1984	Children of the Corn	Film	Production assistant
1987	Watching	TV Series	Studio vision
1987	Adventures in Babysitting	Film	Writer
1993	Micky Love	TV Movie	Technical adviser
1993 – 1994	The Adventures of Brisco County, Jr.	TV Movie	Producer
1993 – 1995	The Krypton Factor	TV Series	Technical supervisor
1995 – 1996	Lois & Clark: The New Adventures of Superman	TV Series	Writer; Creativity Consultant
1997 – 1998	Spy Game	TV Series	Writer; Supervising producer
1998	Mercy Point	TV Series	Writer; executive producer
1998 – 1999	Vengeance Unlimited	TV Series	Creator and Writer; Co-executive producer; Executive consultant
1999 – 2004	Charmed	TV Series	Writer and teleplay; Consulting and co-executive producer
2000	The Wonderful World of Disney	TV Series	Teleplay
2000 – 2001	FreakyLinks	TV Series	writer; executive and co-executive producer
2001	Dark Angel	TV Series	Writer; Consulting producer
2001 – 2002	Roswell	TV Series	Writer; Consulting producer
2002	Angel	TV Series	producers' assistant; showrunner (uncredited) and co-executive producer
2006	Blade: The Series	TV Series	Writer; Executive producer
2006	The Book of Daniel	TV Series	Co-executive producer
2007	The Dresden Files	TV Series	Writer; Executive and consulting producer
2008	Alien Raiders	Film	Writer
2010	Warehouse 13	TV Series	Teleplay writer; Executive producer
2010 – 2011	Human Target	TV Series	writer; co-executive producer
2012	Ray Bradbury's Kaleidoscope	Short	Creative consultant
2012	Grimm	TV Series	Writer; co-executive producer
2014	Graceland	TV Series	Writer; Co-executive producer
2015	The Lizzie Borden Chronicles	TV Mini Series	Story writer; Supervising producer
2016	Powers	TV Series	Writer; Co-executive producer
2016	Adventures in Babysitting	TV Movie	Writer; Story; co-producer
2018	Deprivers (in development)	TV Series	Writer
2019	Wu Assassins	TV Series	Writer; Co-executive producer
