= Parker Lewis Can't Lose =

American teen sitcom (1990–1993)

- Season 3 cast
- Also known as: Parker Lewis
- Genre: Teen sitcom
- Created by: Clyde Phillips; Lon Diamond
- Starring: Corin Nemec; Troy Slaten; Billy Jayne; Melanie Chartoff; Taj Johnson; Abraham Benrubi; Maia Brewton; John Pinette
- Composer: Dennis McCarthy
- Country of origin: United States
- Original language: English
- No. of seasons: 3
- No. of episodes: 73 (list of episodes)

Production
- Executive producer: Clyde Phillips
- Producers: Alan Cross; Russell Marcus; Larry Phillips; Larry Shaw; Bryan Spicer; John Ziffren
- Camera setup: Single-camera
- Running time: 30 minutes
- Production companies: Clyde Phillips Productions; Columbia Pictures Television

Original release
- Network: Fox
- Release: September 2, 1990 – June 13, 1993

Parker Lewis Can't Lose (rebranded simply as Parker Lewis for the third and final season) is an American teen sitcom that originally aired on Fox from September 1990 to June 1993. It was produced by Clyde Phillips Productions, in association with Columbia Pictures Television. The series depicts the tribulations of the title character Parker Lewis (played by Corin Nemec), a Santo Domingo High School student for whom nothing is impossible. It was strongly influenced by the feature film Ferris Bueller's Day Off.

== Premise ==
Parker Lewis Can't Lose features the title character as frequent narrator of episodes. Alongside Parker, Jerry Steiner and Mikey Randall are main characters whose primary focus through the show is fitting in. The show revolves around the experiences of these characters as they navigate the challenges of adolescence and strive for social acceptance within their high school. Their efforts are often thwarted by Parker's little sister, Shelly, and school principal Grace Musso.

The series focuses on the teenage lives of its characters and has a cartoon-like quality, though it is live action. Many episodes include references to pop culture, politics and celebrities. The surrealism was toned down in the series' final season, going as far as having Parker acknowledge this by breaking the fourth wall and 'canceling' one of the show's transitions.

== Episodes ==
Season	Episodes	Originally released	
Season	Episodes	First released	Last released
1	26	September 2, 1990	May 19, 1991
2	25	August 11, 1991	May 17, 1992
3	22	July 16, 1992	June 13, 1993

== Characters ==
=== Main ===
- Parker Lloyd Lewis (played by Corin Nemec) – Parker Lewis is very popular at school. A smart guy with a penchant for garish shirts and cutting classes, Parker usually has a plan up his sleeve, and it usually involves outsmarting someone else. Plans put into effect begin with the command: "Synchronize Swatches." He and his two best friends have their high-tech headquarters hidden above the gym. In the final season, Parker finally settles down with one girl, Annie, and appears more mature and less reliant on his former attitude.
- Michael Patrick "Mikey" Randall (played by Billy Jayne) – A rock and roll rebel without a cause and by far the most emotionally driven of the trio, he often quotes or paraphrases famous songs. For example, "To quote Don Henley, this is 'The End of the Innocence'" (episode two), or suggesting to "Paint It, Black" when Jerry betrays the group's trust. Mikey at one point considered dropping out of Santo Domingo HS when a prank by Shelly caused him to unknowingly play a love song, which he had composed for a girl he had feelings for, for the entire school.
- Jerry Steiner (played by Troy Slaten) – A stereotypical nerd. In the first two seasons, he wears a trench coat, said to be made by NASA, from which he produces a wide variety of objects, which are apparently held inside the coat with Velcro. He addresses everyone formally by last name, e.g., "Mr. Lewis", "Mr. Randall", and even "Mr. Kubiac", or collectively as "sirs". At the end of the credits of the pilot episode, Jerry hid in the locker next to Parker's, talking endlessly to Parker through the door, not knowing that he had left, causing him to plaintively call out: "Mr. Lewis? Mr. Randall? Mr. Phillips? (Clyde Phillips, the series' creator and executive producer) Hello?". One notable episode dealt with Parker and Mikey confiscating Jerry's trench coat in help him get to meet a potential girlfriend.
- Grace Musso (played by Melanie Chartoff) – Principal of Santo Domingo High. She is Parker's arch-nemesis. At 5 ft 5 in (1.65 m), she is said to be in her mid-thirties, but is actually older. She wants to get Parker expelled. She often breaks the glass on her office door when she makes her distinctive "thumb swoosh" gesture. She has a racy side which is sometimes exposed. Her turn-ons include beards and large hands. She was portrayed as a spinster at first, but seemed to have a skill with men, one time having dated an officer of each of the armed forces. She has many secrets which she would rather be kept quiet, such as living in a $600,000 house on a $38,000 a year salary (episode six), which Parker uses as the necessity arises. Parker's blackmail ideas sometimes backfired on him; one of his actions resulted in Musso's suspension. When a tougher headmaster is brought in to replace her, Parker must find out a way to get her back now that it is gone "from bad to worse".
- Shelly Ann Lewis (played by Maia Brewton) – Parker's other nemesis, his little sister, who attends the same school as a freshman. She likes to manipulate teachers and parents to her benefit and tries to get Parker into trouble. Shelly also teams up with Musso if she sees a chance to ruin Parker. She is on friendly terms with Jerry and the two seem to end up in a constant relationship at the end of the series. Her favorite saying is: "My brother is a dead man!" whenever she finds an opportunity to bring Parker into an embarrassing situation. She has a tendency to call out "Mom!" when Parker gets one over on her, as seen at the start or end of various programs.
- Martin Lloyd "Marty" Lewis (played by Timothy Stack) – Parker and Shelly's father, he owns a video rental store called Mondo Video with his wife, and is helped by Parker and Shelly on weekends. He tries hard to keep some of the coolness that he had in his own school days when he was a self-described "young hoodlum". It is shown that he graduated from Santo Domingo High School and had two friends who were similar to Jerry and Mikey. Marty has also played mean pranks on Principal Musso, who had been a classmate of his at Santo Domingo, hence explaining Musso's resentment of Parker. The role of Mr. Lewis was played by Sherman Howard in the pilot episode.
- Judy Lewis (played by Anne Bloom in season one and Mary Ellen Trainor in the pilot episode and seasons two and three) – Parker and Shelly's mother, she can be loving and gentle, but if her family is threatened, she is ready for battle.
- Francis Lawrence "Larry" Kubiac III (played by Abraham Benrubi) – Known as "Kube", at 6 ft 7 in (2.01 m) tall and 270 pounds (120 kg) in weight, he is built like a dinosaur with a brain to match, yet with a surprisingly sweet disposition. While walking, Kubiac causes earth tremors. His favorite line is, "Eat now?" In the series' beginning, he was introduced as a pure bully, aggressive and hostile towards other characters, but within a few episodes, his character changed into a more benign and friendly "gentle giant", and he quickly became a helpful character who would often assist Parker and his friends in their schemes. It is later revealed to Parker that Larry is more intelligent than he appears, and his dim-witted persona is merely an act.
- Franklin "Frank" Lemmer (played by Taj Johnson) – Principal Musso's ultra-conservative sidekick and "lapdog" with vampiric tendencies. He has been in school 16 years (episode nine), wears black, and seems to have a telepathic connection to the principal and is obsessed with war, strategy, and politics. Musso can summon him with a dog whistle. He is able to teleport at will. Despite him largely being an adversary to Parker, at one time Parker actually agreed to help Frank Lemmer win over a girl named Denise (Andrea Elson), who turns out to be a blood relative of Grace Musso's. He was absent without explanation in the show's final season.
- Annie Faith Sloan (played by Jennifer Guthrie) – She is Parker's love interest from the middle of the second season to the show's end. When Parker's parents were out of town one weekend, he invited Annie to his house with the intent to go all the way, only for Kubiac, Mikey, Jerry and others to show up to his house unannounced all at once and ruining his plans, but ultimately grateful when he learns Annie values abstinence.

=== Recurring ===
- Dr. Norman Pankow (played by Gerrit Graham in seasons one and two) – The principal of rival El Corrado High School with a doctorate in penology, he is Musso's primary adult rival and a devotee of the sculpting of bonsai trees. As tough as Musso is, Pankow is regarded as much worse. One of Parker's stunts caused Musso's suspension. When Dr. Pankow replaced her, Parker admits he got more than he bargained for and needed to bring about Musso's reinstatement.
- Nick Comstock (played by Paul Johansson) – Manager of the Atlas Diner during the second season, he is very attractive and possesses a supernatural ability to help people with their problems, often dishing out sage advice to Parker.
- Bradley 'Brad' Penny (played by Harold Pruett) – He appeared in the show's final season. He works as a bricklayer, and is athletic and good-looking. Parker sees him as a nemesis, but Brad often only wants to be friends, though misunderstandings come between them. Shelly is intrigued by him.
- Coach Hank Kohler (played by John Pinette). Joining during the show's final season, Hank Kohler served as a father figure for Larry Kubiac and the new owner of the Atlas Diner, which he eventually loses in the show's final episode, "The Last Supper". He is obsessed with Grace Musso, who is completely repulsed by him.

=== Notable guests and cameos ===
- Andrea Elson
- Barbara Billingsley
- Brian Austin Green
- Brittany Murphy
- Cassandra Peterson
- Curtis Armstrong
- Donny Osmond
- Gabrielle Carteris
- Harry Anderson
- Ian Ziering
- Jason Priestley
- Jennie Garth
- Jerry Mathers
- Josh Lucas
- Joyce Brothers
- Lindsay Price
- Luke Perry
- Michael Dorn
- Milla Jovovich
- Ozzy Osbourne
- Penny Johnson Jerald
- Phil Hartman
- Robert Zemeckis
- Ron Canada
- Ryan Stiles
- Scott Wolf
- Shannen Doherty
- Sharon Case
- Sonny Bono
- Stacy Haiduk
- Tori Spelling
- Taime Downe
- "Weird Al" Yankovic

== Production ==
The show was originally developed for CBS, but CBS rejected it, and Fox picked it up instead.

== Broadcast and syndication ==
The show premiered in syndication on September 14, 1993, on the USA Network. As of February 2009, minisodes are available on Crackle. In late 2015 the show is airing in syndication on the Family Network on Saturday mornings.

== Home media ==
On June 30, 2009, Shout! Factory released the complete first season of Parker Lewis Can't Lose on DVD in Region 1. The 4-DVD set includes special features including exclusive interviews with the cast, crew, and creators. Although the cast and crew discuss both Melanie Chartoff and her character, Grace Musso, Chartoff herself does not appear in any of the supplementary materials. Shout! Factory released Season 2 on January 26, 2010. All 3 seasons have been released on SD Blu-Ray (in DVD quality) in Germany in 2015.

DVD name	Ep #	Release date
The Complete First Season	26	June 30, 2009
The Complete Second Season	25	January 26, 2010

== Awards and nominations ==
Year	Award	Category	Recipient	Result
1991	Young Artist Award	Best New Family Television Comedy Series	Parker Lewis Can't Lose	Nominated
1991	Young Artist Award	Best Young Actress Starring in a New Television Series	Maia Brewton	Nominated
1991	Young Artist Award	Best Young Actor Supporting or Re-Occurring Role for a TV Series	Troy W. Slaten	Nominated
1992	Young Artist Award	Best Young Actor Starring in a Television Series	Corin Nemec	Nominated
1992	Young Artist Award	Best Young Actress Starring in a Television Series	Maia Brewton	Nominated
1993	Young Artist Award	Outstanding Young Comedian in a Television Series	Corin Nemec	Nominated
1993	Young Artist Award	Best Young Actress Co-starring in a Television Series	Maia Brewton	Nominated
1993	Young Artist Award	Best Young Actor Co-starring in a Television Series	Troy W. Slaten	Nominated

== Internet support ==
Parker Lewis was one of the first shows with fan support on the Internet. It was done through an email list called The Flamingo Digest. Several people from the list were invited to the set.

== Similar shows ==
- Lucy Lewis Can't Lose
- Saved by the Bell
