= Jennifer Guthrie =

American actress

- Occupation: Actress
- Years active: 1989–1998

Jennifer Guthrie is an American retired actress. She is best known for her role as Annie Sloan on TV's Parker Lewis Can't Lose.

== Early life ==
Guthrie is a native of Westchester, New York, who attended State University of New York at Cortland, where she studied theater.

== Filmography ==
Year	Title	Role	Notes
1989	Adventures in Babysitting	Chris Parker	Failed television pilot based on the 1987 film Adventures in Babysitting
1990	General Hospital	Dawn Winthrop	1990–1991
1991	Pink Lightning	Sharon	
1991	Parker Lewis Can't Lose	Annie Sloan	
1993	Beverly Hills, 90210	Katie Destable	2 episodes
1993	Renegade	Maryann Perry	Episode: "Wheel Man"
1994	Justice in a Small Town	Beth Tyler	
1995	Marker	Lawyer	1 episode
1995	Seinfeld	Lena	Episode titled "The Sponge".
1996	NYPD Blue	Dale Epton	Episode titled "The Nutty Confessor".
1996	Pacific Blue	Donna	Episode titled "Over the Edge".
1996	The Colony	Molly Lanford	Television Movie
1998	Sex and the City	Patience	Episode titled "Bay of Married Pigs".
1998	Sex and the City	Mother at baby shower	Episode titled "The Baby Shower".
