= List of MegaMan NT Warrior chapters =

The cover of the first tankōbon localized by Viz Media

MegaMan NT Warrior, known in Japan as Rockman.EXE (ロックマンエグゼ, Rokkuman.Eguze), is a Japanese manga series written and illustrated by Ryo Takamisaki. It was originally serialized in Shogakukan's monthly magazine, CoroCoro Comic. Its individual chapters were later into thirteen Tankōbon volumes released between July 2001 and November 2006. Viz Media licensed and released the thirteen volumes between May 2004 and February 2008. The series is based on the Mega Man Battle Network video game series and has also been adapted into an anime series by Xebec. The plot takes place in a futuristic world and follows Lan Hikari and his NetNavi MegaMan, a personal artificial intelligent being that resides in a device called a PET as they encounter the cyber-terrorist group the World Three.

== Volume list ==
No.	Original release date	Original ISBN	North America release date	North America ISBN
1	July 28, 2001	4-09-142871-1	May 19, 2004	1-59116-465-6
1. Viz. "Battle in the New Century! MegaMan" (新世紀バトル!!ロックマン, Shin Seiki Battle!! Rockman); 2. Viz. "Target MegaMan!!" (ねらわれたロック!!, Nerawareta Rock!!); 3. Viz. "Stop the Runaway Train!!" (暴走列車を止めろ!!, Bousou Ressha o Tomero!!); 4. Viz. "The FighterSword of Fury!!" (いかりのファイターソード!!, Ikari no Fighter Sword!!); 5. Viz. "FullSynchro Unleashed" (フルシンクロの力!!, Full Synchro no Chikara!!); Bonus Chapter Viz. "Lan and MegaMan, First Impressions" (熱斗とロック、2人の出会い, Netto to Rock, 2 nin no Deai)
Lan Hikari, a fifth grader, skips school and heads home as he expects to see his father after a long time. Disappointed, he returns to school, and finds it on fire due to school equipments malfunctioning. Learning that some students are trapped inside, Lan sends his NetNavi, MegaMan, to investigate the school's Cybernet and finds the NetNavi Fireman to be the cause. He defeats Fireman and the school is saved. The next day, Fireman and his operator, Mr. Match, prompts Lan to join him and defeat a security system. Lan obliges for the fun of Net-battling but defeats Fireman when Mr.Match reveals his plans to delete MegaMan. Later, a friend of Lan's is transferring school. Lan has MegaMan hijack a train as a farewell gift to his friend. However, the train almost crashes when it is infected with a virus, prompting MegaMan to delete it. Next, the cyber-terrorist group World Three attempts to brainwash the students at school. Lan sends MegaMan to defeat World Three's Numberman but loses consciousness after sustaining the same injuries MegaMan did in his battle. After testing Lan, the police reveal to him that he is one of the few who is able to reach FullSynchro, a state where the operator and his NetNavi combine into a single consciousness. They bequeath to him a Net-battler license granting him the right to send his Net-battle in public.
2	February 28, 2002	4-09-142872-X	June 30, 2004	1-59116-465-6
1. Viz. "The New Rival!!" (新ライバル・炎山の実力!!, Shin Rival Konoo Yama no Jitsuryoku!!); 2. Viz. "The Ultimate Partners!!" (最強コンビ復活!!, Saikyou Konbi Fukkatsu!!); 3. Viz. "World Three Activate!!" (WWW始動!!, WWW Shidou!!); 4. Viz. "Battleground: Silver Tower" (決戦!!シルバータワー, Kessen!! Silver Tower); 5. Viz. "Rescue MegaMan!!" (ロックを救出せよ!!, Rock o Kyuushutsu Seyo!!); 6. Viz. "Attaining True Power..." (真の強さを目指して..., Shin no Tsuyo sa o Mezashite...)
Lan receives a challenge from Chaud Blaze, a licensed Net-battler who is the same age as him. After being easily defeated by Chaud and his NetNavi ProtoMan, Lan and MegaMan train themselves to defeat him in the future. Meanwhile, Numberman's operator, Higsby, warns Lan of the World Three's next plan and urges him to intercept them. After defeating World Three's StoneMan, the World Three start a mass attack on the world's electronics. Lan's friend, Maylu Sakurai, asks him to save Yai Ayanokoji who has been trapped in her bathroom. After doing so, Chaud tells him the World Three has Lan's father, Yuichiro Hikari, hostage at Silver Tower. They infiltrate the tower and confront Dr. Wily, the leader of the World Three, who plans to use his creation, the Life Virus, to control the satellites in space to destroy the Earth. MegaMan defeats the Life Virus and is seemingly deleted in the process. Yuichiro arranges to send Lan into the Cybernet to retrieve the unconscious MegaMan who has drifted into the Undernet. After reviving MegaMan, he tells Lan he wants to become stronger to face the powerful enemies he sensed while drifting through the Undernet. Later, Lan's friend, Dex Ogreon, is challenged Maysa who believes Dex to be Lan. Before Dex's NetNavi, GutsMan, is deleted, Lan and MegaMan intervene and defeat Maysa's NetNavi SharkMan.
3	July 27, 2002	4-09-142873-8	September 7, 2004	1-59116-414-1
1. Viz. "A Creeping Black Shadow!!" (しのびよる黒い影, Shinobiyoru Kuroi Kage); 2. Viz. "To the New World with FullSynchro!" (フル・シンクロで新世界へ!!, Full Synchro de Shin Sekai he!!); 3. Viz. "The Vow to the "Strongest"" ("最強"への誓い, "Saikyou" he no chikai); 4. Viz. "To the Furthest Reaches of the Cybernet" (進め、電脳の彼方へ!, Susume, Dennou no Kanata he!); 5. Viz. "Chase the Mystery Upgrade Parts!!" (謎の強化パーツを追え!!, Nazo no Kyouka Parts o oe !!); 6. Viz. "The Ultimate Four Warriors Materialize" (最強の四戦士、現る!!, Saikyou no yon Senshi, Genru!!)
MegaMan goes missing on the Cybernet forcing Lan to track his last known location which leads him to an antique shop. At the same time, MegaMan battles NetNavi Skullman who warns him he should not enter the Undernet if he can not beat him. Skullman's operator, Miyu, notices MegaMan has a human soul annulling her abilities to read his movements. Lan is later able to connect to MegaMan and gives him battle chips allowing him to defeat his opponent. Later at a restaurant, Lan and Chaud are attacked by remnants of the World Three. They pursue the enemies into the Undernet where they meet the NetNavi Bass. After being spared by him, NetNavi ShadowMan tells MegaMan to go to the place marked on the map to become more powerful. The next day, a Mettaur virus asks MegaMan to help him defeat a virus causing it havoc. After doing so, the Mettaur and its friends direct MegaMan to the location ShadowMan indicated. MegaMan enters a pyramid and meets PharoahMan who promises to give him power if he defeats four copies of himself. The four MegaMen each perform a Style-Change which overpowers the normal MegaMan.
4	December 25, 2002	4-09-142874-6	November 2, 2004	1-59116-465-6
1. Viz. "MegaMan vs Four MegaMen?!" (自分VS4人の自分!?, Jibun VS 4-nin no Jibun!?); 2. Viz. "Uncontrollable Super Evolution!!" (制御不能の超進化!!, Seigyo Funou no Chou Shinka!!); 3. Viz. "Power Out of Control!!" ("最強"への誓い, Bousou Suru Shikara); 4. Viz. "The Luxury Cruise Ship Trap!!" (豪華客船のわな, Gouka Kyakusen no Wana); 5. Viz. "The Ultimate Trump!!" (最強の切り札, Saikyou no Kirifuda); Bonus Chapter Rockman Fun Square (ロックマンエグゼ ファン・スクエア)
MegaMan defeats the four by Style-changing into Hub Style. Chaud, upon hearing the news, challenges Lan to a Net-battle. They are interrupted when Arashi Kazefuki and his NetNavi Airman attempts to delete MegaMan and ProtoMan. Arashi destroys Lan's PET and in a desperate attempt to save MegaMan, FullSynchros with him and Style-changes into Hub Style. A FullSynchro MegaMan goes on a rampage. As Lan's consciousness remains away for too long, his body begins to fail. Chaud then teams up with child prodigy Kei Yuki and succeeds in calming the rampant MegaMan and ends their FullSynchro. Later, Lan's class is invited to a Cruise Ship. However, it is a trap set by Cyber-terrorist Grave who intends to lure out MegaMan. Kei, the leader of Grave, sends the Grave virus to absorb MegaMan but is unable to overcome the Hub-Style's powers.
5	April 28, 2003	4-09-142875-4	January 5, 2005	1-59116-561-X
1. Viz. "Battle Fury!!" (激闘!! 伝説VS最強, Gekitou!! Densetsu VS Saikyou); 2. Viz. "The Scar That Won't Fade!!" (消えない傷あと, Kienai Kizuato); 3. Viz. "Gamble It on This One" (この1本にかけろ!!, Kono 1 hon ni Kakero!!); 4. Viz. "The Shock of Being Called Powerless!!" (衝撃の戦力外通告, Shougeki no Senryoku Gai Tsuukoku); 5. Viz. "The Crisis Right Now" (今そこにある危機, Ima Sokoni Aru Kiki)
Bass senses MegaMan's power a travels to the cruise ship's Cybernet to battle him. Bass's program allows him to obtain MegaMan's Hub Style and overpowers him. He is defeated when MegaMan finds an opening to Bass's defense. Later, a famous Net-battler instructor, Mr Famous, tests MegaMan and ProtoMan's capabilities. He deems them unfit and warns them a threat is coming to the world. Later, Lan's school is attacked by FireMan again. FireMan, using an unknown dark power, transforms into FlameMan. The dark powers prevents MegaMan from changing into Hub-Style. As FlameMan prepares to finish him off, MegaMan is saved by Aragoma Torakichi and his NetNavi KingMan.
6	October 28, 2003	4-09-142876-2	February 2, 2005	1-59116-755-8
1. Viz. "Crisis on the Movie!" (動きだした危機, Ugokidashi ta Kiki); 2. Viz. "Return of a Sworn Friend!" (消えない傷あと, Meiyuu, Fukkatsu!); 3. Viz. "The Destiny to Fight the Darkness!" (闇と闘う宿命, Yami to Tatakau Shukumei); 4. Viz. "Arrival of the True Strongest!" (真の最強、現る, Shin no Saikyou, Genru); 5. Viz. "The Strength of Brotherhood!" (きずなの力..., Kizuna no Chikara...); Bonus Chapter Viz. "Bass – The Ultimate Proof" (フォルテ～最強の証～, Forte (Saikyou no Akashi))
After FlameMan is dispatched, Lan and MegaMan contemplate on Hub-Style's vulnerability to the dark powers. The next day, a dark dome surrounds the city causing the NetNavis to materialize in reality. Mr Famous brings Lan and MegaMan to a center where he is organizing Net-battlers to combat the threat. However, they are attacked by DesertMan who injures Mr Famous and his NetNavi Punk. They are saved when ProtoMan appears, having attained the powers of Muramasa-Style, given to him by the lord of the Undernet, Serenade. Chaud leads them to the center of the dome where they are attacked by BeastMan who is easily defeated by Chaud. Chaud and ProtoMan set off to face the darkness themselves while MegaMan and Lan are prevented access by Serenade. Eventually, the two break through Serenade's blockade and rendezvous with Chaud and ProtoMan as they face an unknown being.
7	March 27, 2004	4-09-142877-0	May 31, 2005	1-42150-003-5
1. Viz. "The Ultimate's Third Appearance!!" (最強、三たび現る!!, Saikyou, Santabi Genru !!); 2. Viz. "The Power of Believing in Each Other!!" (信じ合う強さ, Shinji au Tsuyosa); 3. Viz. "The Ties that Bind, Awaken!!" (目覚めよ、絆の力!!, Mezame yo, Kizuna no Chikara!!); 4. Viz. "Transformation! Protosoul!!" (変身！ ブルースソウル, Henshin! Blue's Soul); 5. Viz. "Freedom from Darkness!!" (闇からの解放...!!, Yami Kara no Kaihou...!!); Bonus Chapter Lit. "Story Ideas That Were Sealed" (封印されたアイディアの話, Fuuin sa re ta Aidia no Hanashi)
An upgraded Bass appears out of the unknown being and engages MegaMan and ProtoMan in battle. The two are overwhelmed but are saved by Serenade who sacrifices himself. A program left behind by him allows MegaMan to form a Double-Soul with Protoman allowing him to defeat Bass. In respect for Bass's honor during the battle, MegaMan offers a truce with him. However, Bass intercepts an attack by LaserMan aimed at MegaMan and captured as a result. A Dark MegaMan introduces himself and declares that the Dark Loids will spread the darkness throughout their world.
8	October 28, 2004	4-09-142878-9	September 12, 2005	1-59116-981-X
1. Viz. "Impact! The True DarkNavi Appears" (衝撃！ 真の闇のナビ登場, Shougeki! Shin no Yami no Nabi Toujou); 2. Viz. "The Other MegaMan?!" (もう一人のロック!?, Mou Ichinin no Rock!?); 3. Viz. "GutsMan, Swallowed by Darkness!!" (闇に飲まれたガッツマン!!, Yami ni Noma re ta GutsMan!!); 4. Viz. "MegaMan DS Revealed" (ロックマンDSの正体, Rockman DS no Shoutai); 5. Viz. "When Hate Becomes Power!!" (憎しみが力に変わるとき...!!, Nikushimi ga Chikara ni Kawaru Toki...!!); 6. Viz. "Counterattack of the Ultimate Duo!!" (最強コンビの反撃!!, Saikyou Konbi no Hangeki !!)
The dark dome recedes and NetNavis return to their PETs and the Cybernet. Soon after, the NetNavi SearchMan invades the Silver Tower Cybernet seeking MegaMan to avenge his comrades. They are able to rectify the misunderstanding by revealing the existence of Dark MegaMan. Later, MegaMan meets with NetNavi BubbleMan who promises to share information for a price. While MegaMan is gone, Dark MegeMan attacks his friends allowing LaserMan to call out GutsMan's Dark Soul and provoking him to attack MegaMan. MegaMan is able to help GutsMan break control and the two form a Double-Soul to force Dark MegaMan to flee. BubbleMan reveals the location of a black hole the Dark Loids used to enter their world. MegaMan enters in FullSynchro mode. However, their Synchro is broken and Lan's consciousness is abducted by ShadeMan. Giving into his hatred, MegaMan deletes ShadeMan causing Dark MegaMan to strengthen. SearchMan and his army attempt to defeat Dark MegaMan but are annihilated instead. Gravely injured, SearchMan gives MegaMan his strength allowing him to Double-Soul and confront Dark MegaMan whom absorbs Bass in the process.
9	February 28, 2005	4-09-142879-7	December 13, 2005	1-42150-132-5
1. Viz. "Eternal Darkness, The Ultimate Darksoul!!" (永遠の闇を...究極のDS!!, Eien no Yami o? Kyuukyoku no DS!!); 2. Viz. "Resurrection! Resonance of the Souls!!" (起死回生！ 魂の共鳴!!, Kishikaisei! Damashii no Kyoumei!!); 3. Viz. "The End!! The Proof MegaMan is MegaMan" (決着!! ロックマンである証, Kecchaku!! Rockman de aru Akashi); 4. Viz. "Friend or Foe?! Enter the Netopia Military!" (敵か味方か!? アメロッパ軍現る!, Teki ka Mikataka!? Ameroppa Gun Genru!); 5. Viz. "A Dangerous Man?! It's MegaMan!!" (危険な男!? ロックマン!!, Kiken na Otoko!? Rockman!!); 6. Viz. "MegaMan at Large?!" (ロックが指名手配!?, Rock ga Shimei Tehai!?)
MegaMan calls out to Bass, awakening him and relinquishing Dark MegaMan of his abilities. Still overpowered, Lan's friends send BubbleMan to heal SearchMan and ProtoMan. MegaMan and ProtoMan perform a Double-Soul and are able to overpower Dark MegaMan. Desperate to win, Dark MegaMan absorbs LaserMan gaining the ability to project a powerful barrier. With SearchMan's assistance, MegaMan is able to break through the barrier and delete Dark MegaMan. Bass bids farewell to MegaMan and leaves the scene. As more Dark Loids enter the world, the Netopia army led by NetNavi Colonel and his operator Baryl dispatch them and close up the portal to the Dark Cybernet. Days later, the Netopia army receives the order to imprison MegaMan fearing a potential Double-Soul between him and Bass would result in world destruction. MegaMan bids farewell to Lan and hides at BubbleMan's home. BubbleMan sells MegaMan out for the reward money and advises him to take a warp portal which leads him to Netopia.
10	September 28, 2005	4-09-142880-0	September 19, 2006	1-42150-749-8
1. Viz. "MegaMan Rescue Mission!!" (ロック大捜索作戦!!, Rock dai Sousaku Sakusen!!); 2. Viz. "A New Combo?" (新コンビ結成!?, Shin Konbi Kessei!?); 3. Viz. "MegaMan Captured" (捕獲されたロックマン!?, Hokaku Sareta Rockman!?); 4. Viz. "Approaching Darkness" (しのびよる闇, Shinobiyoru Yami); 5. Viz. "Activation! TomahawkSoul!!" (発動！ T・ソウル!!, Hatsudou! T-Soul!!); 6. Viz. "The Final Showdown Against Darkness" (闇との最終決戦, Yami to no Saishuu Kessen)
Lan heads to Netopia in search of MegaMan but wanders into a setup by the Netopia Military attempting to endanger his life. MegaMan falls for their bait and is lured out of hiding. However, one of the members is the Dark Loid CloudMan who plans to capture MegaMan. TomahawkMan appears and MegaMan performs a Double-Soul with him to defeat CloudMan. Colonel, upon learning the military has been infiltrated by the Dark Loids, has TomahawkMan escort MegaMan to his private army headquarters. Dark Loid CosomoMan, disguised as Bass, infiltrates and attempts to delete Colonel but is warded off by MegaMan. Believing he could be trusted, Baryl enlists Lan and MegaMan to join his private army and infiltrate Dr. Regal's servers deducing he is the mastermind behind the military infiltration. In retaliation, Regal unleashes the dark program Nebula Gray which threatens to absorb the Cybernet. The Netopia Military attempts to invade Regal's server but are wiped out by Nebula Gray. As Colonel prepares to combat it, Bass appears intending to do the same.
11	February 27, 2006	4-09-140075-2	March 6, 2007	1-42151-141-X
1. Viz. "Battle of the Biggest, Baddest Evils"; 2. Viz. "Ultimate Union – A Dangerous Bet"; 3. Viz. "Absolute Power"; 4. Viz. "The Miracle Beyond Hope"; 5. Viz. "Special Edition: Nebula Gray Epilogue"; 6. Viz. "The Legendary Berserker Sidestory"
MegaMan, ProtoMan, Colonel, TomahawkMan, GyroMan, and Bass are unable to defeat Nebula Gray. MegaMan pleas for Bass to Double-Soul with him to defeat Nebula Gray but is declined. When MegaMan receives a fatal injury protecting Bass, Bass fuses with him to save his life and forms BassCross MegaMan. Gaining the advantage, Nebula Gray absorbs CosmoMan and attempts to engulf MegaMan whom is saved by Bass. MegaMan uses his Double-Soul program to search for a beast to fuse with and wanders into a powerful beast, Double-Souling with it and deletes Nebula Gray. Bass then invades Regal's submarine and forces it to self destruct killing Regal in the process. As a result of his new transformation, dubbed as Beast-Out, MegaMan's data size increases forcing him to move into a new PET.
12	June 28, 2006	4-09-140170-8	July 3, 2007	1-42151-325-0
1. Viz. "Leading the Strong"; 2. Viz. "Survival Navi Battle!"; 3. Viz. "The Forbidden Power Returns!!"; 4. Viz. "Turmoil in the Underground"; 5. Viz. "Attack! CyberBeast Falzar!!"; Bonus Chapter Viz. "Nightmare of BattleChip Stadium"
A mysterious NetNavi named Iris beckons strong NetNavi to a prehistoric Cybernet where MegaMan found the beast. She reveals the Cybeast Gregar's seal was undone by MegaMan and the only way to reseal him is to gain the ultimate program given to the NetNavi who gather's the most Navi Marks. As the NetNavis battle each other to retrieve the loser's Navi Mark, MegaMan searches for Roll and rescues her. He is then confronted by CircusMan and is forced to Beast-Out to defeat him. The strain of the transformation puts MegaMan to sleep for three days. He returns to the prehistoric Cybernet and discovers Cybeast Falzar targeting him. ProtoMan, TomahawkMan, and SearchMan, defend him from Falzar's attack and give him their Navi Marks. Bass then appears and absorbs part of Falzar's power.
13	November 28, 2006	4-09-140246-1	February 05, 2008	1-42151-785-X
1. Viz. "The Symbol of Ultimate Power"; 2. Viz. "King of the Cyber Beasts, Born!!"; 3. Viz. "The Ultimate Super Beast Out!!"; 4. Viz. "Entrusted Hope"; 5. Viz. "Final Battle!! MegaMan vs ProtoMan"
Bass leaves in search of Gregar and Falzar to absorb their powers. Meanwhile, MegaMan runs into the last NetNavis participants remaining, Colonel and his two minions, JudgeMan and ElementMan. After defeating them, they surrender their Navi Marks and Iris awards MegaMan with the ultimate program, Super Beast-Out. Gregar and Falzar fuse into Cybeast Grezar which subsequently releases a large amount of energy causing the Cybernet to materialize in the real world. As Grezar turns reality into data and absorbs it, MegaMan and Bass confront Grezar. Eventually, MegaMan destroys Grezar's core and is seemingly deleted in the explosion. A year later, the Cybernet is re-opened and MegaMan reappears alive. Months pass and ProtoMan upgrades his Muramasa and challenges MegaMan to a battle resulting in a draw. Afterwards, Lan and Chaud promise to improve their Net-battling skills to match each other's levels in the future.
