= List of MegaMan NT Warrior episodes =

The Rockman EXE (ロックマンエグゼ, Rokkuman Eguze) television anime series, known in North America as MegaMan NT Warrior, is produced by Xebec. It is composed of five series and a feature film, Rockman EXE the Movie: Program of Light and Dark. The first series began airing on March 4, 2002, in Japan, with the fifth series concluding on September 30, 2006, totaling 209 episodes. The final series, Beast+, was marketed as a stand-alone series and its episodes were reduced to a twelve-minute run-time.

EXE and Axess were adapted in English by Viz Media and aired on Kids' WB in the United States, beginning May 17, 2003.

== Episode list ==
=== Season 1 ===
The first series was known in Japan as Rockman EXE (ロックマンエグゼ, Rokkuman Eguze). It is composed of two parts (called "Areas" in the DVD releases) for a total of 56 episodes. In the English version, only 52 were dubbed (most of which are very out-of-order), and only 48 aired in the United States. This series loosely covers the storylines of the first two Mega Man Battle Network video-games, and also features some characters and elements from the third game (most prominently the N1 Grand Prix tournament).

Series No.	Dub No.	Title	Directed by	Written by	Original release date	English release date
1	1	"Plug-in! Rockman!" / "Jack In! MegaMan!"; Transliteration: "Puragu-in! Rokkuman!" (Japanese: プラグイン！ロックマン！)	Masashi Abe	Kenichi Araki	March 4, 2002	May 17, 2003
2	2	"Subway Scramble!"; Transliteration: "Chikatetsu ōbōsō!" (Japanese: 地下鉄大暴走！)	Naoyoshi Kusaka	Kenichi Araki	March 11, 2002	May 24, 2003
3	3	"Signal Panic!" / "Traffic Signal Chaos!"; Transliteration: "Shigunaru panikku!" (Japanese: シグナルパニック！)	Wataru Sakaibashi	Masaharu Amiya	March 18, 2002	May 31, 2003
4	4	"Count to Three!"; Transliteration: "Mittsu kazoero!" (Japanese: 三つ数えろ！)	Takahiro Okada	Keiichi Hasegawa	March 25, 2002	June 7, 2003
5	5	"Challenge of the Rampaging Fish!" / "Robotic Fish Gone Wild!"; Transliteration: "Bōsō sakana no chōsen!" (Japanese: 暴走魚の挑戦！)	Yoshitaka Fujimoto	Mayori Sekijima	April 1, 2002	June 14, 2003
6	6	"Subzero Brawl!" / "Ice Ice Baby!"; Transliteration: "Reika no nettō!" (Japanese: 零下の熱闘！)	Naoyoshi Kusaka	Kenichi Araki	April 8, 2002	November 24, 2004
7	7	"Midnight Duel!" / "Game Off!"; Transliteration: "Mayonaka no kettō!" (Japanese: 真夜中の決闘！)	Takeshi Ushigusa	Keiichi Hasegawa	April 15, 2002	November 25, 2004
8	8	"Revenge Fireman!" / "Hot Tempers!"; Transliteration: "Ribenji Faiaman!" (Japanese: リベンジ ファイアマン！)	Masashi Abe	Masaharu Amiya	April 22, 2002	November 29, 2004
9	9	"Yoga Soldier of Terror!" / "The Yoga Warrior!"; Transliteration: "Kyōfu no yoga senshi!" (Japanese: 恐怖のヨガ戦士！)	Takahiro Okada	Mayori Sekijima	April 29, 2002	June 21, 2003
10	10	"N1 Grand Prix!"; Transliteration: "N1 guranpuri!" (Japanese: N1（エヌワン）グランプリ！)	Naoyoshi Kusaka	Kenichi Araki	May 6, 2002	June 28, 2003
11	11	"Invisible Enemy!" / "Skullmania!"; Transliteration: "Miezaru teki!" (Japanese: 見えざる敵！)	Yoshitaka Fujimoto	Keiichi Hasegawa	May 13, 2002	July 5, 2003
12	12	"Clash! Pink Spark!" / "Wacky Madness & Blazing Battles! (Part 1)"; Transliteration: "Gekitotsu! Pinku no hibana!" (Japanese: 激突！ ピンクの火花！)	Hiroshi Kimura	Mayori Sekijima	May 20, 2002	July 12, 2003
13	13	"Red Hot Net Battle!" / "Wacky Madness & Blazing Battles! (Part 2)"; Transliteration: "Shakunetsu no nettobatoru!" (Japanese: 灼熱のネットバトル！)	Atsushi Ōtsuki	Kenichi Araki	May 27, 2002	July 19, 2003
14	14	"Street Fight!"; Transliteration: "Sutorīto faito!" (Japanese: ストリートファイト！)	Naoyoshi Kusaka	Keiichi Hasegawa	June 3, 2002	July 26, 2003
15	15	"Intensive Training! Program Advance!" / "The Legendary Program Advance!"; Transliteration: "Tokkun! Puroguramu adobansu!" (Japanese: 特訓！ プログラムアドバンス！)	Daisuke Tsukushi	Kenichi Yamada	June 17, 2002	August 2, 2003
16	16	"Miraculous NetNavis!" / "The Solo NetNavis!"; Transliteration: "Kyōi no nettonabi!" (Japanese: 驚異のネットナビ！)	Yoshitaka Fujimoto	Kenichi Araki	June 24, 2002	August 9, 2003
17	17	"Commander Beef's True Identity!" / "Something's Fishy with Commander Beef!"; Transliteration: "Bīfu shirei no shōtai!" (Japanese: ビーフ司令の正体！)	Masashi Abe	Mayori Sekijima	July 1, 2002	August 16, 2003
18	18	"Secret Operation! World Three!" / "Evil Empress Roll! (Part 1)"; Transliteration: "An'yaku! Wārudosurī!" (Japanese: 暗躍！ ワールドスリー！)	Naoyoshi Kusaka	Kenichi Yamada	July 8, 2002	May 1, 2004
19	19	"Horror! Devil Chip!" / "Evil Empress Roll! (Part 2)"; Transliteration: "Senritsu! Akuma chippu!" (Japanese: 戦慄！ 悪魔チップ！)	Wataru Sakaibashi	Keiichi Hasegawa	July 15, 2002	May 3, 2004
20	20	"Yaito's Close Call!" / "There's No "I" in Team! (Part 1)"; Transliteration: "Yaito-chan kiki ippatsu!" (Japanese: やいとちゃん危機一髪！)	Atsushi Ōtsuki	Kenichi Araki	July 22, 2002	May 4, 2004
21	21	"Strongest Tag BR Whirlwind!" / "There's No "I" in Team! (Part 2)"; Transliteration: "Saikyō taggu BR senpū!" (Japanese: 最強タッグBR旋風！)	Daisuke Tsukushi	Kenichi Araki	July 29, 2002	May 4, 2004
22	22	"The Final Battle's End" / "That Sinking Feeling!"; Transliteration: "Fainaru batoru no hate ni" (Japanese: ファイナルバトルのはてに)	Naoyoshi Kusaka	Mayori Sekijima	August 5, 2002	May 5, 2004
23	23	"King of Destruction Pharaohman!" / "PharaohMan Reborn!"; Transliteration: "Hametsu no ō faraoman!" (Japanese: 破滅の王 ファラオマン！)	Yoshitaka Fujimoto	Keiichi Hasegawa	August 12, 2002	May 6, 2004
24	24	"Rockman Revival Strategy!" / "Rebuilding MegaMan!"; Transliteration: "Rokkuman fukkatsu sakusen!" (Japanese: ロックマン復活作戦！)	Hiroshi Kimura	Kenichi Yamada	August 19, 2002	May 7, 2004
25	25	"Revive! Rockman!" / "MegaMan Lives!"; Transliteration: "Yomigaere! Rokkuman!" (Japanese: 甦れ！ ロックマン！)	Masashi Abe	Kenichi Araki	August 26, 2002	May 8, 2004
26	-	"Bizarre! Mystery of the Ghost Ship!"; Transliteration: "Kaiki! Yūreisen no nazo!" (Japanese: 怪奇！ 幽霊船の謎！)	Naoyoshi Kusaka	Kenichi Yamada	September 2, 2002	Not aired in English
27	-	"To Become an Idol!"; Transliteration: "Aidoru ni narimasu!" (Japanese: アイドルになります！)	Daisuke Tsukushi	Naruhisa Arakawa	September 9, 2002	Not aired in English
28	26	"Rockman Stolen!" / "MegaMan Stolen!"; Transliteration: "Nusumareta Rokkuman!" (Japanese: 盗まれたロックマン！)	Naoyoshi Kusaka	Keiichi Hasegawa	September 16, 2002	October 15, 2004
29	27	"The Poison Snake Madam's Trap!" / "SnakeMan's Survival Seven"; Transliteration: "Dokuhebi Madamu no wana!" (Japanese: 毒ヘビマダムの罠！)	Yoshitaka Fujimoto	Naoko Marukawa	September 24, 2002	October 22, 2004
30	28	"Elec Mama's Blitzkrieg Strategy!" / "Don't Mess with Mama Zap!"; Transliteration: "Erekimama no dengeki sakusen!" (Japanese: エレキママの電撃作戦！)	Hiroshi Kimura	Kenichi Araki	September 30, 2002	November 30, 2004
31	29	"A Splendid Curry Battle!" / "The Great Curry NetBattle"; Transliteration: "Kareinaru karē batoru!" (Japanese: 華麗なるカレーバトル！)	Naoyoshi Kusaka	Mayori Sekijima	October 7, 2002	December 1, 2004
32	30	"Net City" / "NetCity!"; Transliteration: "Netto shiti" (Japanese: ネットシティ)	Masashi Abe	Takao Kato	October 14, 2002	May 15, 2004
33	31	"Crush the Virus Factory!" / "The Virus Factory"; Transliteration: "Uirusu kōjō o buttsubuse!" (Japanese: ウイルス工場をぶっ潰せ！)	Daisuke Tsukushi	Kenichi Araki	October 21, 2002	May 22, 2004
34	32	"Electronic Money Panic!"; Transliteration: "Denshi manē daikonran!" (Japanese: 電子マネー大混乱！)	Naoyoshi Kusaka	Kenichi Yamada	October 28, 2002	June 26, 2004
35	33	"0 Seconds Before the Dam Breaks!" / "Countdown to Catastrophe!"; Transliteration: "Damu kekkai 0 byōmae!" (Japanese: ダム決壊0秒前！)	Atsushi Ōtsuki	Keiichi Hasegawa	November 4, 2002	October 8, 2004
36	34	"Plan to Turn Densan City Antarctic!" / "DenTech City's Deep Freeze!"; Transliteration: "Densan shiti nankyokuka keikaku!" (Japanese: デンサンシティ南極化計画！)	Daisuke Tsukushi	Naoko Marukawa	November 11, 2002	June 5, 2004
37	35	"Crimson Flash!"; Transliteration: "Akai senkō!" (Japanese: 紅い閃光！)	Shin Katagai	Kenichi Araki	November 18, 2002	Aired only in Canada
38	36	"Strangely Strong! Cutman Brothers!" / "CutMan Brothers!"; Transliteration: "Hen ni tsuyoi zo! Kattoman burazāzu!" (Japanese: ヘンに強いぞ！カットマンブラザーズ！)	Naoyoshi Kusaka	Mayori Sekijima	November 25, 2002	Aired only in Canada
39	37	"Pretty Pretty Princess!" / "Guess Who's Coming to NetBattle!"; Transliteration: "Puripuri purinsesu!" (Japanese: ぷりぷりプリンセス！)	Daisuke Tsukushi	Kenichi Yamada	December 2, 2002	December 2, 2004
40	38	"I'll Battle You!" / "Chess Mess!"; Transliteration: "Batottarunen!" (Japanese: ばとったるねん！)	Naoyoshi Kusaka	Keiichi Hasegawa	December 9, 2002	December 7, 2004
41	39	"The Good Dog Rush!" / "The Incredible Rush!"; Transliteration: "Meiken rasshu!" (Japanese: 名犬ラッシュ！)	Atsushi Ōtsuki	Kenichi Yamada	December 16, 2002	December 8, 2004
42	40	"Changing Jobs to Gospel!" / "Working for Grave"; Transliteration: "Tenshoku saki wa gosuperu!" (Japanese: 転職先はゴスペル！)	Naoyoshi Kusaka	Mayori Sekijima	December 23, 2002	July 10, 2004
43	-	"Take Me Out to the Ball Game!"; Transliteration: "Boku o yakyū ni tsuretette!" (Japanese: 僕を野球に連れてって！)	Masashi Abe	Takao Kato	December 30, 2002	Not aired in English
44	41	"KnightMan's Betrayal!"; Transliteration: "Uragiri no Naitoman!" (Japanese: 裏切りのナイトマン！)	Atsushi Ōtsuki	Kenichi Yamada	January 6, 2003	July 3, 2004
45	42	"To the Moon!"; Transliteration: "Ano tsuki e ike!" (Japanese: あの月へ行け！)	Naoyoshi Kusaka	Naoko Marukawa	January 13, 2003	June 12, 2004
46	43	"Dr. Wily's Legacy!" / "Mr. Wily's Legacy!"; Transliteration: "Wairī-hakase no isan!" (Japanese: ワイリー博士の遺産！)	Daisuke Tsukushi	Kenichi Araki	January 20, 2003	July 17, 2004
47	44	"The NetMobile Grand Prix!"; Transliteration: "Netto mōbiru guranpuri!" (Japanese: ネットモービルグランプリ！)	Naoyoshi Kusaka	Mayori Sekijima	January 27, 2003	June 19, 2004
48	45	"The Cybernetic Monster!" / "The VirusBeast!"; Transliteration: "Dennō no mamono!" (Japanese: 電脳の魔物！)	Hiroshi Kimura	Kenichi Yamada	February 3, 2003	July 24, 2004
49	46	"Gospel" / "Grave"; Transliteration: "Gosuperu" (Japanese: ゴスペル)	Atsushi Ōtsuki	Kenichi Araki	February 10, 2003	July 31, 2004
50	47	"Forte" / "Bass"; Transliteration: "Forute" (Japanese: フォルテ)	Naoyoshi Kusaka	Kenichi Araki	February 17, 2003	August 7, 2004
51	48	"Moment of Break-Down!" / "The End of the End!"; Transliteration: "Hōkai no toki!" (Japanese: 崩壊の刻)	Masashi Abe	Kenichi Araki	February 24, 2003	August 14, 2004
52	-	"Secret of the Ayanokōji House!"; Transliteration: "Ayanokōjike no himitsu!" (Japanese: 綾小路家の秘密！)	Naoyoshi Kusaka	Kenichi Yamada	March 3, 2003	Not aired in English
53	49	"Commander Beef VS Netto!" / "NetBattle of the Hearts!"; Transliteration: "Bīfu shirei VS Netto-kun!" (Japanese: ビーフ司令VS熱斗くん！)	Daisuke Tsukushi	Keiichi Hasegawa	March 10, 2003	Aired only in Canada
54	50	"Chisao's in Town!"; Transliteration: "Chisao ga machi ni yattekita!" (Japanese: チサオが町にやってきた！)	Naoyoshi Kusaka	Mayori Sekijima	March 17, 2003	November 23, 2004
55	51	"Blues's Long Day" / "From Here to Revolutionary PETs"; Transliteration: "Burūsu no nagai ichinichi" (Japanese: ブルースの長い一日)	Shin Katagai	Naoko Marukawa	March 24, 2003	December 9, 2004
56	52	"Virus Busters!"; Transliteration: "Uirusu basutāzu!" (Japanese: ウィルスバスターズ！)	Masashi Abe	Kenichi Araki	March 31, 2003	August 21, 2004

=== Season 2: Axess ===
Series No.	Dub No.	Title	Directed by	Written by	Original release date	English release date
1	1	"Cross Fusion!"; Transliteration: "Kurosu fyūjon!" (Japanese: クロスフュージョン！)	Tsuyoshi Nagasawa	Kenichi Araki	October 4, 2003	November 22, 2004
2	2	"NetCity No More!"; Transliteration: "Netto Shiti shōmetsu!" (Japanese: ネットシティ消滅！)	Naoyoshi Kusaka	Kenichi Araki	October 11, 2003	March 1, 2005
3	3	"Flowing Dangerous Foam!" / "Bubble Trouble!"; Transliteration: "Jabajaba yabai mizu no awa!" (Japanese: ジャバジャバやばい水の泡！)	Son Seung-hee	Katsuhiko Chiba	October 18, 2003	March 2, 2005
4	4	"Soul Unison!" / "DoubleSoul!"; Transliteration: "Souru unizon!" (Japanese: ソウルユニゾン！)	Naoyoshi Kusaka	Kenichi Yamada	October 25, 2003	March 3, 2005
5	5	"Metal Hot Spring! Ow It's Hot!"; Transliteration: "Metaru onsen acchicchi!" (Japanese: メタル温泉アッチッチ！)	Fumihiro Ueno	Kenichi Yamada	November 1, 2003	March 4, 2005
6	6	"The Most Dangerous Ball Game!" / "A Dangerous Bowling Game!"; Transliteration: "Mottomo kiken na kyūgi!" (Japanese: 最も危険な球技！)	Naoyoshi Kusaka	Masaharu Amiya	November 8, 2003	March 7, 2005
7	7	"Electronic Flower Garden!" / "The CyberGarden of Doom!"; Transliteration: "Denshi no hanazono!" (Japanese: 電子の花園！)	Tsuyoshi Nagasawa	Naoko Marukawa	November 15, 2003	March 8, 2005
8	8	"Friendship in the Mirror"; Transliteration: "Kagami no naka no yūjō" (Japanese: 鏡のなかの友情)	Harume Kosaka	Mayori Sekijima	November 22, 2003	March 9, 2005
9	9	"Dekao Returns" / "Dex Returns!"; Transliteration: "Kaettekita Dekao" (Japanese: 帰ってきたデカオ)	Son Seung-hee	Kenichi Araki	November 29, 2003	March 10, 2005
10	10	"Threat of the DarkChips!"; Transliteration: "Dāku chippu no kyōi!" (Japanese: ダークチップの脅威)	Naoyoshi Kusaka	Masashi Kubota	December 6, 2003	March 14, 2005
11	11	"Beat the Safecracker!" / "The Unsafe Safe!"; Transliteration: "Kinkoyaburi o yattsukero!" (Japanese: 金庫破りをやっつけろ！)	Atsushi Ōtsuki	Katsuhiko Chiba	December 13, 2003	March 15, 2005
12	12	"The Steel Sniper" / "Code of Conduct"; Transliteration: "Kōtetsu no sunaipā" (Japanese: 鋼鉄のスナイパー)	Tsuyoshi Nagasawa	Masaharu Amiya	December 20, 2003	April 11, 2005
13	13	"Cross Fusion Disappearance!" / "CrossFusion for All!"; Transliteration: "Kurosufyūjon shōmetsu!" (Japanese: クロスフュージョン消滅！)	Son Seung-hee	Kenichi Yamada	December 27, 2003	April 18, 2005
14	14	"The Purloined Princess"; Transliteration: "Nusumareta purinsesu" (Japanese: 盗まれたプリンセス)	Harume Kosaka	Masashi Kubota	January 4, 2004	March 17, 2005
15	15	"The Incredible Guts!"; Transliteration: "Chōjin Gattsu!" (Japanese: 超人ガッツ！)	Naoyoshi Kusaka	Kenichi Araki	January 17, 2004	April 25, 2005
16	16	"Cute! Demon?" / "It's All How You Look at It!"; Transliteration: "Kawaii! Akuma?" (Japanese: カワイイ！悪魔？)	Son Seung-hee	Mayori Sekijima	January 24, 2004	June 6, 2005
17	17	"The Assaulting Beastman!" / "SavageMan Returns!"; Transliteration: "Kyōshū Bīsutoman!" (Japanese: 強襲ビーストマン！)	Tsuyoshi Nagasawa	Kenichi Yamada	January 31, 2004	May 2, 2005
18	18	"The Man from Sharo"; Transliteration: "Shāro kara kita otoko" (Japanese: シャーロから来た男)	Son Seung-hee	Masaharu Amiya	February 7, 2004	May 9, 2005
19	19	"SearchSoul!"; Transliteration: "Sāchi souru!" (Japanese: サーチソウル！)	Naoyoshi Kusaka	Kenichi Yamada	February 14, 2004	May 16, 2005
20	20	"Hand Over the Dark Chip!" / "Dark Secret"; Transliteration: "Dāku chippu o yokose!" (Japanese: ダークチップをよこせ！)	Son Seung-hee	Kenichi Araki	February 21, 2004	May 23, 2005
21	21	"ShadeMan's Ambition"; Transliteration: "Shēdoman no yabō" (Japanese: シェードマンの野望)	Harume Kosaka	Masashi Kubota	February 28, 2004	May 30, 2005
22	22	"Bubbleman's Great Friend Strategy" / "BubbleMan's Plan"; Transliteration: "Baburuman no tomodachi daisakusen" (Japanese: バブルマンの友達大作戦)	Shigeru Ueda	Katsuhiko Chiba	March 6, 2004	September 10, 2005
23	23	"Super Energy of Terror" / "The Super Power of Shiver"; Transliteration: "Senritsu no chō enerugī" (Japanese: 戦慄の超エネルギー)	Naoyoshi Kusaka	Mayori Sekijima	March 13, 2004	June 13, 2005
24	24	"Red Hot Magma Fight" / "Magma Battle"; Transliteration: "Shakunetsu maguma no tatakai" (Japanese: 灼熱マグマの戦い)	Tsuyoshi Nagasawa	Katsuhiko Chiba	March 20, 2004	June 18, 2005
25	25	"VideoMan Returns!"; Transliteration: "Bideoman, ritānzu!" (Japanese: ビデオマン、リターンズ！)	Yukio Suzuki	Masaharu Amiya	March 27, 2004	June 25, 2005
26	26	"Memory of the Blue Flame" / "Anetta's Revenge"; Transliteration: "Aoki honoo no kioku" (Japanese: 青き炎の記憶)	Naoyoshi Kusaka	Masashi Kubota	April 3, 2004	July 2, 2005
27	27	"Decisive Battle! Nebula Base" / "Nebula's Secret Base"; Transliteration: "Kessen! Nebyura kichi" (Japanese: 決戦！ネビュラ基地)	Naoyoshi Kusaka	Kenichi Araki	April 10, 2004	July 9, 2005
28	28	"Wavering Heart"; Transliteration: "Yureru kokoro" (Japanese: 揺れる心)	Harume Kosaka	Kenichi Yamada	April 17, 2004	July 16, 2005
29	29	"Enzan VS Blues" / "Chaud VS ProtoMan"; Transliteration: "Enzan VS Burūsu" (Japanese: 炎山VSブルース)	Son Seung-hee	Naoko Marukawa	April 24, 2004	July 23, 2005
30	30	"Lovey-Dovey Aquaman" / "SpoutMan's New Hero!"; Transliteration: "Raburabu Akuaman" (Japanese: ラブラブアクアマン)	Naoyoshi Kusaka	Katsuhiko Chiba	May 1, 2004	Aired only in Canada (Later bundled in 2023)
31	31	"Object Junkman from the Satellite" / "Space Junk!"; Transliteration: "Eisei kara no buttai Jankuman" (Japanese: 衛星からの物体J（ｼﾞｬﾝｸﾏﾝ）)	Naoyoshi Kusaka	Masaharu Amiya	May 8, 2004	July 30, 2005
32	32	"Revival! Commander Beef" / "Commander Beef Returns!"; Transliteration: "Fukkatsu! Bīfu shirei" (Japanese: 復活！ビーフ司令)	Osamu Inoue	Mayori Sekijima	May 15, 2004	September 3, 2005
33	33	"Cross Fusion #0" / "The BattleChip Gate"; Transliteration: "Kurosu fyūjon Zero-gō" (Japanese: クロスフュージョン0号)	Son Seung-hee	Kenichi Araki	May 22, 2004	August 6, 2005
34	34	"Wanted: PrismMan"; Transliteration: "Shimeitehai wa Purizuman" (Japanese: 指名手配はプリズマン)	Tsuyoshi Nagasawa	Kenichi Araki	May 29, 2004	August 13, 2005
35	35	"Nebula's Great Invasion!"; Transliteration: "Nebyura daishinkō!" (Japanese: ネビュラ大侵攻！)	Naoyoshi Kusaka	Kenichi Yamada	June 5, 2004	August 20, 2005
36	36	"Completion! New Style PET!" / "The New PET"; Transliteration: "Kansei! Shingata PET!" (Japanese: 完成！ 新型PET！)	Atsushi Ōtsuki	Masashi Kubota	June 12, 2004	August 27, 2005
37	37	"Mysterious Masked Navi"; Transliteration: "Nazo no fukumen Nabi" (Japanese: 謎の覆面ナビ)	Shigeru Ueda	Katsuhiko Chiba	June 19, 2004	November 28, 2005
38	-	"Flying to Shiisaa Island"; Transliteration: "Tonde Shīsā Airando" (Japanese: 飛んでシーサーアイランド)	Osamu Inoue	Naoko Marukawa	June 26, 2004	Not aired in English
39	-	"Go to Hell by Train?!"; Transliteration: "Ressha de GO to hell!?" (Japanese: 列車でGO to hell！？)	Naoyoshi Kusaka	Masaharu Amiya	July 3, 2004	Not aired in English
40	38	"Hero of the Earth's Bowels" / "Underground Hero"; Transliteration: "Chi no soko no eiyū" (Japanese: 地の底の英雄)	Daisuke Tsukushi	Mayori Sekijima	July 10, 2004	November 29, 2005
41	39	"Allegro"; Transliteration: "Areguro" (Japanese: アレグロ)	Son Seung-hee	Kenichi Araki	July 17, 2004	November 30, 2005
42	-	"Maylu's First Date"; Transliteration: "Meiru no hatsu dēto" (Japanese: メイルの初デート)	Naoyoshi Kusaka	Masashi Kubota	July 24, 2004	Not aired in English
43	-	"Top and Grandchild"; Transliteration: "Koma to Mago" (Japanese: コマとマゴ)	Yukio Suzuki	Masaharu Amiya	July 31, 2004	Not aired in English
44	40	"Fear of Summer Vacation" / "MistMan's Tower"; Transliteration: "Natsuyasumi no kyōfu" (Japanese: 夏休みの恐怖)	Tsuyoshi Nagasawa	Katsuhiko Chiba	August 7, 2004	December 1, 2005
45	-	"Rush Runs Away"; Transliteration: "Rasshu no iede" (Japanese: ラッシュの家出)	Naoyoshi Kusaka	Kenichi Yamada	August 14, 2004	Not aired in English
46	41	"The Great NetPolice Battle!"; Transliteration: "Netto keisatsu daikōbōsen!" (Japanese: ネット警察大攻防戦！)	Daisuke Tsukushi	Masashi Kubota	August 21, 2004	December 2, 2005
47	42	"A Message from Outer Space" / "Get Dr. Regal!"; Transliteration: "Uchiu kara no messēji" (Japanese: 宇宙からのメッセージ)	Shigeru Ueda; Son Seung-hee	Masaharu Amiya	August 28, 2004	December 5, 2005
48	43	"Mariko and Yuriko" / "Ms. Yuri's Mission"; Transliteration: "Mariko to Yuriko" (Japanese: まりことゆりこ)	Shin Katagai	Kenichi Araki	September 4, 2004	December 6, 2005
49	44	"Farewell Blues" / "ProtoMan Returns"; Transliteration: "Saraba Burūsu" (Japanese: さらば ブルース)	Osamu Inoue	Mayori Sekijima	September 11, 2004	December 7, 2005
50	45	"Dark VS Dark"; Transliteration: "Dāku tai dāku no kessen" (Japanese: ダーク対ダークの決戦)	Naoyoshi Kusaka	Katsuhiko Chiba	September 18, 2004	December 8, 2005
51	46	"Where the Light Reaches" / "Dr. Regal's Rampage"; Transliteration: "Hikari todoku basho" (Japanese: 光とどく場所)	Tsuyoshi Nagasawa	Kenichi Araki	September 25, 2004	December 9, 2005

=== Season 3: Stream ===
No.	Title	Directed by	Written by	Original release date
1	"Duo"; Transliteration: "Dyūo" (Japanese: デューオ)	Shin Katagai	Kenichi Araki	October 2, 2004
2	"Earth Erasure"; Transliteration: "Chikyū massatsu" (Japanese: 地球抹殺)	Daisuke Tsukushi	Kenichi Araki	October 9, 2004
3	"Threat of the Asteroid"; Transliteration: "Asuteroido no kyōi" (Japanese: アステロイドの脅威)	Naoyoshi Kusaka	Mayori Sekijima	October 16, 2004
4	"Salad Memorial Day?!"; Transliteration: "Sarada kinenbi!?" (Japanese: サラダ記念日！？)	Son Seung-hee	Masaharu Amiya	October 23, 2004
5	"Flying Pick-Up Artist!"; Transliteration: "Soratobu nanpa yarō!" (Japanese: 空飛ぶナンパ野郎！)	Osamu Inoue	Kenichi Yamada	October 30, 2004
6	"Stone Panic!"; Transliteration: "Sutōn panikku!" (Japanese: ストーンパニック！)	Naoyoshi Kusaka	Masashi Kubota	November 6, 2004
7	"Navi Car Race!"; Transliteration: "Nabi kā rēsu!" (Japanese: ナビカーレース！)	Atsushi Ōtsuki	Katsuhiko Chiba	November 13, 2004
8	"Calling on Colonel!"; Transliteration: "Kāneru sanjō!" (Japanese: カーネル参上！)	Shin Katagai	Kenichi Araki	November 20, 2004
9	"Revival! Neo WWW"; Transliteration: "Fukkatsu! Neo wārudo surī" (Japanese: 復活！ ネオWWW)	Naoyoshi Kusaka	Mayori Sekijima	November 27, 2004
10	"Rhapsody in Pink"; Transliteration: "Rapusodi in pinku" (Japanese: ラプソディ イン ピンク)	Daisuke Tsukushi	Naoko Marukawa	December 4, 2004
11	"Concrete Jungle"; Transliteration: "Konkurīto janguru" (Japanese: コンクリートジャングル)	Naoyoshi Kusaka	Masaharu Amiya	December 11, 2004
12	"Jawaii Curry and Tomahawk"; Transliteration: "Jawai karē to Tomahōku" (Japanese: ジャワイカレーとトマホーク)	Osamu Inoue	Kenichi Yamada	December 18, 2004
13	"Jasmine"; Transliteration: "Jasumin" (Japanese: ジャスミン)	Tsuyoshi Nagasawa	Masashi Kubota	December 25, 2004
14	"Bubble GoGoGo!"; Transliteration: "Baburu GoGoGo!" (Japanese: バブルGoGoGo！)	Naoyoshi Kusaka	Katsuhiko Chiba	January 8, 2005
15	"Icy Invention... you say?!" Transliteration: "Kōri no hatsumei... de kofu!?" (Japanese: 氷の発明･･･でコフ！？)	Yasunori Urata	Masaharu Amiya	January 15, 2005
16	"Gravity Diet of Terror!"; Transliteration: "Kyōfu no gurabiti daietto!" (Japanese: 恐怖の重力ダイエット！)	Naoyoshi Kusaka	Mayori Sekijima	January 22, 2005
17	"Dark Chip Again"; Transliteration: "Dāku chippu futatabi" (Japanese: ダークチップ再び)	Daisuke Tsukushi	Kenichi Yamada	January 29, 2005
18	"Sword and Samurai"; Transliteration: "Tsurugi to samurai" (Japanese: 剣とサムライ)	Naoyoshi Kusaka	Naoko Marukawa	February 5, 2005
19	"The Explosion that Carries Happiness"; Transliteration: "Shiawase o hakobu bakuhatsu" (Japanese: 幸せを運ぶ爆発)	Naoyoshi Kusaka	Masashi Kubota	February 12, 2005
20	"Stormy Vacation"; Transliteration: "Arashi no bakansu" (Japanese: 嵐のバカンス)	Osamu Inoue	Katsuhiko Chiba	February 19, 2005
21	"Dr. Wily's Daughter"; Transliteration: "Dokutā Wairī no musume" (Japanese: ドクターワイリーの娘)	Yasunori Urata	Kenichi Araki	February 26, 2005
22	"Dekao, Curry Transformation"; Transliteration: "Dekao, karē naru henshin" (Japanese: デカオ、カレーなる転身)	Naoyoshi Kusaka	Masaharu Amiya	March 5, 2005
23	"Ni Hao! Net Hermit"; Transliteration: "Nīhao! Netto sennin" (Japanese: ニーハオ！ネット仙人)	Tsuyoshi Nagasawa	Mayori Sekijima	March 12, 2005
24	"Narcy's Retirement"; Transliteration: "Narushī dattai" (Japanese: ナルシー脱退)	Naoyoshi Kusaka	Masashi Kubota	March 19, 2005
25	"Terrible Birthday Present"; Transliteration: "Senritsu no bāsudē purezento" (Japanese: 戦慄のバースディプレゼント)	Naoyoshi Kusaka	Mayori Sekijima	March 26, 2005
26	"Icy Asteroid Castle"; Transliteration: "Koori no asuteroido-jō" (Japanese: 氷のアステロイド城)	Yasunori Urata	Kenichi Araki	April 2, 2005
27	"Route's Close Call!"; Transliteration: "Rūto-san Kiki ippatsu!" (Japanese: ルートさん危機一髪！)	Naoyoshi Kusaka	Masaharu Amiya	April 9, 2005
28	"Pink Punch Maylu"; Transliteration: "Pinku panchi Meiru" (Japanese: ピンクパンチメイル)	Naoyoshi Kusaka	Katsuhiko Chiba	April 16, 2005
29	"The Safecracking Man"; Transliteration: "Kinkoyaburi no otoko" (Japanese: 金庫破りの男)	Osamu Inoue	Naoko Marukawa	April 23, 2005
30	"Tesla - A Complicated Girl's Mind"; Transliteration: "Tesla fukuzatsu na otomegokoro" (Japanese: テスラ・複雑な乙女心)	Naoyoshi Kusaka	Masashi Kubota	April 30, 2005
31	"Shademan's Counterattack"; Transliteration: "Shēdoman Gyakushū" (Japanese: シェードマン逆襲)	Tsuyoshi Nagasawa	Kenichi Araki	May 7, 2005
32	"Space-Time Battle"; Transliteration: "Jikū sensō" (Japanese: 時空戦争)	Naoyoshi Kusaka	Kenichi Araki	May 14, 2005
33	"Oath of the Tomahawk"; Transliteration: "Tomahōku no chikai" (Japanese: トマホークの誓い)	Naoyoshi Kusaka	Kenichi Yamada	May 21, 2005
34	"Wish Upon a Star..."; Transliteration: "Hoshi ni negai o..." (Japanese: 星に願いを…)	Yasunori Urata	Masaharu Amiya	May 28, 2005
35	"Queen Fight!"; Transliteration: "Kuīn faito!" (Japanese: クィーンファイト！)	Naoyoshi Kusaka	Katsuhiko Chiba	June 4, 2005
36	"Another Rockman"; Transliteration: "Mō hitori no Rokkuman" (Japanese: もう一人のロックマン)	Naoyoshi Kusaka	Mayori Sekijima	June 11, 2005
37	"Fireworks for Deko"; Transliteration: "Deko ni sasageru hanabi" (Japanese: デコにささげる花火)	Osamu Inoue	Mayori Sekijima	June 18, 2005
38	"Love Meteorology"; Transliteration: "Koi no ryūsei uranai" (Japanese: 恋の流星占い)	Naoyoshi Kusaka	Katsuhiko Chiba	June 25, 2005
39	"Cross Fusion Impossible?"; Transliteration: "Kurosu fyūjon funō?" (Japanese: クロスフュージョン不能？)	Tsuyoshi Nagasawa	Masaharu Amiya	July 2, 2005
40	"Neo WWW Annihilation"; Transliteration: "Neo wārudo surī kaimetsu" (Japanese: ネオWWW壊滅)	Yasunori Urata	Masashi Kubota	July 9, 2005
41	"Top Secret Orders C.F."; Transliteration: "Gokuhi shirei C.F." (Japanese: 極秘指令C.F.)	Naoyoshi Kusaka	Kenichi Araki	July 16, 2005
42	"Below Duo's Comet"; Transliteration: "Dyūo no hoshi no moto ni" (Japanese: デューオの彗星の下に)	Naoyoshi Kusaka	Kenichi Araki	July 23, 2005
43	"Worker Miyabi"; Transliteration: "Shigotonin Miyabi" (Japanese: 仕事人ミヤビ)	Tsuyoshi Nagasawa	Mayori Sekijima	July 30, 2005
44	"Summer! The Sea! Training Camp!"; Transliteration: "Natsu da! Umi da! Gasshuku da!" (Japanese: 夏だ！ 海だ！ 合宿だ！)	Naoyoshi Kusaka	Kenichi Yamada	August 6, 2005
45	"Stellar Memory"; Transliteration: "Hoshi no kioku" (Japanese: 星の記憶)	Yasunori Urata	Takao Kato	August 13, 2005
46	"Pursued Crest"; Transliteration: "Nerawareta monshō" (Japanese: ねらわれた紋章)	Naoyoshi Kusaka	Naoko Marukawa	August 20, 2005
47	"Why Are You Here?"; Transliteration: "Nande omae ga koko ni iru" (Japanese: なんでおまえがここにいる)	Naoyoshi Kusaka	Katsuhiko Chiba	August 27, 2005
48	"Countdown to Extinction"; Transliteration: "Shōmetsu e no kauntodaun" (Japanese: 消滅へのカウントダウン)	Yasunori Urata	Masashi Kubota	September 3, 2005
49	"The War of the Unbonded"; Transliteration: "Kizuna naki mono no tatakai" (Japanese: きずななき者の戦い)	Naoyoshi Kusaka	Mayori Sekijima	September 10, 2005
50	"Colonel Barrel"; Transliteration: "Bareru taisa" (Japanese: バレル大佐)	Naoyoshi Kusaka	Kenichi Araki	September 17, 2005
51	"Toward a New Future"; Transliteration: "Arata naru mirai e" (Japanese: 新たなる未来へ)	Tsuyoshi Nagasawa	Kenichi Araki	September 24, 2005

=== Season 4: Beast ===
No.	Title	Directed by	Written by	Original release date
1	"Beyondard"; Transliteration: "Biyondādo" (Japanese: ビヨンダード)	Yasunori Urata	Kenichi Araki	October 1, 2005
2	"Zoanoroid"; Transliteration: "Zoanoroido" (Japanese: ゾアノロイド)	Kimiharu Mutō	Katsuhiko Chiba	October 8, 2005
3	"Copyroid"; Transliteration: "Kopīroido" (Japanese: コピーロイド)	Yukio Kuroda	Masashi Kubota	October 15, 2005
4	"The Foghorn that Calls the Phantom"; Transliteration: "Onibi o yobu muteki" (Japanese: 鬼火を呼ぶ霧笛)	Shigeru Ueda	Mayori Sekijima	October 22, 2005
5	"Rampaging Display"; Transliteration: "Bōsō disupurei" (Japanese: 暴走ディスプレイ)	Kimiharu Mutō	Naoko Marukawa	October 29, 2005
6	"Net Navi Remodeling Scheme"; Transliteration: "Nettonabi kaizō keigaku" (Japanese: ネットナビ改造計画)	Tsuyoshi Nagasawa	Kenichi Araki	November 5, 2005
7	"Capture Rockman!"; Transliteration: "Rokkuman o hokaku seyo!" (Japanese: ロックマンを捕獲せよ！)	Yukio Kuroda	Mayori Sekijima	November 12, 2005
8	"Green-Eyed Transfer Student"; Transliteration: "Midori no hitomi no yenkōsei" (Japanese: みどりの瞳の転校生)	Kimiharu Mutō	Katsuhiko Chiba	November 19, 2005
9	"Icy Heart"; Transliteration: "Koori no kokoro" (Japanese: 氷の心)	Daisuke Tsukushi	Kenichi Yamada	November 26, 2005
10	"Aiming for Trill"; Transliteration: "Nerawareta Toriru" (Japanese: 狙われたトリル)	Yukio Kuroda	Masashi Kubota	December 3, 2005
11	"Ocean Bottom SOS"; Transliteration: "Kaitei SOS" (Japanese: 海底SOS)	Yasunori Urata	Katsuhiko Chiba	December 10, 2005
12	"Trill's Secret"; Transliteration: "Toriru no himitsu" (Japanese: トリルの秘密)	Kimiharu Mutō	Mayori Sekijima	December 17, 2005
13	"Synchronizer"; Transliteration: "Shinkuronaizā" (Japanese: シンクロナイザー)	Yukio Kuroda	Kenichi Araki	December 24, 2005
14	"Beyondard 2"; Transliteration: "Biyondādo 2" (Japanese: ビヨンダード2)	Tsuyoshi Nagasawa	Kenichi Araki	January 7, 2006
15	"The Railroad Kingdom"; Transliteration: "Tetsuro no ōkoku" (Japanese: 鉄路の王国)	Kimiharu Mutō	Naoko Marukawa	January 14, 2006
16	"Cooking is Love!"; Transliteration: "Ryōri wa aijō!" (Japanese: 料理は愛情！)	Shigeru Ueda	Mayori Sekijima	January 21, 2006
17	"Sage Feng Tian"; Transliteration: "Fūten rōshi" (Japanese: 風天老師)	Yukio Kuroda	Masashi Kubota	January 28, 2006
18	"Rocks of Steel"; Transliteration: "Kōtetsu no iwa" (Japanese: 鋼鉄の岩)	Kimiharu Mutō	Kenichi Yamada	February 4, 2006
19	"The Secret of the Lake"; Transliteration: "Mizuumi no himitsu de a~ru" (Japanese: 湖の秘密であ～る)	Yasunori Urata	Katsuhiko Chiba	February 11, 2006
20	"Dimensional Area Laboratory"; Transliteration: "Dimenshonaru eria kenkyūjo" (Japanese: ディメンショナルエリア研究所)	Yukio Kuroda	Kenichi Araki	February 25, 2006
21	"Falzer Invasion!"; Transliteration: "Faruzā shūrai!" (Japanese: ファルザー襲来！)	Kimiharu Mutō	Katsuhiko Chiba	March 4, 2006
22	"The Boy Called Death"; Transliteration: "Shinigami to yobareta shōnen" (Japanese: 死神と呼ばれた少年)	Tsuyoshi Nagasawa	Mayori Sekijima	March 11, 2006
23	"Colonel's Rampage"; Transliteration: "Kāneru bōsō" (Japanese: カーネル暴走)	Yukio Kuroda	Masashi Kubota	March 18, 2006
24	"Wily's Laboratory"; Transliteration: "Wairī kenkyūjo" (Japanese: ワイリー研究所)	Kimiharu Mutō	Kenichi Araki	March 25, 2006
25	"Exceeding Light"; Transliteration: "Hikari o koete" (Japanese: 光を超えて)	Yasunori Urata	Kenichi Araki	April 1, 2006

=== Season 5: Beast+ ===
No.	Title	Directed by	Written by	Original release date
1	"The Name is Zero"; Transliteration: "Sono na wa Zero" (Japanese: その名はゼロ)	Shigeru Ueda	Kenichi Araki	April 8, 2006
2	"Zero Virus"; Transliteration: "Zero uirusu" (Japanese: ゼロウイルス)	Tsuyoshi Nagasawa	Kenichi Araki	April 15, 2006
3	"Zero Invasion"; Transliteration: "Zero shinnyū" (Japanese: ゼロ侵入)	Kimiharu Mutō	Katsuhiko Chiba	April 22, 2006
4	"Sushi Factory Trap"; Transliteration: "Osushi kōjō no wana" (Japanese: お寿司工場の罠)	Kimiharu Mutō	Katsuhiko Chiba	April 29, 2006
5	"Zero's True Character"; Transliteration: "Zero no shōtai" (Japanese: ゼロの正体)	Yasunori Urata	Masashi Kubota	May 6, 2006
6	"Super Cyber Beast Again!"; Transliteration: "Chō dennōjū futatabi!" (Japanese: 超電脳獣 再び！)	Yasunori Urata	Masashi Kubota	May 13, 2006
7	"The Demon Deko"; Transliteration: "Dēmon Deko nano de a~ru" (Japanese: デーモン・デコなのであ～る)	Kimiharu Mutō	Mayori Sekijima	May 20, 2006
8	"Big Things are Good Things!"; Transliteration: "Ōkii koto wa ii koto da puku!" (Japanese: 大きいことはいいことだプク！)	Kimiharu Mutō	Mayori Sekijima	May 27, 2006
9	"Wishing Upon an Empty Can"; Transliteration: "Akikan no negai o" (Japanese: 空き缶に願いを)	Kimiharu Mutō	Kenichi Araki	June 3, 2006
10	"Cross Fusion"; Transliteration: "Kurosu fyūjon de a~ru" (Japanese: クロスフュージョンであ～る)	Kimiharu Mutō	Kenichi Araki	June 10, 2006
11	"The Electel Estate Situation"; Transliteration: "Erekiteru-ke no jijō" (Japanese: エレキテル家の事情)	Yasunori Urata	Naoko Marukawa	June 17, 2006
12	"Electric-Shock Exploration Party!"; Transliteration: "Dengeki tankentai!" (Japanese: 電撃探険隊！)	Yasunori Urata	Naoko Marukawa	June 24, 2006
13	"Here Come the Hole Diggers!"; Transliteration: "Anahori yarō ga yattekita!" (Japanese: 穴掘り野郎がやってきた！)	Kimiharu Mutō	Kenichi Yamada	July 1, 2006
14	"Rampaging Mettool"; Transliteration: "Bōsō Mettōru" (Japanese: 暴走メットール)	Kimiharu Mutō	Kenichi Yamada	July 8, 2006
15	"Mini Mini Typhoon"; Transliteration: "Mini mini taifūn" (Japanese: ミニミニタイフーン)	Yasunori Urata	Katsuhiko Chiba	July 15, 2006
16	"The Keeper of the Law"; Transliteration: "Hō no bannin" (Japanese: 法の番人)	Atsushi Ōtsuki	Masashi Kubota	July 22, 2006
17	"Virus with a Heart"; Transliteration: "Kokoro aru uirusu" (Japanese: 心あるウイルス)	Kimiharu Mutō	Mayori Sekijima	July 29, 2006
18	"Zero's Spirit"; Transliteration: "Zero no tamashii" (Japanese: ゼロの魂)	Kimiharu Mutō	Mayori Sekijima	August 5, 2006
19	"I Want Limited Goods"; Transliteration: "Genteihin hoshii puku" (Japanese: 限定品ほしいプク)	Atsushi Ōtsuki	Yukari Matsumura	August 12, 2006
20	"Iceman the Strongest"; Transliteration: "Saikyō Aisuman" (Japanese: 最強アイスマン)	Yasunori Urata	Katsuhiko Chiba	August 19, 2006
21	"Magician from the Darkness"; Transliteration: "Yami kara no majishan" (Japanese: 闇からのマジシャン)	Kimiharu Mutō	Masashi Kubota	August 26, 2006
22	"Substantiating Phantoms"; Transliteration: "Jittaika suru yūrei" (Japanese: 実体化する幽霊)	Kimiharu Mutō	Mayori Sekijima	September 2, 2006
23	"Jammingman"; Transliteration: "Jaminguman" (Japanese: ジャミングマン)	Kimiharu Mutō	Kenichi Araki	September 9, 2006
24	"Cache"; Transliteration: "Kyasshu" (Japanese: キャッシュ)	Kimiharu Mutō	Kenichi Araki	September 16, 2006
25	"Searching for Tomorrow"; Transliteration: "Ashita o sagashite" (Japanese: 明日をさがして)	Yasunori Urata	Takao Kato	September 23, 2006
26	"Netto + Rockman"; Transliteration: "Netto + Rokkuman" (Japanese: 熱斗+ロックマン)	Atsushi Ōtsuki	Takao Kato	September 30, 2006

== DVD releases ==
The episode releases in Japan are vastly different from the English ones in both aesthetics and content. In Japan, volumes typically contain three episodes (with the exceptions usually being the first volume in a series to contain two and the last volume to contain four). The Japanese volumes are also released in two not-for-sale "rental" formats, DVD and a VHS, but with identical contents. These versions have slightly different box designs. The DVDs were typically released once a month, but sometimes there were simultaneous releases near the end of a series.

For English releases, each DVD contains four episodes each (originally, the fourth episode was included as a special "bonus" episode with a separate menu from the other three episodes on the DVD). The first six volumes were also released in VHS format; however, they only contained three episodes each (skipping the fourth episode that appeared on the DVDs). Presumably, the VHS versions stopped releasing due to poor sales. The DVDs were originally released somewhat sporadically, but since Volume 5, a new volume had been released every January, April, July, and October in a tri-monthly pattern.

The Japanese DVDs typically contain the episodes themselves with occasional bonus material (such as clean intro sequences or special trailers), as well as (in some cases) promotional merchandise (like wristbands or playing cards). The English DVDs only provide the English-dubbed and edited episodes with optional Spanish voice-track, and they all come with the same bonus features (trailers of Mega Man Battle Network video games or promotional screens for merchandise). They also come with occasional promotional merchandise (like Battle Chips for the PET toys). Additionally, the episodes featured are the Canadian versions; in certain instances, the versions that aired on Kids' WB in the United States were heavily altered (including the combination of certain episodes into one) or were not aired at all.

The 50-minute feature film, Rockman EXE the Movie: Program of Light and Dark, also received a DVD release on September 21, 2005, in Japan. The DVD includes a trailer for the sixth video game, a teaser for the fourth anime series (Beast), and a BassCross E-Reader card for use on Mega Man Battle Network 5. The DVD does not include the Duel Masters movie (which premiered in theaters as a double-feature alongside the film).

=== Japanese DVDs (EXE) ===
Name	Release date	Episode #	Cover art
Rockman EXE First Area, Volume 1	2002-07-24	1-2	Lan and MegaMan
Rockman EXE First Area, Volume 2	2002-08-28	3-5	Maylu and Roll
Rockman EXE First Area, Volume 3	2002-09-26	6-8	Dex and GutsMan
Rockman EXE First Area, Volume 4	2002-10-23	9-11	Chaud and ProtoMan
Rockman EXE First Area, Volume 5	2002-11-27	12-14	Yai and Glide
Rockman EXE First Area, Volume 6	2002-12-26	15-17	Higsby and NumberMan
Rockman EXE First Area, Volume 7	2003-01-29	18-20	Maysa and SharkMan
Rockman EXE First Area, Volume 8	2003-02-26	21-23	Sal and WoodMan
Rockman EXE First Area, Volume 9	2003-03-26	24-26	Miyu and SkullMan
Rockman EXE Second Area, Volume 1	2003-04-23	27-29	MegaMan, Roll, GutsMan, IceMan, Glide, ProtoMan
Rockman EXE Second Area, Volume 2	2003-05-28	30-32	MegaMan and ProtoMan, Lan and Chaud
Rockman EXE Second Area, Volume 3	2003-06-25	33-35	MegaMan and Roll, Lan and Maylu
Rockman EXE Second Area, Volume 4	2003-06-25	36-38	MegaMan and GutsMan, Lan and Dex
Rockman EXE Second Area, Volume 5	2003-07-30	39-41	MegaMan and Glide, Lan and Yai
Rockman EXE Second Area, Volume 6	2003-07-30	42-44	MegaMan and IceMan, Lan and Tory
Rockman EXE Second Area, Volume 7	2003-08-27	45-47	MegaMan and NumberMan, Lan and Higsby
Rockman EXE Second Area, Volume 8	2003-08-27	48-50	MegaMan and SharkMan, Lan and Maysa
Rockman EXE Second Area, Volume 9	2003-09-25	51-53	MegaMan and WoodMan, Lan and Sal
Rockman EXE Second Area, Volume 10	2003-09-25	54-56	MegaMan and SkullMan, Lan and Miyu

=== Japanese DVDs (Axess) ===
Name	Release date	Episode #	Cover art
Rockman EXE Axess, Volume 1	2004-04-07	1-2	Lan, MegaMan, CF-MegaMan
Rockman EXE Axess, Volume 2	2004-04-21	3-5	MegaMan, Roll, RollSoul
Rockman EXE Axess, Volume 3	2004-05-19	6-8	MegaMan, TorchMan, TorchSoul
Rockman EXE Axess, Volume 4	2004-06-19	9-11	MegaMan, GutsMan, GutsSoul
Rockman EXE Axess, Volume 5	2004-07-14	12-14	MegaMan, NumberMan, NumberSoul
Rockman EXE Axess, Volume 6	2004-08-18	15-17	MegaMan, HeavyMetalMan, MetalSoul
Rockman EXE Axess, Volume 7	2004-09-15	18-20	MegaMan, SearchMan, SearchSoul
Rockman EXE Axess, Volume 8	2004-10-20	21-23	MegaMan, ProtoMan, ProtoSoul
Rockman EXE Axess, Volume 9	2004-11-17	24-26	MegaMan, SpoutMan, SpoutSoul
Rockman EXE Axess, Volume 10	2004-12-15	27-29	MegaMan, ThunderMan, ThunderSoul
Rockman EXE Axess, Volume 11	2005-01-19	30-32	MegaMan, WoodMan, WoodSoul
Rockman EXE Axess, Volume 12	2005-02-16	33-35	MegaMan, WindBlastMan, WindSoul
Rockman EXE Axess, Volume 13	2005-03-16	36-38	MegaMan, JunkDataMan, JunkSoul
Rockman EXE Axess, Volume 14	2005-03-16	39-41	Chaud, ProtoMan, CF-ProtoMan
Rockman EXE Axess, Volume 15	2005-04-20	42-44	Yuri, SpikeMan, CF-SpikeMan
Rockman EXE Axess, Volume 16	2005-04-20	45-47	Regal, LaserMan, CF-LaserMan
Rockman EXE Axess, Volume 17	2005-05-18	48-51	CF-MegaMan, CF-LaserMan, ShadeMan

=== Japanese DVDs (Stream) ===
Name	Release date	Episode #	Cover art
Rockman EXE Stream, Volume 1	2005-05-18	1-2	Lan, MegaMan, CF-MegaMan
Rockman EXE Stream, Volume 2	2005-06-15	3-5	Chaud, ProtoMan, CF-ProtoMan
Rockman EXE Stream, Volume 3	2005-07-20	6-8	Raika, SearchMan, CF-SearchMan
Rockman EXE Stream, Volume 4	2005-08-18	9-11	Yuri, SpikeMan, CF-SpikeMan
Rockman EXE Stream, Volume 5	2005-09-21	12-14	Tesla, MagnetMan, CF-MagnetMan
Rockman EXE Stream, Volume 6	2005-10-19	15-17	Maylu, Roll, CF-Roll
Rockman EXE Stream, Volume 7	2005-11-16	18-20	Charlie, GyroMan, CF-GyroMan
Rockman EXE Stream, Volume 8	2005-12-14	21-23	Dingo, TomahawkMan, CF-TomahawkMan
Rockman EXE Stream, Volume 9	2006-01-18	24-26	Jasmine, Meddy, CF-Meddy
Rockman EXE Stream, Volume 10	2006-02-15	27-29	Princess Pride, KnightMan, CF-KnightMan
Rockman EXE Stream, Volume 11	2006-03-15	30-32	Fyrefox, MoltanicMan, CF-MoltanicMan
Rockman EXE Stream, Volume 12	2006-04-19	33-35	Dusk, ShadowMan, CF-ShadowMan
Rockman EXE Stream, Volume 13	2006-05-17	36-38	Baryl, Colonel, CF-Colonel
Rockman EXE Stream, Volume 14	2006-05-17	39-41	Lan, Maylu, Rush
Rockman EXE Stream, Volume 15	2006-06-21	42-44	Dark MegaMan, Regal, MegaMan
Rockman EXE Stream, Volume 16	2006-06-21	45-47	Duo, Bass, Slur
Rockman EXE Stream, Volume 17	2006-07-19	48-51	MegaMan, Lan, all 12 CF-Members

=== Japanese DVDs (Beast) ===
Name	Release date	Episode #	Cover art
Rockman EXE Beast, Volume 1	2006-07-19	1-3	Gregar, Lan, Gregar-Beast MegaMan
Rockman EXE Beast, Volume 2	2006-08-18	4-6	Falzar, Lan, Falzar-Beast MegaMan
Rockman EXE Beast, Volume 3	2006-08-18	7-9	MegaMan, Trill, Iris
Rockman EXE Beast, Volume 4	2006-09-20	10-12	SlashMan, Mick, Pat
Rockman EXE Beast, Volume 5	2006-09-20	13-15	TenguMan, ChargeMan, Feng Tian, Al Ferry
Rockman EXE Beast, Volume 6	2006-10-18	16-18	Blackbeard, DiveMan, Yuika, CircusMan
Rockman EXE Beast, Volume 7	2006-10-18	19-21	Scythe, EraseMan, Maysa
Rockman EXE Beast, Volume 8	2006-11-15	22-25	Grezar, Lan, MegaMan (Jūka Style)

=== Japanese DVDs (Beast+) ===
Since Beast+ episodes are half the length of a normal episode, placing six episodes on a single DVD is equivalent to placing the standard three episodes that previous DVDs have featured, and similarly, having eight episodes on the final volume is equivalent to having four standard episodes.

Name	Release date	Episode #	Cover art
Rockman EXE Beast+, Volume 1	2006-12-20	1-6	Zero, CF-MegaMan, Professor
Rockman EXE Beast+, Volume 2	2006-12-20	7-12	Mr. Wily, MegaMan, Lan
Rockman EXE Beast+, Volume 3	2007-01-17	13-18	Vic, Ito, ElementMan, JudgeMan
Rockman EXE Beast+, Volume 4	2007-01-17	19-26	MegaMan, Lan, Cache

=== English DVDs & VHS tapes ===
The episodes included go by the English version's numbering. VHS releases only include the first six volumes, and they only contain the first three episodes from their DVD counterparts (so every fourth episode was missing in the VHS releases). The VHS release dates were simultaneous with the DVD releases.

Name	Release date	Episode #	Episode Name
MegaMan NT Warrior, Volume 1 (Jack In!) (cover art: MegaMan, Lan)	2004-08-24	1-4	1."Jack-in! MegaMan!"; 2."Subway Scramble!"; 3."Traffic Signal Chaos!"; 4."Count to Three!"
MegaMan NT Warrior, Volume 2 (Log On!) (cover art: Maylu, Roll)	2004-10-19	5-8	5."Robotic Fish Gone Wild!"; 6."The Yoga Warrior!"; 7."N1 Grand Prix!"; 8."Skullmania!"
MegaMan NT Warrior, Volume 3 (Power Up!) (cover art: MegaMan, GutsMan)	2004-11-23	9-12	9."Wacky Madness & Blazing Battles! (Part 1)"; 10."Wacky Madness & Blazing Battles! (Part 2)"; 11."Street Fight!"; 12."The Legendary Program Advance!"
MegaMan NT Warrior, Volume 4 (Download!) (cover art: MegaMan, TorchMan)	2005-02-15	13-16	13."The Solo NetNavis!"; 14."Something's Fishy with Commander Beef!"; 15."Evil Empress Roll! (Part 1)"; 16."Evil Empress Roll! (Part 2)"
MegaMan NT Warrior, Volume 5 (N1 Grand Prix!) (cover art: MegaMan, ProtoMan)	2005-04-12	17-20	17."There's No "I" in Team (Part 1)"; 18."There's No "I" in Team (Part 2)"; 19."That Sinking Feeling"; 20."PharaohMan Reborn"
MegaMan NT Warrior, Volume 6 (Upgrade!) (cover art: MegaMan, PharaohMan)	2005-07-05	21-24	21."Rebuilding MegaMan"; 22."MegaMan Lives!"; 23."MegaMan Stolen!"; 24."SnakeMan's Survival Seven"
MegaMan NT Warrior, Volume 7 (NetCity!) (cover art: ElecTeam MegaMan, MagnetMan)	2005-10-25	25-28	25."Netcity!"; 26."The Virus Factory!"; 27."Electronic Money Panic!"; 28."Countdown to Catastrophe!"
MegaMan NT Warrior, Volume 8 (DenTech Troubles!) (cover art: WoodShield MegaMan, FreezeMan)	2006-01-31	29-32	29."DenTech City's Deep Freeze!"; 30."Crimson Flash!"; 31."The CutMan Brothers!"; 32."Working for Grave!"
MegaMan NT Warrior, Volume 9 (BattleChip In!) (cover art: HeatGuts MegaMan, KnightMan)	2006-04-11	33-36	33."Chisao's in Town!"; 34."KnightMan's Betrayal!"; 35."To the Moon!"; 36."Mr. Wily's Legacy!"
MegaMan NT Warrior, Volume 10 (Grave Warning!) (cover art: AquaCustom MegaMan, Bass)	2006-07-04	37-40	37."The Netmobile Grand Prix!"; 38."The Virus Beast!"; 39."Grave!"; 40."Bass!"
MegaMan NT Warrior, Volume 11 (Virus Busters!) (cover art: MegaMan, Grave VirusBeast)	2006-10-17	41-44	41."The End of the End!"; 42."Virus Busters!"; 43."Ice Ice Baby!"; 44."Game Off!"
MegaMan NT Warrior, Volume 12 (NetBattle!) (cover art: MegaMan, ElecMan)	2007-01-17	45-48	45."Hot Tempers!"; 46."Don't Mess with Mama Zap!"; 47."The Great Curry NetBattle!"; 48."Guess Who's Coming to NetBattle?"
MegaMan NT Warrior, Volume 13 (CyberClash!) (cover art: MegaMan, Roll, Glide, GutsMan, IceMan, ProtoMan)	2007-03-06	49-52	49."Chess Mess!"; 50."The Incredible Rush!"; 51."The Netbattle of Hearts!"; 52."From Here to Revolutionary PETs!"

== See also ==
- List of MegaMan NT Warrior episodes (EXE)
