= List of Ultraman Z characters =

This is the character list of 2020 Ultra Series Ultraman Z, as well as its related spin-offs; Ultra Galaxy Fight: The Absolute Conspiracy and Sevenger Fight.

== STORAGE ==
Anti-Monster Robot Unit STORAGE (対怪獣ロボット部隊 ストレイジ, Tai Kaijū Robotto Butai Sutoreiji) (Note: STORAGE stands for Special Tactical Operations Regimental Airborne and Ground Equipment (対怪獣特殊空挺機甲隊, Tai Kaijū Tokushu Kūtei Kikō-tai).) is an attack team established to fight monsters and the disasters they create using special anti-monster combat robots. Their preference in robots is due to Japan's popular culture with it. The team itself is separated into two divisions: the Special Airborne Armor that actively combat monsters and the mechanic team that repairs SAA machines. Nonetheless, both factions are easily cooperative with each other. After the destruction of Kelbim through a test run with D4 Ray, STORAGE was disbanded when the majority of its members protested Kuriyama and the upper command of GAFJ for their unethical use of D4. Whereas a portion of them were relegated to different jobs in separate departments, Yoko and a handful of former members were given positions in its succeeding group, SAAG. At the time of Celebro's reign of terror towards the entire globe as Destrudos, Hebikura/Juggler amasses the former STORAGE members and mutinied against the SAAG to take down the alien parasite in a final fight that determines the fate of the Planet Earth. At the end of the battle, STORAGE was reinstated into GAFJ with Celebro under captivity, while Hebikura/Juggler and Haruki had since left the team for outer space.

When a STORAGE member piloted a SAA unit, remaining operatives in the field would usually drive into the scene with a Toyota LQ-based STEGG (ステッグ, Suteggu) (Note: STEGG is a portmanteau of "storage" and "egg".) patrol car and armed with a beam rifle.

STORAGE's artificial intelligence is voiced by Katsumi Fukuhara (福原 かつみ, Fukuhara Katsumi).

=== Haruki Natsukawa ===
Haruki Natsukawa (ナツカワ ハルキ, Natsukawa Haruki) (Note: In the 268 issue of Figure-Oh magazine, the characters are referred to their names in Kanji: Haruki Natsukawa (夏川 遥輝), Shota Hebikura (蛇倉 正太), Yoko Nakashima (中島 洋子), Kojiro Inaba (稲葉 虎二郎), Yuka Ohta (大田 結花), Kuriyama (栗山) and Shinya Kaburagi (鏑木 慎也).) is the 23-year-old protagonist of the series, a rookie pilot of STORAGE and a Karate master with a huge sense of justice. He bonded with Z after a near-death experience and ever since then transforms into the giant to combat daily monster attacks. At some point in the fight against the Red Kings, Haruki begins to doubt the ideas of "lives to be protected" and "beings to be killed" after realizing that some of the monsters he fought were not inherently malicious, until the visit to his father in his past puts his doubts to rest. During the disbandment of STORAGE, Haruki was relegated to SAAG's guarding officer before Juggler reformed their old team to rescue Yoko and defeating Destrudos. At the end of the final episode, Haruki decided to depart for outer space in order to help those in need, forcing him to part ways with STORAGE members but swears to return for Bon Festival and New Years Day celebration.

Using the Ultra Z Riser (ウルトラゼットライザー, Urutora Zetto Raizā) and his personalized Ultra Access Card (ウルトラアクセスカード, Urutora Akusesu Kādo), Haruki can transform into Ultraman Z and his different forms. By scanning three different Ultra Medals (ウルトラメダル, Urutora Medaru) stored in his Z Holder (ゼットホルダー, Zetto Horudā), Haruki can grant Z access to different forms based on past Ultra Warriors and perform the Ultra's finishing moves. The Z Riser was developed by Ultraman Hikari and received its name when Ultraman Z volunteered to be a tester under Zero's suggestion.

Haruki Natsukawa is portrayed by Kohshu Hirano (平野 宏周, Hirano Kōshū). As a child, Haruki is portrayed by Sōma Ueno (上野 蒼真, Ueno Sōma).

=== Shota Hebikura/Jugglus Juggler ===
Shota Hebikura (ヘビクラ ショウタ, Hebikura Shōta) is STORAGE's 34-year-old captain who acts as an older brother-like figure to the rest of his young teammates. Like Haruki, Hebikura is also athletic and usually puts the rookie through intensive drills in the training room. His true identity is Phantom Demon Jugglus Juggler (無幻魔人 ジャグラスジャグラー, Mugen Majin Jagurasu Jagurā), the rival character from Ultraman Orb who plans to steal mankind's strongest robot in order to prove himself worthy after being humiliated for slicing the Tree of Life back in Ultraman Orb: The Origin Saga. Despite bidding his time in STORAGE to steal one of their SAA Units, Juggler went into developing a genuine bond with the team members and would resort to use whatever necessary methods to keep them safe.

As revealed in Life's Decision Height: The Story of STORAGE's Foundation, Juggler arrived on Earth in year 2010 after chasing Grigio Raiden. He slipped into the ranks of GAFJ by replacing the recently deceased member Shota Hebikura and passing off his different appearance as a case of reconstructive surgery from the accident. Fast forward to the present day in Ultraman Z, he crafted his own Dark Z Riser (ダークゼットライザー, Dāku Zetto Raizā) from Haruki/Z's Z Riser during Peguila's incident, allowing him to become Zeppandon or any of the fusion monsters. Although mostly on-duty as Hebikura, Juggler would resort to his Demon form during undercover missions and spying on Celebro's schemes. After STORAGE's disbandment, Juggler quit the GAFJ as a whole and exposed his identity to Haruki/Z after rescuing Yoko from Ultroid Zero, but chooses to save his former co-worker over stealing the Ultroid Zero to himself. With Destrudos running rampant across the world, Juggler reform STORAGE to reclaim their facility and incapacitated the SAAG members before they commenced their attack. After Celebro's capture by Yuka, Juggler decided to leave the team and embark for outer space, finally returning to his old tuxedo.

- Combined Lord Monster Zeppandon (合体魔王獣 ゼッパンドン, Gattai Maō-jū Zeppandon; 5, 24): A fusion of Zetton, Pandon and Maga-Orochi's tail that debuted in episode 16 of Ultraman Orb. After creating his copy of Z Riser, the Monster Medals of their components also allow him to reform said monster for combat purposes, first used to test Z's Z Lance Arrow. In addition to the Tri/Five King, Zeppandon and the Dark Z Riser was Juggler's sole means of fighting giant opponents after losing his ability to become giant prior to the series. Juggler reused Zeppandon for the second and final time in order to fight Five King/Celebro over the possession of Ultroid Zero. The resulting fight ended with a stalemate when Juggler was forced to abandon Ultroid for Haruki's life, effectively destroying his Dark Z Riser.
- Tri-King and Five King: See below

Takaya Aoyagi (青柳 尊哉, Aoyagi Takaya) reprises his role as Jugglus Juggler.

=== Yoko Nakashima ===
Yoko Nakashima (ナカシマ ヨウコ, Nakashima Yōko) is a 24-year-old female member and ace pilot of STORAGE. She has admiration for older men and Ultraman Z, often referring to him as "Lord Z". Because of her higher score in test piloting, Yoko is usually assigned to pilot the King Joe STORAGE Custom, as she is capable of handling the robot's complex systems.

Yoko's father was a GAFJ officer who taught her in self-defense skills and shaped her mentality into dating stronger men. This resulted in her frequently challenging her admirers to arm-wrestling matches which she has never once lost. After STORAGE's disbandment, Yoko was conscripted into SAAG to pilot the Ultroid Zero. In the penultimate episode, Celebro possessed Yoko as its final host and prepares to exterminate mankind by piloting Ultroid Zero, later Destrudos. Yoko was rescued by Haruki through King Joe STORAGE Custom, where she exorcised Celebro on her own and reclaim the Belial Medal for Z to reform Delta Rise Claw.

Yoko Nakashima is portrayed by Rima Matsuda (松田 リマ, Matsuda Rima).

=== Kojiro Inaba ===
Kojiro Inaba (イナバ コジロー, Inaba Kojirō) is the 59-year-old leader of STORAGE's mechanics division in maintaining their Special Aircraft robots and is deeply trusted by other co-workers. He is nicknamed "Bako" (バコさん, Bako-san) and gives off a Shōwa atmosphere.

As revealed in Life's Decision Height: The Story of STORAGE's Foundation novel, Inaba joined the Global Allied Forces in his late 20s. After several promotions, he was assigned to the Institute of Advanced Studies, participating in the development of weapons and serving as a test pilot. While secretly designing bipedal robots in his spare time, he was introduced to Kuriyama by then-GAFJ director Kimisaki, wherein both of them established the GAFJ robot development department in 2009. Although reluctant to use Grigio Raiden as a reference material, Kuriyama managed to persuade Inaba by taking full responsibility.

Following STORAGE's disbandment in the present day by Celebro-possessed Kuriyama, Inaba quit GAFJ and entrusting his former workers in SAAG to take care of the SAA Units. He eventually returned when Juggler decided to reform the team and piloted Sevenger during their operation to save Yoko.

Kojiro Inaba is portrayed by Jun Hashizume (橋爪 淳, Hashizume Jun).

=== Yuka Ohta ===
Yuka Ohta (オオタ ユカ, Ōta Yuka) is the 22-year-old lead scientist with passion for monsters, hence her occupation in STORAGE allows her to observe them closely. Yuka develops the anti-monster combat robots and knowledgeable about biology and historic legends, which help with her analysis. When conducting experiments on monsters, Yuka brings their essence or specific body parts to STORAGE's headquarters for examination. She often makes and offers questionable juice mix with mysterious ingredients to others.

Yuka's fondness in monsters started in her great-grandmother's hometown, Shishigaoka Town (獅子ヶ丘町, Shishigaoka-chō), 18 years prior to the series. During her stay at her great-grandmother's home, after hearing the legend of Horoboros from her great-grandmother, she encountered the very monsters when she was lost in its territory at night. After STORAGE's disbandment, Yuka was relegated into a researcher in Monster Research Center until Juggler saved her from the GAFJ forces and rejoined STORAGE to rescue Yoko from Destrudos. When the monster was destroyed, Yoko and Kaburagi managed to catch Celebro for dissection.

Yuka usually carries a personal tablet for communication and analysis purposes. It can also act as a control console by attaching it to a SAA Unit's cockpit. The only SAA she ever piloted was the King Joe STORAGE Custom, remote controlling the Leg Carrier to assist Yoko/Sevenger in finishing Barossa III.

Yuka Ohta is portrayed by Hikari Kuroki (黒木 ひかり, Kuroki Hikari). As a child, Yuka is portrayed by Azuki Terada (寺田 藍月, Terada Azuki).

=== Other members ===
- Satoshi (サトシ): (Note: The surnames of Satoshi, Seiji, and Hiroshi are Watasaki (ワタサキ), Siose (シオセ, Shiose), and Irizuki (イリヅキ) respectively, according to Uchusen Yearbook 2021 magazine.) One of Yoko's admirers and loses in an arm-wrestling match in order to ask her out on a date. During STORAGE's disbandment and formation of SAAG, Satoshi choose to quit GAFJ out of protest against their upper management. He is portrayed by Reo Sato (佐藤 玲央, Satō Reo).
- Seiji (セイジ): A member of Satoshi's circle of friends. Alongside Hiroshi, he choose to join the succeeding group SAAG despite Satoshi's protest, as both men wanting to provide financial support for their family members. He is portrayed by Fuma Kakuda (角田 楓馬, Kakuda Fūma).
- Hiroshi (ヒロシ): He is portrayed by Daichi Takaoka (高岡 大地, Takaoka Daichi).
- Sōsuke Yoshida (ヨシダ ソウスケ, Yoshida Sōsuke): An unseen STORAGE member who is in charge of public relations, constantly publishing reports of STORAGE's exploits after their fight. He was a former schoolmate of Haruki during their days in defense force academy.

=== SC ===
The SC (特空機, Tokkūki; also known as SAA, "Special Airborne Armor"), short for Anti-Monster Special Airborne Armor (対怪獣特殊空挺機甲, Tai Kaijū Tokushu Kūtei Kikō) are giant robots manufactured by STORAGE in order to combat against monsters and participating in rescue operations. The mechas were developed by lead scientist Yuka and maintained by Inaba's team of mechanics after each sortie. Due to limited budget, only two units (Sevenger and Windom) were initially manufactured, although additional models are considered for development. As revealed by the director, the SC units were made based on GAFJ's decade-long attempt in studying and reverse-engineer of Grigio Raiden's mechanical physiology on Yamanashi Prefecture. With the sole exception of Sevenger, who had been sent to a museum operated by GAFJ to promote the other machines, the SC Units were assigned to SAAG during STORAGE's temporary disbandment.

- SC-1 Sevenger (特空機1号 セブンガー, Tokkūki Ichi-gō Sebungā): The first of STORAGE's mecha to be created and the first human-built robot mecha, piloted Haruki and/or Yoko. Within each missions, Sevenger can only operate for 3 minutes, based on its three battery packs. In terms of long-distance transportation from STORAGE's base, it has a jetpack with separate fuel. Inaba would modify Sevenger to include Rigid Core Iron Fist Rocket (硬芯鉄拳弾, Kōshin Tekken-dan) punch attack. At some point after Grigio Raiden's death, Sevenger was decommissioned to be put in a museum for display as King Joe took over its role as STORAGE's major SC unit. During STORAGE's disbandment and Alien Barossa III's attack, Yoko choose to pilot Sevenger in against the alien and finish it with Beliarok's help. In the final battle against Destrudos, Inaba piloted Sevenger with the Super Rigid Core Drill Fist (超硬芯回転鉄拳, Chō Kōshin Kaiten Tekken) to support Haruki/King Joe SC and Juggler/Windom during their operation to save Yoko. First appeared in episode 34 of Ultraman Leo, Sevenger's introduction to the series was suggested by director Taguchi for a cuter character and to prevent Ultraman Z from being overshadowed by stronger robots at the series' premier. In Sevenger Fight, Sevenger was given a faulty rifle named SC Support Weapon 40mm General Purpose Autocannon (特空機支援火器40ミリ汎用機関砲, Tokkūki Shien Kaki Yonjū-miri Han'yō Kikan-hō) and Type-20 Bayonet Type-2 (20式銃剣2型, Nijū-shiki Jūken Ni-gata) dagger.
  - Underwater Sevenger (水中セブンガー, Suichū Sebungā): (Note: Short for Underwater Combat Equipment Mounted Type Sevenger (水中戦闘装備搭載型セブンガー, Suichū Sentō Sōbi Tōsai-gata Sebungā).) An underwater-oriented armament for Sevenger, which includes the Type-18 120mm Monster Capture Cannon (18式120mm捕獣砲, Jū-hachi-shiki Hyaku-nijū-mirimētoru Hojū-hō) harpoon cannon. Prior to Ultraman Z's arrival in Fight! Sevenger, STORAGE were ordered to take care of Deeplus' attack in Suruga Bay. Bako and his team of mechanics modified Sevenger into an underwater combat robot, which Haruki piloted and fired the harpoon onto the monster. When Deeplus damaged Sevenger's jetpack, Haruki made use of the incident by dragging the monster to the surface.
  - SC-1M Space Sevenger (特空機1号改 宇宙セブンガー, Tokkūki Ichi-gō Kai Uchū Sebungā): A modified variant of Sevenger which Yuka constructed for space exploration, appeared exclusively in episodes 6 and 7 of Sevenger Fight. At some point after Haruki and Z's departure to outer space, Yoko and Yuka boarded Sevenger in a test drive to Mars, but its warp drive broke mid-journey, forcing the robot to crash landed in a planet where monsters were running wild. It received assistance from both Juggler and Ultraman Z Beta Smash. Its weapon is the Type-20 Versatile Electromagnetic Baton (20式多用途電磁警棒, Nijū-shiki Tayōto Denji Keibō).
  - Sevenger: Mega Water Cannon Pack Equipped Type (セブンガー・メガ放水パック装備型, Sebungā Mega Hōsui Pakku Sōbi-gata): A water dispensing equipment that Sevenger armed with in order to counter Vortech Fire's attack, only for said equipment to be destroyed. Appeared exclusively in chapter 7 of Fight! Sevenger.
  - Fireproof Armor (耐火装甲, Taika Sōkō): A set of armor that covers Sevenger on every parts of the body, save for the head and arm joints. Created from the analysis of Vortech Fire's attacks, it is capable of resisting against opponents with flame attacks and has a built-in cooling system. The armor was used in chapters 10 and 11 of Fight! Sevenger and is later purged from the titular robot by Yoko in order to continue the fight with Ashuran.
- XSAA-8 SC-2 Prototype Machine (特空機2号試作機, Tokkūki Ni-gō Shisakuki): The machine which serves as a prototype to Windom that appeared in Fight! Sevenger chapter 8, which Yoko piloted to assist Haruki/Sevenger in carrying Red Smogy towards Vortech Fire.
- SC-2 Windom (特空機2号 ウインダム, Tokkūki Ni-gō Uindamu): The second of STORAGE's mecha, presented as speedy and versatile. Its weapons are Laser Shot (レーザーショット, Rēzā Shotto) from forehead, Fast-Rotating Rigid Core Iron Fist (高回転硬芯鉄拳, Kō Kaiten Kōshin Tekken) arms and Type-20 Anti-Monster Guided Missiles (20式対怪獣誘導弾, Nijū-shiki Tai Kaijū Yūdō-dan) fired from its porous rocket boosters. Due to its lighter built, the robot is capable of operating for a longer period than Sevenger. Yuka discovered too late that its internal workings are different from her original plan, thus the charging period took longer than the intended process. Using a piece of Neronga's horn, she was able to speed up the process, allowing Windom to assist Z in against Telesdon/Erimaki Telesdon. After that, a new battery was made based on Neronga's horn. Although Windom went on to be piloted by Haruki once Yoko get to board King Joe SC, Juggler piloted it in the final battle against Destrudos in their operation to save Yoko. First appeared in episode 1 of Ultraseven.
- SC-3 King Joe STORAGE Custom (特空機3号 キングジョー ストレイジカスタム, Tokkūki San-gō Kingu Jō Sutoreiji Kasutamu): STORAGE's own attempt at reverse-engineering Alien Barossa's King Joe robot after they salvaged its remains, designating the unit as a firepower type. Through analysis on the Pedan technology, STORAGE was able to construct an engine with 5 times of Windom's original output.
  - Robot Mode (ロボットモード, Robotto Mōdo): King Joe SC's default form, armed with Pedanium Particle Cannon (ペダニウム粒子砲, Pedaniumu Ryūshi-hō) on the right, Pedanium Hammer (ペダニウムハンマー, Pedaniumu Hanmā) on the left and Pedanium Guided Missiles (ペダニウム誘導弾, Pedaniumu Yūdō-dan) from its back. In against a group of Kelbim, King Joe SC was fitted with the D4 Ray under Kuriyama (Celebro)'s order as a test run, effectively causing an entire city block to be devoured by a dimensional collapse until Z neutralizes it. It was finally piloted by Haruki in STORAGE's final stand against Destrudos, using King Joe SC's Pedanium Hammer to burst through the monster to rescue Yoko from Celebro's possession.
  - Separate Mode (セパレートモード, Separēto Mōdo): King Joe SC's separative form into four vehicles; Head Fighter (ヘッドファイター, Heddo Faitā), Breast Tank (ブレストタンク, Buresuto Tanku), Core Ship (コアシップ, Koa Shippu) and Leg Carrier (レッグキャリアー, Reggu Kyariā). The Core Ship is the robot's main cockpit and through there, the other parts can also be controlled remotely.
  - Tank Mode (タンクモード, Tanku Mōdo): An alternate configuration of King Joe SC's parts into a form resembling a tank. In addition to retaining its armaments, King Joe SC can also use smoke grenades as a form of concealment.

== GAFJ ==
Global Allied Forces Japan (地球防衛軍日本支部, Chikyū Bōei-gun Nihon Shibu; GAFJ) is the Japanese branch of the Global Allied Forces, an organization authorized to deal against monster attacks.

At some point after Baraba's demise, GAFJ begins to experiment with remnants of the energy from Yapool's dimension through analysis of Baraba's sword, through which they harvested and weaponized into the Different Dimension Destruction Device D4 Ray (異次元壊滅兵器 D4レイ, Ijigen Kaimetsu Heiki Dī Fō Rei), as part of their warfare against monsters. Due to STORAGE members protest after seeing its unethical use to destroy a group of Kelbim, Kuriyama (Celebro) had them disbanded and replaced with the 1st Special Airborne Armorer Group (第一特殊空挺機甲群, Dai Ichi Tokushu Kūtei Kikō-gun), abbreviated as SAAG (特機群, Tokki-gun), to manage the SAA units in against future monster attacks. When STORAGE was reformed to reclaim their base, Juggler incapacitated every available SAAG officers after blocking their entrance.

=== Director Kuriyama ===
Saburō Kuriyama (クリヤマ サブロー, Kuriyama Saburō), addressed as Director Kuriyama (クリヤマ長官, Kuriyama-chōkan) in the series, is the 64-year-old director of the GAFJ and founder of STORAGE. Despite his long, nagging lectures, he is actually a worrywart who is prone to stomach aches. He is often worrying of the collateral damages brought by the monster attacks and the cost for development budget.

As detailed in the Life's Decision Height: The Story of STORAGE's Foundation prequel novel, Kuriyama conceived the idea of fighting monsters with robots since his early days as a deputy director. After voicing his aforementioned idea to his colleagues, then-GAFJ director Kimisaki introduced Kuriyama to Inaba as the two became fast friends and established GAFJ's robot department. When their project hit a dead end, Kuriyama discovered the opportunity to analyze the recently crashed Grigio Raiden as the basis of SAA units, eventually leading to the foundation of STORAGE as well.

During GAFJ's experimentation on D4 Ray, Kuriyama was possessed by Celebro after a run-in with captain Asano, who proceed to use the director's position into authorizing the D4 Ray and the creation of Ultroid Zero. Celebro would left Kuriyama's body for Yoko once his plan nears completion to hijack the Ultroid Zero. He was hospitalized after the incident, but his injuries were scapegoated to STORAGE members per Celebro's plan.

Director Kuriyama is portrayed by Hisahiro Ogura (小倉 久寛, Ogura Hisahiro).

=== Shinya Kaburagi ===
Shinya Kaburagi (カブラギ シンヤ, Kaburagi Shin'ya) is a 26-year-old researcher from GAFJ's Monster Research Center (怪獣研究センター, Kaijū Kenkyū Sentā)'s biochemical research department, a group tasked with the cleanup and research of leftovers from the resulting fight between STORAGE and their monster opponents. While delivering a canister of Genegarg's remains, Celebro possessed him as a medium to operate on Earth. Due to Kaburagi's body sustaining heavy injuries after months of possession, Celebro left him for Asano while pinning all of his crimes to Kaburagi to retain his cover. After Destrudos' destruction, Kaburagi returned to work for MRC and assisted Yuka in catching Celebro when the alien parasite escaped its destruction to dissect its remains.

Shinya Kaburagi is portrayed by Rihito Noda (野田 理人, Noda Rihito).

=== Minor GAFJ officers ===
- Asano (アサノ; 17, 21): (Note: His full name is Takeshi Asano (浅野 武, Asano Takeshi), as seen in Kaburagi's arrest warrant from episode 17.) The captain of GAFJ's police division, who issued an arrest warrant to "Kaburagi" after his numerous atrocities in the monster attacks, unaware that the youth was possessed by Celebro the entire time. Although he managed to pin Kaburagi, Asano was disarmed by Juggler and forcefully possessed by Celebro as a cover before moving on to Kuriyama. He is portrayed by Yosuke Minokawa (三濃川 陽介, Minokawa Yōsuke).
- Mai Yuki (ユウキ マイ, Yūki Mai; 21-25): GAFJ's chief of operations, she is the head of the development project for Ultroid Zero, as well as the captain of the newly formed SAAG following STORAGE's disbandment. An arrogant war hawk, she is prideful in the development of D4 and its use as a weapon, regardless of casualties involved. When Kuriyama (Celebro) framed the former STORAGE members as aliens in the height of Ultroid Zero's hijacking and global-scale terrorism, she tries to counter the reformed STORAGE's munity with the order shoot to kill, but was incapacitated by Juggler. She is portrayed by Maya Hayashi (林 摩耶, Hayashi Maya).
- Kimisaki (キミサキ): The former GAFJ director who preceded Kuriyama prior to the series. In Life's Decision Height: The Story of STORAGE's Foundation, he introduced then-deputy director Kuriyama to Inaba after he voiced the opinion to use giant robots.
- Special Airborne Armor Development and Test Unit (特殊空挺機甲開発実験団, Tokushu Kūtei Kikō Kaihatsu Jikken-dan): An organization which Kuriyama and Inaba established in year 2010 for the development of SAA Units, appearing exclusively in Life's Decision Height: The Story of STORAGE's Foundation. After the success of Sevenger in against Namegon and its subsequent missions, the test unit was disbanded and most of its members were reassigned to the Joint Advanced Equipment Research Center (統合先進装備研究所, Tōgō Senshin Sōbi Kenkyūjo), abbreviated as JAERC (統先研, Tōsenken), with STORAGE taking its place.
  - Shota Hebikura: The original Shota Hebikura, who participated in the test unit as their pilot. In August 2013, Hebikura was caught in an accident during the test piloting of a SAA unit that claimed his life. Jugglus Juggler, who had arrived on Earth since 2010, buried Hebikura's lifeless body elsewhere and taking the latter's place in the accident, while his different appearance was passed off as a case of reconstructive surgery in order to slip into the ranks of GAFJ, eventually promoted into STORAGE's captain during the premise of Ultraman Z.
  - Yasuko Kuroe (クロエ ヤスコ, Kuroe Yasuko): A test pilot from Osaka Prefecture who appeared exclusively in Life's Decision Height: The Story of STORAGE's Foundation. Alongside the original Hebikura, she became one of the many test pilots of the SAA prototype and was killed in a piloting accident.

== Ultra Warriors ==
=== Ultraman Z ===
Ultraman Z (ウルトラマンゼット, Urutoraman Zetto) (Note: Also pronounced as Ultraman "Zett".) is the titular hero of the series, a 5,000 year old Inter Galactic Defense Force cadet. Z speaks in an unusual dialect, but overall has a passionate sense of justice and seeks apprenticeship under his idol, Zero. His name was given to him by his godfather Ultraman Ace in the hopes that Z would be the "Last Hero" who would one day bring peace to the universe. As revealed in the Voice Drama series, Z volunteered himself to be a tester for Hikari's new Ultra Riser under Zero's suggestion. As a result, Hikari named the device after Z. He was accepted into the Inter-Galactic Defense Force after he passed his test in a sparring match against Zero.

During the events of Ultra Galaxy Fight: The Absolute Conspiracy, Z accompanied Mebius and Taiga in the fight against the Zetton Army. Although his inexperienced caused him to be outnumbered, Z was saved by the timely arrival of the Ultra League. After failing to save Yullian, Z decided to chase Genegarg for its theft of Ultra Medals. In the series proper, he was entrusted with the Z Riser and chased Genegarg to Earth, where he bonded with Haruki to revive the young pilot's life. In addition to reclaiming the stolen Ultra Medals, Z assisted STORAGE in fighting against monster attacks and Celebro's constant machinations on Earth. After Celebro defeated Z with Destrudos, the Ultra was forced to separate from his host since another transformation would injure their bodies, but Haruki bypassed this restriction in order to save a falling Yoko from Destrudos' clutch. After defeating Destrudos on Earth, Z decided to embark on his mission to outer space, bringing along Haruki and the revived Beliarok.

His Ultra Z Riser, the device which he gave to Haruki as means of transformation, can also double as a combat weapon. His true form is designated as Original (オリジナル, Orijinaru) and is described as a rookie Ultra Warrior whose strength is, according to Zero, roughly half or one third that of an experienced fighter. His finishing move is Zestium Beam (ゼスティウム光線, Zesutiumu Kōsen), which can also be utilized by any of his other forms. In emergencies, Haruki can transform into Z's Original form at human size. However, fighting at human size consumes energy rapidly, meaning Z can only sustain himself for 50 seconds. In the final battle against Destrudos, Z was reduced to Original after Beliarok's destruction, but his strong bonds with Haruki and their combined courage allowed them to keep fighting, managing to fire a Zestium Beam that surpassed Destrudos' D4 Ray and putting an end to Celebro's machinations on Earth. During the events of Ultraman Trigger, Z displays his growth by being able to wield the Beliarok in his Original form. In Ultraman New Generation Stars, Z would receive the New Generation Ultra Hero Cape (ニュージェネレーションウルトラマンケープ, Nyū Jenerēshon Urutoraman Kēpu) generated by its aptly named brooch as he begins to learn of his predecessors and successors' exploits by Ultraman Zero as his final trial to be a fully-fledged Ultra.

To make up for his lack of experience and strength, Z can access Ultra Fusion (ウルトラフュージョン, Urutora Fyūjon) forms when Haruki scans three different Ultra Medals of past Ultra Warriors using the Z Riser. These forms are capable of using a shared additional weapon named Z Lance Arrow (ゼットランスアロー, Zetto Ransu Arō), an ancient artifact from Alaska that was initially utilized by an ancient Ultra to seal Peguila.

- Alpha Edge (アルファエッジ, Arufa Ejji): A speed-based form obtained through Zero, Ultraseven, and Leo's Ultra Medals. Z fights with the use of Space Martial Arts learned from the master-apprentice chain and is able to summon a pair of energy crests as makeshift nunchaku known as Alpha Chain Blade (アルファチェインブレード, Arufa Chein Burēdo). His finishing move is the Zestium Meizer (ゼスティウムメーザー, Zesutiumu Mēzā).
- Beta Smash (ベータスマッシュ, Bēta Sumasshu): A strength-based form obtained through Ultraman, Ace and Taro's Ultra Medals. Z fights with a dignified style akin to a professional wrestler. His finishing move is the Zestium Upper (ゼスティウムアッパー, Zesutiumu Appā). Through sheer will, Z can transform his crest into a set of Ultra Holes (ウルトラホール, Urutora Hōru), resembling Ace's and combine their attack to perform Space Z (スペースZ, Supēsu Zetto).
- Gamma Future (ガンマフューチャー, Ganma Fyūchā): A sorcery-based form obtained through Tiga, Dyna and Gaia's Ultra Medals. He is skilled in versatile beam attacks and tricky fighting styles. The Medals required to access this form were originally salvaged by Juggler before he returned them to Z at the height of Five King's attack. His special move Gamma Illusion (ガンマイリュージョン, Ganma Iryūjon) allows him to summon the Ultras that make up his form to simultaneously fire their beam attacks. His finishing move is the Zestium Drive (ゼスティウムドライブ, Zesutiumu Doraibu).
- Sigma Breastar (シグマブレスター, Shiguma Buresutā): A form that is exclusive to Ultraman Fusion Fight: Z Heat, accessed through the use of Zoffy, Tiga and Mebius' Ultra Medals. It allows Z to freely manipulate heat and is able to exert both brute strength and super speed. His finishing move in this form is the Zestium Ray Burst (ゼスティウムレイバースト, Zesutiumu Rei Bāsuto).
- Delta Rise Claw (デルタライズクロー, Deruta Raizu Kurō): Z's strongest form, obtained from using Zero Beyond, Geed, and Belial Atrocious's Rise Ultra Medals (ライズウルトラメダル, Raizu Urutora Medaru). These Medals evolve respectively from the Zero and Geed Ultra Medals and the Belial Kaiju Medal when gathered together. This form allows Z to generate golden energy storms and is the only one capable of wielding the Beliarok. His finishing move is the Zestium Slash (ゼスティウム光輪, Zesutiumu Kōrin).
  - Deathcium Rise Claw (デスシウムライズクロー, Desushiumu Raizu Kurō): A temporary power-up of Delta Rise Claw that first appears in Ultra Galaxy Fight: The Destined Crossroad. It is assumed when the Beliarok imbues Z with its full dark power, which turns Z's body almost completely black. Z is only able to maintain this state for a short time, as using so much dark power is incredibly taxing on his body. His finishing move is Zestium Death Burst (ゼスティウムデスバースト, Zesutiumu Desu Bāsuto).

Ultraman Z is voiced by Tasuku Hatanaka (畠中 祐, Hanata Tasuku). In the English dub of Ultra Galaxy Fight: The Absolute Conspiracy, he is voiced by Peter von Gomm.

=== Beliarok ===
The Phantasmic Magic Sword Beliarok (幻界魔剣 ベリアロク, Genkai Maken Beriaroku) was originally a space needle required to defeat Greeza by sewing the anomaly itself. When Geed was briefly assimilated into the monster, part of his Belial DNA merged with the sword, giving it sentience and the abilities of Ultraman Belial. Despite being Z's personal weapon, his allegiance is fickle and is able to switch to other users so long that they satisfy his own interest. Although Juggler won the Beliarok fair and square, the weapon decided to stick to Haruki after having faith in the young boy's ability to satiate his interest. The Beliarok was initially killed in its attempt to block a D4 Ray beam from Destrudos, but revived itself and joined Z and Haruki's departure to space.

In addition to redirecting his opponent's attack, the Beliarok can execute three finishers by pressing the button behind his head. The attacks are Deathcium Slash (デスシウムスラッシュ, Desushiumu Surasshu), Deathcium Claw (デスシウムクロー, Desushiumu Kurō) and Deathcium Fang (デスシウムファング, Desushiumu Fangu). Should anyone try to wield Beliarok without his consent, he can deliver a small lightning bolt or increase its own density to prevent from being misused.

The Beliarok is voiced by Yūki Ono (小野 友樹, Ono Yūki).

=== Riku Asakura/Ultraman Geed ===
Riku Asakura (朝倉 リク, Asakura Riku) is the genetically cloned son of late Ultraman Belial, who defy his heritage as Ultraman Geed (ウルトラマンジード, Urutoraman Jīdo) from the series of the same name.

Due to the Devil Splinter being widespread across the universe, Riku participated in the duty to hunt and exterminate them. In Planet Ain (惑星アイン, Wakusei Ain), Riku lost his Geed Riser after being damaged from fighting Gillvalis, forcing Pega to deliver the Z Riser from Ultraman Hikari as a compensation. While chasing the rogue AI to Earth, Riku found himself allying with Z, STORAGE and Juggler before getting kidnapped into manufacturing Belial's Monster Medal. Despite wanting to assist Z in defending Earth, Haruki reassured his senior as he joined Pega in tracking the Devil Splinters in space. Riku returned at some point of time when Greeza rampaged on Earth. While assimilated into the void monster, Geed managed to briefly halt its actions while his Belial DNA created the Beliarok, which Z in the Delta Rise Claw managed to obtain in slaying Greeza. As Hikari had fixed the Geed Riser, Riku decided to give Haruki his own Ultra Medals and resume his original mission.

By inserting his own personalized Ultra Access Card and a trio of Ginga, X and Orb Medals into the Ultra Z Riser, Riku can access a new form of Geed, Galaxy Rising (ギャラクシーライジング, Gyarakushī Raijingu). The form is based on his default Fusion Rise, Primitve, focusing on a balanced fighting style but serve as an upgrade over the former. In the same way as Z, Geed can summon an enlarged Z Riser as a handheld weapon. His finishing move is the Wrecking Phoenix (レッキングフェニックス, Rekkingu Fenikkusu). The three Medals were given to Haruki when Geed's original Riser was fixed, in addition to his own Ultraman Geed Medal (ウルトラマンジードメダル, Urutoraman Jīdo Medaru), which turns into the Ultraman Geed Rise Medal (ウルトラマンジードライズメダル, Urutoraman Jīdo Raizu Medaru) when Z assumes Delta Rise Claw.

- In Ultraman Fusion Fight! Z Heat, Geed can assume a game-exclusive form, Tetraite Cross (テトライトクロス, Tetoraito Kurosu), through Jack, Cosmos and Nexus Medals. This form allows him to erect defensive barriers and performing counter style fighting moves. His finisher is the Giga Field Pressure (ギガフィールドプレッシャー, Giga Fīrudo Puresshā).

Tatsuomi Hamada (濱田 龍臣, Hamada Tatsuomi) reprises his role as Riku Asakura.

=== Sora ===
Sora (ソラ) is a Blue Tribe female Ultra that debuted in Ultraman Festival 2018, before making her video appearances in Ultra Galaxy Fight: The Absolute Conspiracy. (Note: In episode 12 of Ultraman Chronicle D, she is referred to as Ultrawoman Sora (ウルトラウーマンソラ, Urutoraūman Sora).) She worked as a scientist under the tutelage of Ultraman Hikari and is a childhood friend of Ultraman Ribut. In Chapter 1 of The Absolute Conspiracy, Sora and Yullian were present on Planet Kanon when Leugocyte commenced its attack. To rescue Max from being mutated into a monster, Sora volunteered her help to Hikari in creating the Gudis Vaccine (ゴーデスワクチン, Gōdesu Wakuchin). As a result of her contribution to saving Max, she was awarded with a membership in the Galaxy Rescue Force alongside Ribut.

Sora wears the Flower Tector (フラワーテクター, Furawā Tekutā) armor around her torso, allowing her to conjure the Shield Fleur (シールド・フルール, Shīrudo Furūru) energy barrier.

Megumi Han (潘 めぐみ, Han Megumi) reprised her voice role as Sora since Ultraman Festival 2018. Megumi also voiced Ultraman Justice on a dual role in Ultra Galaxy Fight.

=== Ultraman Ribut ===
First appearing in Ultra Galaxy Fight: New Generation Heroes, Ultraman Ribut (ウルトラマンリブット, Urutoraman Ributto) is a member of the Galaxy Rescue Force and the protagonist of The Absolute Conspiracy's first chapter. It focuses on Ribut's early days as a Civilization Guardian before his induction into the Galaxy Rescue Force. While investigating the dying Planet Mikarito, Ribut and Max were caught in Tartarus' plot to strengthen Maga-Orochi by having the latter infected. Ribut survived the fight to report the incident to the Inter-Galactic Defense Force and trained alongside Great and Powered to obtain his Ribut Blocker and Spreader Rod. Through the Gudis Vaccine given by Sora, he purified Max from his infection and together with Xenon, they destroy Maga-Orochi. For his bravery, both Ribut and Sora were recruited into the Galaxy Rescue Force.

In Chapter 3, Ribut and Andro Melos rushed to Planet Maijii to assist the Tri-Squad in their fight against Zett under Zero's wish, wanting the pair and the Tri-Squad to be conscripted into the Ultra League in against Tartarus' schemes. When Yullian was threatened in Planet Ebil, Zero led the Ultra League to her defense, but was unsuccessful in preventing her capture by Tartarus.

He was invited by Zero in episode 20 of Ultraman Z & Ultraman Zero Voice Drama to give Z a lecture about the Galaxy Rescue Force before he left on an emergency.

Wataru Komada (駒田 航, Komada Wataru) reprises his voice role as Ultraman Ribut. In the English dub, he is voiced by Josh Keller.

=== Ultra League ===
The Ultra League (ウルトラリーグ, Urutora Rīgu) is an all-star team formed under Taro's suggestion to foil Tartarus' schemes in The Absolute Conspiracy. Led by Ultraman Zero, its members include alliances from Galaxy Rescue Force and New Generation Heroes. When Yullian was threatened on Planet Ebil by Zett's Zetton Army, the team appeared to support Taiga, Mebius, Z and 80, but was unsuccessful in saving Yullian. As Zero departed during the events of Ultraman Z, remaining team members continue their war against The Kingdom.

The Ultra League is a concept envisioned by director Koichi Sakamoto to unify characters from different generations, as he is well aware that famous teams such as the Ultra Brothers and New Generation Heroes were only fixed by their respective eras.

- Ultraman Joneus (ウルトラマンジョーニアス, Urutoraman Jōniasu; UGF: TAC): The strongest warrior in Planet U40. Before Tartarus could destroy his home planet, Joneus stepped in to defend and forced the alien to retreat. He was recruited by Zero not long after in their campaign against Tartarus. He is voiced by Nobuaki Kanemitsu (金光 宣明, Kanemitsu Nobuaki) in Japanese, and by Ryan Drees in English.
- Ultraman Ribut: See above
- Andro Melos: See below
- Ultrawoman Grigio (ウルトラウーマングリージョ, Urutoraūman Gurījo; UGF: TAC): The youngest sister to Rosso and Blu, transformed from Asahi Minato and named after Saki Mitsurugi's true name. While Rosso and Blu were off-planet to handle the Devil Splinter cases, Grigio was left behind on Ayaka City to fight against Noiseler and Zandrias. She was recruited by Zero in the light of Tartarus' abuse of temporal abilities. Her voice role is reprised by Arisa Sonohara (其原 有沙, Sonohara Arisa) in Japanese and Rumiko Varnes in English.
- Tri-Squad (トライスクワッド, Torai Sukuwaddo): A group of three Ultra Warriors from Ultraman Taiga. After the events of Ultraman Taiga The Movie, the team went to train in Planet Maijii (惑星マイジー, Wakusei Maijī) and were forced to fight against the Zetton Army led by Zett. After being rescued by the Galaxy Rescue Force, Taro conscripted the three into Zero's Ultra League. Without their former human host Hiroyuki Kudo on their side, the Tri-Squad were forced to train rigorously in order to reobtain Tri-Strium as Tri-Strium Rainbow (トライストリウムレインボー, Torai Sutoriumu Reinbō), using the memories and bonds they formed on Earth instead. In place of the Quattro Squad Blaster, they instead initiate the Rainbow Strium Burst (レインボーストリウムバースト, Reinbō Sutoriumu Bāsuto) as their new finishing move.
  - Ultraman Taiga (ウルトラマンタイガ, Urutoraman Taiga; UGF: TAC): The son of Ultraman Taro and the team leader. At some point after training for the Ultra League's mission with Mebius, the pair and Z left for Planet Ebil to save Yullian and 80 from Zett's Zetton Army. His voice role is reprised by Takuma Terashima (寺島 拓篤, Terashima Takuma). In the English dub, he is voiced by Matthew Masaru Barron.
  - Ultraman Titas (ウルトラマンタイタス, Urutoraman Taitasu; UGF: TAC): A U40 Ultra Warrior with emphasis of brute strength. His voice role is reprised by Satoshi Hino (日野 聡, Hino Satoshi). In the English dub, he is voiced by Jeff Manning.
  - Ultraman Fuma (ウルトラマンフーマ, Urutoraman Fūma; UGF: TAC): An Ultra from Planet O-50 using speed and stealth techniques. His voice role is reprised by Shōta Hayama (葉山 翔太, Hayama Shōta). In the English dub, he is voiced by Chris Wells.

=== Other Ultra Warriors ===
In Ultraman Z, the Land of Light developed both the Ultra Z Risers and Ultra Medals to combat multiple universal threats, including widespread cases of Devil Splinter attacks. The theft of these items by Genegarg and its destruction on Earth scattered the Medals across the city, with selected few are already in possession of Haruki and other people. In addition to the sets that Z used into assuming his Ultra Fusions, another six Medals were salvaged by GAFJ for research purposes, but Haruki was able to reclaim them all during the conflict against the first Alien Barossa.

- Inter-Galactic Defense Force (宇宙警備隊, Uchū Keibitai): A peacekeeping organization in the Land of Light, it was founded after Alien Empera's defeat and his army retreating from Nebula M78.
  - Father of Ultra (ウルトラの父, Urutora no Chichi): Originally known as Ultraman Ken, he was a long time comrade of Belial who elevated into the rank of Supreme Commander of the Inter-Galactic Defense Force and courted Marie after defeating Alien Empera during the Great Ultra War. Both of the events however led to his friendship with Belial falling apart. In Ultraman Z, his power inhabited the Father of Ultra Medal (ウルトラの父メダル, Urutora no Chichi Medaru), allowing Z to either execute M78 Style Shining Tornado Slash (M78流・竜巻閃光斬, Emu Nana Hachi Ryū Tatsumaki Senkō Zan) alongside those of Zoffy and Jack or generating an energy sword alongside Ultraman and Jack. In The Absolute Conspiracy, he is voiced by Hajime Iijima (飯島 肇, Iijima Hajime) in Japanese, and by Alexander Hunter in English.
  - Mother of Ultra (ウルトラの母, Urutora no Haha; UGF: TAC): Originally known as Ultrawoman Marie in her younger years, she met her future husband Ken during their war against Alien Empera. By giving Ken the Ultimate Blade (ウルティメイトブレード, Urutimeito Burēdo) from her family heirloom, the latter was able to defeat Empera and liberating the Land of Light from Empera's invasion. Her marriage with Ken was one of the many factors that led to Belial's downfall after he failed to court the young woman. In The Absolute Conspiracy, she is voiced by Suzuko Mimori (三森 すずこ, Mimori Suzuko) in Japanese and by Hannah Grace in English.
  - Ultra Brothers (ウルトラ兄弟, Urutora Kyōdai): A division of 11 Ultras known for their contribution on a different planet Earth. During the events of The Absolute Conspiracy, the core six members of Ultra Brothers fought against the Parallel Isotopes of Juda, Mold, Belial and Tregear. Although managed to destroy the Gua Army commanders, they were defeated by the Absolutian-powered fallen Ultras before Zero interfered.
    - Zoffy (ゾフィー, Zofī; UGF: TAC): The Commander of the Inter-Galactic Defense Force and the leader of Ultra Brothers. In addition to participating in the campaign against Tartarus' grand schemes, a young Zoffy was featured in Belial's past after the latter touched the Plasma Spark. His power inhabited the Zoffy Medal (ゾフィーメダル, Zofī Medaru), which was stolen by Alien Barossa after being salvaged by GAFJ for research purposes. Once reclaimed by Yoko, she delivered it to Z as new additions to his recovered Ultra Medals, allowing him to execute M78 Style Shining Tornado Slash when used alongside Jack and Father of Ultra's Medals. In The Absolute Conspiracy, he is voiced by Shunsuke Takeuchi (武内 駿輔, Takeuchi Shunsuke) in Japanese, and by Ryan Drees in English.
    - Ultraman (ウルトラマン, Urutoraman; UGF: TAC): See here.
    - Ultraseven (ウルトラセブン, Urutorasebun; UGF: TAC): See here.
    - Ultraman Jack (ウルトラマンジャック, Urutoraman Jakku; UGF: TAC): See here.
    - Ultraman Ace (ウルトラマンエース, Urutoraman Ēsu; 19, UGF: TAC): His power inhabited the Ultraman Ace Medal (ウルトラマンエースメダル, Urutoraman Ēsu Medaru) and was salvaged by Haruki after Genegarg's destruction. Prior to the series, Ace was Z's godfather, giving the young warrior his name back in the Land of Light. Ace appeared on Haruki's Earth after being guided by his namesake Medal where he fought against Baraba alongside Z. They combined their energies to form Space Z and brought an end to the Terrible-Monster. In his appearance in Ultraman Z, his voice role is reprised by Keiji Takamine (高峰 圭二, Takamine Keiji).
    - Ultraman Taro (ウルトラマンタロウ, Urutoraman Tarō; UGF: TAC): See here.
    - Ultraman Leo (ウルトラマンレオ, Urutoraman Reo): His power inhabited the Ultraman Leo Medal (ウルトラマンレオメダル, Urutoraman Reo Medaru) and was originally utilized by Zero before the latter relinquished it and two other Medals to Ultraman Z following his banishment into Bullton's alternate dimension. The real Ultraman Leo appears in episode 10 of Sevenger Fight, assisting STORAGE's Sevenger in against an army of monsters in Suflan Island.
    - Ultraman 80 (ウルトラマン80, Urutoraman Eiti; UGF: TAC): One of the many members of the Ultra Brothers, he was established in episode 19 of Ultraman Z & Ultraman Zero Voice Drama to have use his teaching experience at Sakuragaoka Middle School as a teacher in the Land of Light, one of his students being Taiga and Z. In The Absolute Conspiracy, 80 led a strike team consist of Neos and Seven 21 in a campaign against Leugocyte. After Yullian's escort ship was destroyed in Planet Ebil, 80, Mebius, Z and the Ultra League fought against Zett's Zetton Army, but failed to prevent Yullian's capture. His voice role is reprised by Hatsunori Hasegawa (長谷川 初範, Hasegawa Hatsunori). In the English dub, he is voiced by Iain Gibb.
    - Ultraman Mebius (ウルトラマンメビウス, Urutoraman Mebiusu; UGF: TAC): See here.
    - Ultraman Hikari (ウルトラマンヒカリ, Urutoraman Hikari; UGF: TAC): A scientist in the ranks of the Ultra Brothers. In The Absolute Conspiracy, Hikari assisted Sora in the creation of Gudis Vaccine to counter Max's infection. During Tartarus' time travel, events leading to Hikari's downfall became one of the many factors for Tregear to accept Tartarus' offer. Episode 6 of Ultraman Z & Ultraman Zero Voice Drama revealed that he created the Z Riser to fight against the Devil Splinter cases and named it after Ultraman Z when he volunteered to be a tester. In Ultraman Z, Hikari (through Pega) gave Riku a Z Riser and three Ultra Medals as alternatives while fixing the damaged Geed Riser. His voice role in The Absolute Conspiracy is reprised by Keiichi Nanba (難波 圭一, Nanba Keiichi), whereas Chris Wells provided the voice in English dubbing.
  - Yullian (ユリアン, Yurian; UGF: TAC): The royal princess in the Land of Light's monarchy system. She volunteered herself alongside Sora into a diplomatic meeting with Izana on Planet Kanon for a negotiation and was protected by 80 at the last minute from Leugocyte's attack. While being escorted to Planet Kanon for a diplomatic mission with the Galactic Federation, her ship was attacked by Zett and crashed on Planet Ebil, where she was targeted by Tartarus and the Zetton Army. Despite Mebius, Z and the Ultra League's intervention, Yullian was successfully kidnapped by Tartarus in a hostage situation for the Land of Light. She was imprisoned in Narak alongside an unidentified Ultra. She is voiced by Haruka Tomatsu (戸松 遥, Tomatsu Haruka) in Japanese, and by Hannah Grace in English.
  - Ultraman Great (ウルトラマングレート, Urutoraman Gurēto; UGF: TAC): An Ultra who had fought Gudis during his active period on Earth. He mentored Ribut in his training on Planet K76 and gave him his Spreader Rod as a congratulatory gift before accompanying him into Planet Mikarito to save Max. He is voiced by Tomokazu Seki (関 智一, Seki Tomokazu) in Japanese and Eric Kelso in English.
  - Ultraman Powered (ウルトラマンパワード, Urutoraman Pawādo; UGF: TAC): Alongside Great, he is Ribut's instructor and provided the young Ultra his Ribut Blocker once he completed his training. He is voiced by Toshiyuki Morikawa (森川 智之, Morikawa Toshiyuki) in Japanese and Kane Kosugi in English, both of which portrayed/voiced Kenichi Kai in Ultraman: The Ultimate Hero. Kane also provided the grunts of Ultraman Powered in The Absolute Conspiracy in both languages.
  - Ultraman Neos (ウルトラマンネオス, Urutoraman Neosu; UGF: TAC): A member of the Elite Task Force and is part of 80's strike team in against Leugocyte. He is voiced by Ryuya Yazuka (八塚 竜也, Yazuka Ryūya) in Japanese and Jeff Manning in English.
  - Ultraseven 21 (ウルトラセブン21, Urutorasebun Tsū Wan; UGF: TAC): Neos' partner and a member of the Galactic Security Agency, joining 80 as part of his task force. He is voiced by Kenta Matsumoto (松本 健太, Matsumoto Kenta) in Japanese and Josh Keller in English.
  - Ultraman Max (ウルトラマンマックス, Urutoraman Makkusu; UGF: TAC): A Civilization Guardian who mentored Ribut during his younger days. While investigating Planet Mikarito, he was infected by the Gudis Cells by Alien Sran to be turned into a monster while slowly being fed to Maga-Orochi. Ribut managed to rescue him and undo the mutation with Sora's Gudis Vaccine, eventually joined by Xenon to destroy the Maga-Orochi. His voice role is reprised by Kazuya Nakai (中井 和哉, Nakai Kazuya). In the English dub, he is voiced by Maxwell Powers.
  - Ultraman Xenon (ウルトラマンゼノン, Urutoraman Zenon; UGF: TAC): Max's partner and a fellow Civilization Guardian. He delivers the Max Galaxy to recharge his partner's energy and participated in the fight against an empowered Maga-Orochi. He is voiced by Ryota Iwasaki (岩崎 諒太, Iwasaki Ryōta) in Japanese and Iain Gibb in English.
- Ultraman King (ウルトラマンキング, Urutoraman Kingu; UGF: TAC): An elderly Ultra warrior residing in Planet King. Tartarus' actions in orchestrating various events (including his tampering with Maga-Orochi) was detected by King himself in his home planet.
- Ultraman Tiga (ウルトラマンティガ, Urutoraman Tiga): See here.
- Ultraman Dyna (ウルトラマンダイナ, Urutoraman Daina): His power inhabited the Ultraman Dyna Medal (ウルトラマンダイナメダル, Urutoraman Daina Medaru) and was among the set that was salvaged by Juggler before returning it to Z. Using Gamma Future, Z can summon a copy of Dyna as a reinforcement.
- Ultraman Gaia (ウルトラマンガイア, Urutoraman Gaia): His power inhabited the Ultraman Gaia Medal (ウルトラマンガイアメダル, Urutoraman Gaia Medaru) and was among the set that was salvaged by Juggler before returning it to Z. Using Gamma Future, Z can summon a copy of Gaia as a reinforcement.
- Ultraman Legend (ウルトラマンレジェンド, Urutoraman Rejendo; UGF: TAC): A legendary Ultra Warrior resulted from the fusion of Cosmos and Justice. He was formed to counter Tartarus' brief assault on Planet Feed before the golden being escaped.
  - Ultraman Cosmos (ウルトラマンコスモス, Urutoraman Kosumosu; UGF: TAC): The blue warrior of kindness, he and Justice joined the Inter-Galactic Force in their fight against Leugocyte and Tartarus. Cosmos revealed that he and Justice were investigating an energy source that was detected even from the dimension where he briefly fought alongside Zero and Dyna. In Ultraman Z, his power inhabited the Ultraman Cosmos Medal (ウルトラマンコスモスメダル, Urutoraman Kosumosu Medaru). It was originally under GAFJ's possession after being scattered on Earth, but a three-way battle between STORAGE, Alien Barossa and Celebro ensued over its owner until Z reclaim it to execute Lightning Generade (ライトニングジェネレード, Raitoningu Jenerēdo) alongside Nexus and Mebius. In The Absolute Conspiracy, his voice role is reprised by Taiyo Sugiura (杉浦 太陽, Sugiura Taiyō) in Japanese. In the English dub, he is voiced by Peter von Gomm.
  - Ultraman Justice (ウルトラマンジャスティス, Urutoraman Jasutisu; UGF: TAC): A member of the Universal Justice, first appearing in Ultraman Cosmos 2: The Blue Planet. Under direct orders from Delacion, Justice was accompanied by Cosmos into investigating a massive energy source. Their work led them into joining the Inter-Galactic Defense Force in their campaign against Leugocyte and Tartarus. He is voiced by Megumi Han in Japanese and Rumiko Varnes in English.
- Ultraman Nexus (ウルトラマンネクサス, Urutoraman Nekusasu): See here
- New Generation Hero (ニュージェネレーションヒーロー, Nyū Jenerēshon Hīrō): A team of Ultra Warriors starting from Ultraman Ginga to Ultraman Taiga. Their Medals were not part of the collections that Genegarg had stolen, thus Geed was able to use three of them to assume Galaxy Rising. After having his Geed Riser repaired, he gave the Medals to Haruki, in addition to his personal Medal. Aside from the aforementioned form, Geed (and later Z) could also utilize the Ginga, X and Orb Medals to execute the Galaxy Burst (ギャラクシーバースト, Gyarakushī Bāsuto) attack. At the time of The Absolute Conspiracy, some of its members went scattered to handle the Devil Splinter cases across the outer space, with available ones were conscripted into the Ultra League alliance to fight the threats unleashed by The Kingdom.
  - Ultraman Ginga (ウルトラマンギンガ, Urutoraman Ginga): His power inhabited the Ultraman Ginga Medal (ウルトラマンギンガメダル, Urutoraman Ginga Medaru).
  - Ultraman X (ウルトラマンエックス, Urutoraman Ekkusu): His power inhabited the Ultraman X Medal (ウルトラマンエックスメダル, Urutoraman Ekkusu Medaru).
  - Ultraman Orb (ウルトラマンオーブ, Urutoraman Ōbu): His power inhabited the Ultraman Orb Medal (ウルトラマンオーブメダル, Urutoraman Ōbu Medaru).
  - Ultrawoman Grigio and Tri-Squad: See above

== Supporting heroes ==
- Ultimate Force Zero (ウルティメイトフォースゼロ, Urutimeito Fōsu Zero): A group of giant heroes assembled by Zero at the time of Belial's reign in Another Space. The members are viewpoint characters in their namesake online novel, chronicling their exploits in events after Ultra Zero Fight and prior to Ultraman Geed.
  - Warrior of Flames Glenfire (炎の戦士 グレンファイヤー, Honō no Senshi Gurenfaiyā): A former member of the Pirates of Flames. In his guest appearance in episode 3 of Ultraman Z & Ultraman Zero Voice Drama, he was invited by Zero to give a brief talk over his team to Ultraman Z. During his spin-off novel, Glenfire encountered an ice creature whose role is to cultivate life on planets. He protected the creature from an enhanced Legionoid and parted ways after seeing the ice creature fulfill its deed. His voice role is reprised by Tomokazu Seki.
  - Jean-Nine (ジャンナイン, Jan Nain): The younger brother to Jean-Bot. In his guest appearance in episode 9 of Ultraman Z & Ultraman Zero Voice Drama, Jean-Nine visited the Land of Light under an errand to meet Zero, only to vent his anger on Z and his leader for the former's constant misnaming. His voice role is reprised by Miyu Irino (入野 自由, Irino Miyu).
  - Knight of Mirrors Mirror Knight (鏡の騎士 ミラーナイト, Kagami no Kishi Mirā Naito): A half Esmeraldian and a two-dimensional people. During his spin-off novel, Mirror Knight was sent to repair a crack from the infinity mirror after the events of Ultra Zero Fight, but his trauma from being poisoned by Belial and killed by Zero Darkness haunted him, until he overcame it with the help of a childhood friend. Together, the two unleashed a self-regeneration power onto the infinity mirror to heal itself despite the long process.
- Galaxy Rescue Force (ギャラクシーレスキューフォース, Gyarakushī Resukyū Fōsu): A peacekeeping universal-scale organization that protects life forms from all threats. Team members are consist of elites from various parts of the universe, including Ribut and Sora from the Land of Light. During Tartarus' campaign against the Land of Light, a few operatives joined Zero's Ultra League to prevent Yullian's kidnapping with little success.
  - Queen Izana (イザナ女王, Izana-joō; UGF: TAC): The queen of Planet Kanon, preceding Amate as the War Deity. She negotiated with Yullian and Sora prior to Leugocyte's attack on the planet. She is voiced by Kei Shindō (真堂 圭, Shindō Kei) and by Rumiko Varnes in the English dub.
  - Andro Melos (アンドロメロス, Andoro Merosu; UGF: TAC): An Andro People and a former leader of the Andro Defense Force, having resigned from his position when he started to become supplanted by younger members, including Andro Ares. When Zett launched his Zetton Army towards the Tri-Squad, Melos and Ribut joined the young Ultras in their fight and eventually participated in Zero's Ultra League to save Yullian from her kidnapping by Zett and Tartarus. He is voiced by Tomohiro Yamaguchi (山口 智広, Yamaguchi Tomohiro) in Japanese and by Jeff Manning in the English dub.
  - Lion Sacred Beast Gukuru Shisa (獅子聖獣 グクルシーサー, Shishi Sejū Gukuru Shīsā; UGF: TAC): First appeared in Ultraman Geed The Movie.

== Antagonists ==
=== Celebro ===
Parasitic Life Form Celebro (寄生生物 セレブロ, Kisei Seibutsu Sereburo) is an intelligent space parasite capable of possessing other creatures. On other planets, Celebro earn the reputation for stirring wars and bringing destruction to other civilizations all for the sake of his twisted Civilization Self-Destruction Game (文明自滅ゲーム, Bunmei Jimetsu Gēmu), simply by goading any civilization into creating their strongest weapon before he turned it against their creators. In Ja no Michi wa Hebi novel, Celebro gave Phalaris a seed of the Tree of Life that resulted with Sagittari's mutation into Grigio Raiden, who Celebro would use to destroy the capital of Imbat Federation before sending it to Earth where events of Ultraman Z would take place.

After using Genegarg to steal a Z Riser and the Ultra Medals, Celebro possessed the GAFJ's Monster Research Center officer Shinya Kaburagi as means of operating on Earth and orchestrated monster attacks from behind the scenes for his twisted enjoyment. After Metsuboros' death, Celebro was forced to take GAFJ police captain Asano as his new host when Kaburagi's body was rendered too injured to be used. During GAFJ's hostile takeover of STORAGE, Celebro jumped into Kuriyama to use the director's authority to disband STORAGE and approving both the D4 experimentation and Ultroid Zero's creation. With Juggler finally showing up to claim the Ultroid Zero, Celebro has the STORAGE members targeted under false pretenses for being aliens and jump into Yoko for possession to claim control of the Ultroid Zero, finally merging it with several Monster Medals and other Earth monsters into Destrudos. After Yoko purged Celebro from her body, the alien was forced to parasitize Destrudos on its own and was defeated by the sheer bond between Haruki and Z. Juggler halted the alien parasite's attempt in escape, where Yuka and Kaburagi captured him to be dissected for all the trouble he had caused on Earth.

In addition to his own Ultra Z Riser and a personalized Ultra Access Card, Celebro crafted his own Monster Medals (怪獣メダル, Kaijū Medaru) through reverse engineering from the Land of Light's Ultra Medals and monster samples from the Monster Research Center.

=== Grigio Raiden/Sagittari ===
Bombing Thunder Monster Grigio Raiden (爆撃雷獣 グルジオライデン, Bakugeki Raijū Gurujio Raiden; 12) is a monster who was originally a female alien sniper named Sagittari (サジタリ, Sajitari), a former special-forces member of the Interstellar Alliance.

In the novel Ja no Michi wa Hebi, Sagittari was an orphan came from a war-torn planet wherein she was raised into a child soldier and eventually gets hired by the Interstellar Alliance. Despite performing various missions for the Alliance, she and her troops were left to die by the same team after an internal conflict, with the Alliance eventually erasing records of her existence to cover up their mistake. Seeking revenge on the Alliance, she climbed the Warrior's Peak on Planet O-50 to obtain the power to transform into the monster Grigio (グルジオ, Gurujio) and eventually collaborating with arms dealer Phalaris. With the seed of the Tree of Life obtained, Sagittari was trapped in the Grigio form when it was permanently transformed into Grigio Raiden, modified and brainwashed by Phalaris into a rampaging cyborg monster. Raiden was originally manipulated by Phalaris to fight against Biranki's Gango, but with her master's death, the monster went on a rampaging spree in the capital of Imbat Federation.

Celebro later sent Raiden to Haruki's Earth while Juggler followed in-suit, intending to put her to sleep and giving her a mercy kill if necessary. In January 2010 (a decade prior to Ultraman Z), Grigio Raiden crash landed on Mount Fuji in Yamanashi Prefecture under Celebro's intent of pushing GAFJ into developing the SAA Units. In the present day, Grigio Raiden awakened and began consuming cars to replenish its energy. Fighting against the SAA units and Ultraman Z, she was killed by Yoko in King Joe STORAGE Custom when Haruki became hesitant due to the trauma of killing Red King. Grigio Raiden's main ability is to utilize electricity-based attacks, such as the Raiden Breathter (ライデンブレスター, Raiden Buresutā) breath attack and Raiden Destroy Cannon (ライデンデストロイキャノン, Raiden Desutoroi Kyanon) fired from its back cannon.

=== Ultroid Zero/Destrudos ===
SC-4 Ultroid Zero (特空機4号 ウルトロイドゼロ, Tokkū-ki Yon-gō Urutoroido Zero; 22-24) was the strongest robot weapon developed by GAFJ after STORAGE's disbandment, hence its development leader was Mai Yuki instead of Inaba. According to Yuka, the robot was declared as an abomination by the will of the Earth, which resulted with five monsters teaming up against Ultroid during its first test run. After Yoko used it in against three subterranean monsters, Juggler and Celebro try to fight for the robot's possession to further each other's agenda. Celebro possessed Yoko and claim the robot for his own to absorb all Monster Medals and other monsters to transform into Annihilation Armor Monster Destrudos (殲滅機甲獣 デストルドス, Senmetsu Kikō-jū Desutorudosu). In the fight against Ultraman Z, Destrudos defeated him with the D4 Ray and continues to attack major cities in the entire globe during Haruki's recuperation. After returning to Japan to confront STORAGE members, Destrudos fought against the three SAA Units before Haruki/King Joe STORAGE Custom punched his way through its cockpit to reclaim Yoko. Celebro was forced to take the cyborg monster as its final body in a last stand against Z and was destroyed by an enhanced Zestium Beam.

Ultroid Zero was built under the purpose of handling the D4 Ray, while incorporating combat data from the Ultra Warriors that STORAGE encountered and their King Joe STORAGE Custom, hence being declared as GAFJ's artificial Ultraman. Aside from D4, its weapons are Magnerium Gatlings (マグネリュームガトリング, Maguneryūmu Gatoringu), a pair of Magnerium Blades (マグネリュームブレード, Maguneryūmu Burēdo) on its forearms, Magnerium Shield (マグネリュームシールド, Maguneryūmu Shīrudo) energy barrier, Magnerium Slasher (マグネリュームスラッシャー, Maguneryūmu Surasshā) energy cutters and Magnerium Maser (マグネリュームメーザー, Maguneryūmu Mēzā) laser.

With the reclaimed Belial Medal, Celebro mutated Ultroid Zero into Destrudos by absorbing monsters under GAF's observations; Red King B, Dancan, Arstron, Birdon, Satan Beetle, Crescent and Majaba before he force injected the mecha with his entire possession of Monster Medals. The cyborg monster is piloted by a Celebro-possessed Yoko and is coated in a thick layer of metallic hide. Its attacks are Destrudo D4 Ray (デストルドD4レイ, Desutorudo Dī Fō Rei) from Majaba's face, Destrudo Breath (デストルドブレス, Desutorudo Buresu) energy beam and Destrudo Phalanx (デストルドファランクス, Desutorudo Farankusu) eye beams from Crescent's face, Destrudo Thunderblast (デストルドサンダーブラスト, Desutorudo Sandāburasuto) lightning bolt and Destrudo Hellfire (デストルドヘルファイヤ, Desutorudo Herufaiya) missiles from Dancan's spikes, and Destrudo Reaper (デストルドリーパー, Desutorudo Rīpā) from Birdon's wings. After Yoko expel Celebro's control, the alien possessed Destrudos and granted the monster the ability to regenerate from injuries.

=== Ultraman Belial ===
Ultraman Belial (ウルトラマンベリアル, Urutoraman Beriaru) was a dark Ultra Warrior who was killed in the conclusion of Ultraman Geed. In Ultraman Z, remnants of his essence, known as Devil Splinters (デビルスプリンター, Debiru Supurintā), became widespread in multiple dimensions, turning monsters into rampant while Celebro used them for his own ends. On Earth, the Celebro-possessed Kaburagi used Riku's Belial Factor and the Devil Splinter to forge an Ultraman Belial Medal (ウルトラマンベリアルメダル, Urutoraman Beriaru Medaru), allowing him to assume a Belial Fusion Monster to his liking. After giving the Medal to Haruki, Ultraman Z would gain access to Delta Rise Claw, a form which uses some of Belial's powers via the Ultraman Belial Atrocious Rise Medal (ウルトラマンベリアルアトロシアスライズメダル, Urutoraman Beriaru Atoroshiasu Raizu Medaru).

In The Absolute Conspiracy, Tartarus travel into the past during the events of Ultimate Wars where he influence a young Belial between the time of his banishment from the Land of Light and encountering Reiblood's spirit. He recruits Belial into The Kingdom with the promise to avert his impending death. Belial accepts and becomes a Parallel Isotope, a timeline variant of the prime Belial, remaining in his Early Style as his mutation into a Reionics never occurred while granted Absolute Particles to match the Absolutians in strength. Joined by a fellow Parallel Ultra, Tregear, the two assisted Tartarus in defeating the Ultra Brothers on Satellite Golgotha and securing Yullian's kidnapping by incapacitating the New Generation Heroes.

Ultraman Belial is voiced by Yūki Ono, reprising the role since Ultra Zero Fight. In the English dub of The Absolute Conspiracy, the Parallel Isotope Belial is voiced by Jack Merluzzi, who also voiced the original character during a split-second scene in Tartarus' flashback.

=== Absolute Tartarus ===
Ultimate Life Form Absolute Tartarus (究極生命体 アブソリュートタルタロス, Kyūkyoku Seimei-tai Abusoryūto Tarutarosu) is an Absolutian (アブソリューティアン, Abusoryūtian) that debuted in Ultra Galaxy Fight: The Absolute Conspiracy. Tartarus had been observing the Ultra Warriors since the Great Ultra War and is capable of traversing between different eras. His true agenda is to provide a new home, The Kingdom (ザ・キングダム, Za Kingudamu), for his race by taking the Land of Light and amasses his own personal army to do so.

His first plot was to evolve Maga-Orochi into Magatano-Orochi on Planet Mikarito by having Max infected with the Gudis Cells to accelerate the process. To fight against the Ultra Warriors, he also employ the help of Alien Sran, Hellberus, Leugocyte, Reibatos and Gymaira to his aid. While personally dealing against the Ultras, he was forced to back down when Cosmos and Justice fused into Legend and killed Sran for his incompetence. In addition to Alien Bat and Zett, Tartarus recruited more villains to his cause by tampering with the Land of Light's past to create Parallel Isotopes of the planet's past adversaries, recruiting Juda and Mold from the events of Andro Melos and Belial and Tregear before any of them would fall into the darkness. In the final chapter of The Absolute Conspiracy, Tartarus managed to kidnap Yullian and decided to use her as a bargaining chip for the Ultras to surrender the Land of Light to the Absolutians. He placed Yullian to be imprisoned alongside a mysterious figure.

Tartarus' main ability is to travel through time and tampering with the past by taking any villain he desired. Instead of a temporal paradox, this resulted in the creation of various alternate universes where each villains were extracted from their existence. He can also create a pocket dimension named Narak (ナラク, Naraku) as The Kingdom's base of operations and his finishing move is Absolute Destruction (アブソリュート・デストラクション, Abusoryūto Desutorakushon).

Absolute Tartarus is voiced by Junichi Suwabe (諏訪部 順一, Suwabe Jun'ichi). In the English dub, he is voiced by Walter Roberts.

=== Servants of The Kingdom ===
Exclusively to The Absolute Conspiracy, Tartarus amassed an army consisting of past adversaries from the Land of Light's history, having them swearing their allegiance to The Kingdom in his fight against the Ultra Warriors. He recruited them either through obtaining their Parallel Isotopes (並行同位体, Heikō Dōitai) from alternate universes or using Reibatos' ability to revive monsters from the dead.

Aliens and fallen Ultras

- High-Speed Alien Alien Sran (高速宇宙人 スラン星人, Kōsoku Uchūjin Suran Seijin; 1, 3): An alien who collaborated with Tartarus in both guarding the Maga-Orochi egg and administering Ultraman Max with the Gudis Cells (ゴーデス細胞, Gōdesu Saibō). He survived his defeat from Ultraman Great, but was killed by Tartarus for his incompetence. He is voiced by You Murakami (村上 ヨウ, Murakami Yō) and first appeared in episode 4 of Ultraman Max.
- Ghost Sorcerer Reibatos (亡霊魔道士 レイバトス, Bōrei Madō-shi Reibatosu; 2, 4, 7): The major antagonist of Ultra Fight Orb, a Reionics with the ability to resurrect deceased monsters into his servitude. Tartarus saved Reibatos from his death by intercepting at the last minute where Belial executed him. The necromancer had since served him to revive past villains such as Alien Bat from Ultraman Saga and Gymaira. He is voiced by Holly Kaneko (金子 はりい, Kaneko Harii).
- Ultraman Belial: See above.
- Ultraman Tregear (ウルトラマントレギア, Urutoraman Toregia): See here.
- Phantom Space Emperor Juda Spectre (幻影宇宙帝王 ジュダ・スペクター, Gen'ei Uchū Teiō Juda Supekutā; 4, 6): One of the commanders of Gua Army and is the youngest brother in his siblings. Although supposedly killed during the events of Ultra Fight Victory, Juda was conscripted into Tartarus' Parallel Isotopes by being dragged from the events of Andro Melos miniseries alongside Mold. The brothers fought against the 6 Ultra Brothers in Satellite Golgotha (衛星ゴルゴダ, Eisei Gorugoda) despite their intention to fight the Andro Defense Force in the present day. Both Juda and Mold were killed by Taro's Cosmo Miracle Beam when the latter combined with the rest of the Ultra Brothers. His voice role is reprised by Nobuaki Kanemitsu in Japanese.
- Phantom Space Great King Mold Spectre (幻影宇宙大王 モルド・スペクター, Gen'ei Uchū Daiō Morudo Supekutā; 4, 6): The eldest brother of the Gua Army's commander siblings, he was originally killed in episode 15 of Ultraman X by the combined forces of Ultraman Gingavictory and Exceed X. Tartarus recruited Mold and Juda by jumping into the past when he was still active during the events of Andro Melos, effectively making him a Parallel Isotope. The two brothers try to fight the original 6 Ultra Brothers on Satellite Golgotha in the present day, but were defeated by their combined Cosmo Miracle Beam, all while vowing that his sister Gina would avenge their deaths. He is voiced by Holly Kaneko in Japanese.
- Antenna Alien Alien Bat (触覚宇宙人 バット星人, Shokkaku Uchūjin Batto Seijin; 4, 7): Originally the main antagonist of Ultraman Saga, he was an alien who previously terrorized multiple planets for his own experimentations and was killed by Ultraman Saga in a fight that determined the fate of Planet Earth. He was revived by Reibatos to be conscripted into Tartarus' The Kingdom faction, where Bat complied by creating Zett. He is voiced by Munetoshi Takubo (田久保 宗稔, Takubo Munetoshi).
- Space Fear-Demon Zett (宇宙恐魔人 ゼット, Uchū Kyō Majin Zetto; 4, 7-10): A modified Zetton given the ability of self-awareness, he was created by Alien Bat to eliminate the Ultra Warriors. Zett harassed the Tri-Squad members with the Zetton army during their training in Planet Maijii. According to Taiga and Titas, the two had encountered a different Zett on Planet U40 prior to meeting Fuma and forming the Tri-Squad. After retreating from his fight with the Tri-Squad and the Galaxy Rescue Force members, Zett set his sight on kidnapping Yullian under Tartarus' orders by crashing her ship to Planet Ebil (惑星エビル, Wakusei Ebiru). He was killed by the combined efforts of Taiga Tri-Strium and Z's Zestium Beam. Zett is reprised by Tomokazu Sugita (杉田 智和, Sugita Tomokazu) from the Ultraman Festival 2016.

Monsters

- Evil Mega Lord Monster Gudis Maga-Orochi (邪悪大魔王獣 ゴーデスマガオロチ, Jaaku Dai Maō-jū Gōdesu Maga Orochi; 1-3): The main antagonist of Ultraman Orb. Originally sealed within the Monster Galaxy (モンスター銀河, Monsutā Ginga), it was unleashed into Planet Mikarito (惑星ミカリト, Wakusei Mikarito) to drain the planet of its nutrient. After infecting Max with the Gudis Cells, Alien Sran planned to provide the mutated Ultra as a food to Orochi for its evolution into Magatano-Orochi. Although Ribut managed to rescue Max, Orochi was hatched and empowered with the Gudis Cells as it was later on destroyed by Ribut, Max and Xenon. In Ultraman Z, a Maga-Orochi Medal (マガオロチメダル, Maga Orochi Medaru) was one of the many components used by Juggler to turn into Zeppandon.
- Ultimate Disaster Monster Hellberus (最凶獣 ヘルべロス, Saikyō-jū Heruberosu; 1, 3): A monster that guarded the Maga-Orochi egg, fighting against Max and Ribut during their investigation in Planet Mikarito. It was killed by Ultraman Powered's Mega Spacium Beam. First appeared in episode 1 of Ultraman Taiga.
- Cosmos Eater Leugocyte (コスモイーター ルーゴサイト, Kosumo Ītā Rūgosaito; 1-3): The final villain of Ultraman R/B, Leugocyte was dragged into The Kingdom through Tartarus' tampering with the timeline to target Planet Kanon and the Ultras Sora and Yullian, before 80's timely arrival. Afterwards, 80 led Neos and Seven 21 into fighting it on Planet Feed (惑星フィード, Wakusei Fīdo), as Cosmos and Justice join the fray for all five Ultras to destroy the monster together.
- Vampire Monster Gymaira (吸血怪獣 ギマイラ, Kyūketsu Kaijū Gimaira; 2): A monster that was resurrected by Reibatos in order to fight 80 while he was preoccupied in against Leugocyte. It was killed by 80's Shooting Beam. First appeared in episode 17 of Ultraman 80.
- Nightmare Monster Night Fang (悪夢魔獣 ナイトファング, Akumu Majū Naito Fangu; 5): A monster summoned by Tartarus into the past, prior of Tregear's self exile. While Tregear accompanied Taro in investigating the Planet Deastar (惑星デスター, Wakusei Desutā), Night Fang emerged from Tartarus' time portal to combat Taro and provoked its fear into the blue Ultra, allowing him to sway to Tartarus' compliance. Night Fang was destroyed by Taro's Ultra Dynamite, but the latter was too late to reach out to his friend. First appeared in episode 7 of Ultraman Taiga.
- Artificial Zetton Army (人工ゼットン軍団, Jinkō Zetton Gundan; 7-10): An army of Zettons that were artificially replicated by Alien Bat to serve as Zett's battalions. A smaller squadron were sent to fight the Tri-Squad on Planet Maijii and were destroyed after said team receiving assistance from the Galaxy Rescue Force. When 80 and Yullain were trapped in Planet Ebil, the Zetton Army try to keep them on bay until the arrival of the Ultra League destroyed them all. The team consists of:
  - Space Dinosaur Zetton (宇宙恐竜 ゼットン, Uchū Kyōryū Zetton): First appeared in episode 39 of Ultraman. In Ultraman Z, Zetton Medals (ゼットンメダル, Zetton Medaru) were each used by two different persons; one in Juggler's possession to form Zeppandon, while the other was manufactured by Celebro to form Pedanium Zetton.
  - Space Dinosaur EX Zetton (宇宙恐竜 EXゼットン, Uchū Kyōryū Ī Ekkusu Zetton): First appeared in Ultraman Mebius Side Story: Ghost Reverse.
  - Space Dinosaur Zetton Falx (宇宙恐竜 ゼットン・ファルクス, Uchū Kyōryū Zetton Farukusu): A Zetton with a pair of arm scythes. The suit was made from modifying Zetton Alien Baltan of Ultraman Festival 2016 and Hyper Zetton Deathscythe from Ultraman Orb.
  - Space Dinosaur Hyper Zetton (宇宙恐竜 ハイパーゼットン, Uchū Kyōryū Haipā Zetton): First appeared in Ultraman Saga.

== Other characters ==
- Vice minister (3): The vice minister of the Global Allied Forces American Headquarters who came to Japan for the budget meeting. After Gomora's defeat, by the vice minister's authority, STORAGE got the funds for the second SAA. He is portrayed by Robert Anderson (ロバート・アンダーソン, Robāto Andāson).
- Masaru Natsukawa (ナツカワ マサル, Natsukawa Masaru; 11, 14): Haruki's father and a firefighter, he died in Giestron's attack when his son was a child. Through Bullton's temporal warping powers, an adult Haruki reunited with his late father from the past and received a handful of advice to finally put his guilt from killing monsters to rest. He is portrayed by Norihito Kaneko (金児 憲史, Kaneko Norihito).
- Junko Natsukawa (ナツカワ ジュンコ, Natsukawa Junko; 11): Haruki's mother who lives in his hometown, Fukama City (深間市, Fukama-shi). She is portrayed by Sawa Masaki (正木 佐和, Masaki Sawa).
- Kaori (カオリ; 18): A young girl from the year 1966, she was among the past victims of Kemurs' kidnapping and was forcefully used as a human cover to slip into the society in the year 2020. She was rescued by Z Delta Rise Claw and Beliarok, splitting her from the alien while preventing her tormentor's plans. She is portrayed by Kaori Udagawa (宇田川 かをり, Udagawa Kaori).
- Ruri Inaba (イナバ ルリ, Inaba Ruri; 20): (Note: Her name is written in kanji as "稲葉 瑠璃", as seen in a news article on the tablet screen from episode 20.) Inaba's daughter and a biologist, she gained worldwide popularity by creating M1. After her creation was enlarged, Ruri collaborated with STORAGE to restore M1 to its original size and succeeded through her father. She is portrayed by Ami Hachiya (蜂谷 晏海, Hachiya Ami).
- Director Thomas (トーマス長官, Tōmasu-chōkan): The director of GAF Australia branch during STORAGE's visit in Fight! Sevenger chapter 4.

== Monsters and aliens ==
=== Ultraman Z ===
Devil Splinter victims

The Devil Splinter (デビルスプリンター, Debiru Supurintā) are fragments of Ultraman Belial that went scattered across the dimensions and sent the universe into a state of turmoil by manipulating monsters into berserk.

- Aquatic Hazardous Monster Majappa (水異怪獣 マジャッパ, Suii Kaijū Majappa; 2): First appeared in episode 9 of Ultraman Taiga.
- Great Space Monster Bemstar (宇宙大怪獣 ベムスター, Uchū Dai Kaijū Bemusutā; 2): First appeared in episode 18 of Return of Ultraman.
- Poison Flame Monster Segmeger (毒炎怪獣 セグメゲル, Dokuen Kaijū Segumegeru; 2): First appeared in episode 5 of Ultraman Taiga.
- Giant Artificial Brain Gillvalis (巨大人工頭脳 ギルバリス, Kyodai Jinkō Zunō Girubarisu; 6): A rogue AI and the main antagonist of Ultraman Geed The Movie. Originally destroyed by Geed Ultimate Final's Crescent Final Geed, the Devil Splinter resurrected it and fought Geed in Planet Ain, resulting in the destruction of his Geed Riser. After being destroyed by Ultraman Geed Galaxy Rising, the Core survived long enough to absorb silicons to repair itself, but STORAGE managed to lure it with a hoax information. The Devil Splinter used to resurrect him was salvaged by Celebro as part of the ingredients to create the Belial Medal.
  - Last Judgementer Gillvalis (Perfect Form) (ラストジャッジメンター ギルバリス (完全態), Rasuto Jajjimentā Girubarisu (Kanzen-tai); 6): Gillvalis' combat form. Due to the resurrection via Devil Splinter, it managed to overwhelm the Giga Finalizer and made its way to Earth being chased by Geed Galaxy Rising. Upon being cornered by STORAGE, this forced Gillvalis to transform into a battered Perfect Form, where Z and Geed deal the finishing blow while Windom/Yoko uploaded the Millennium Prize Problems mathematical questions that distract the Core from self-resurrection. Its remains were salvaged by the Monster Research Center and Celebro used a portion of them to create the Gillvalis Medal (ギルバリスメダル, Girubarisu Medaru).

Celebro-related

- Ferocious Space Shark Genegarg (凶暴宇宙鮫 ゲネガーグ, Kyōbō Uchū Zame Genegāgu; 1): A space monster that eats anything, Celebro possessed the monster as a medium to steal an Ultra Z Riser and a few Ultra Medals from the Land of Light while finding itself being chased from Z and Zero. After banishing Zero into Bullton's dimension, Genegarg made its way to Earth where it attacked the suburban area and the evacuation center (an elementary school). Upon fusing with Haruki, Z Alpha Edge destroyed Genegarg with Zestium Beam, causing the Ultra Medals to be scattered. However, Celebro managed to emerge unscathed and possessed Kaburagi instead. By itself, Genegarg is capable of firing Geneparasite Bomb (ゲネパラサイトボム, Geneparasaito Bomu) energy bullets and Genebuster (ゲネバスター, Genebasutā) energy beam from its mouth. Like real-life sharks, Genegarg can regurgitate the contents of its stomach through Genevomit (ゲネヴォミット, Genevomitto). In Ja no Michi wa Hebi, Genegarg was revealed to be the end result of a monster weapon created on a war-torn planet ready to be used by Celebro after possessing a government officer as a cover.
- Four-Dimensional Monster Bullton (四次元怪獣 ブルトン, Yojigen Kaijū Buruton; 1, 14): A meteorite monster that Genegarg (Celebro) used to expel Zero into an alternate dimension. On Earth, the Celebro-possessed Kaburagi managed to obtain its parts and summons Bullton to trap the entire STORAGE workers into the fourth dimension. It was killed by Ultraman Z after throwing the monster mid-air, but the resulting destruction undo the seal which held Greeza in the first place. First appeared in episode 17 of Ultraman.
- Subterranean Monster Telesdon (地底怪獣 テレスドン, Chitei Kaijū Teresudon; 4): As a result of the construction noise of an underground city in progress, Telesdon was awakened to attack said location. Despite Haruki's attempt in luring the monster away, Telesdon managed to destroy the site with its 2,000 degree flames. It resurfaced at some point later on in Kitabashi, Tokyo, where it faced against Z Beta Smash and Windom. Its beak is capable of using Super Oscillatory Wave (超振動波, Chō Shindō-ha) to dig its way in underground area. First appeared in episode 22 of Ultraman.
  - Enhanced Subterranean Monster Erimaki-Telesdon (強化地底怪獣 エリマキテレスドン, Kyōka Chitei Kaijū Erimaki Teresudon; 4): To test the ability of a Monster Medal, Celebro fed the Jirahs Medal to Telesdon, which resulted in gaining a frill similar to said monster. After Windom removed its frill, Z Alpha Edge fired Zestium Beam to destroy it. The Jirahs Medal was initially salvaged and dissipated in Haruki's possession. Using Jirahs' frills, Telesdon is capable of performing Depth Destruction Heat Ray Wave (デプス破壊熱線波, Depusu Hakai Nessen-ha) beam, Depth Reflective Cannon (デプス反射砲, Depusu Hansha-hō) as protection and Depth Splitting Heat Ray Wave (デプス拡散熱線波, Depusu Kakusan Nessen-ha) energy bullets.
- Android Troop Valis Raiders (アンドロイド兵 バリスレイダー, Andoroido Hei Barisu Reidā; 6-8): Gillvalis' squadron of robots from Ultraman Geed The Movie. Using leftover parts from the AI's Perfect Form, Celebro rebuild them as his personal soldiers and readily summoned through a handheld gun. Several of the troops were used to kidnap Riku for Celebro to extract his DNA and create Belial Medal, the last of these androids were destroyed by Juggler during his infiltration in Monster Research Center to intercept Celebro. At some point of time, the gun used to summon the android was harvested into Galactron MK2 Medal (ギャラクトロンMK2メダル, Gyarakutoron Māku Tsū Medaru), allowing Celebro to mutate Horoboros into Metsuboros alongside the Gillvalis Medal.
- Belial Fusion Monster (ベリアル融合獣, Beriaru Yūgō-jū): Fusions of two different monsters with Belial's power from Ultraman Geed. With the Ultraman Belial Medal harvested through Riku's Belial DNA, Celebro transforms into all three of them with his Z Riser in the same way as Kei Fukuide from his active period to fight Z, Geed and Zero.
  - Skull Gomora (スカルゴモラ, Sukaru Gomora; 7): Transformed through Gomora and Red King Medals. First appeared in episode 1 of Ultraman Geed.
  - Thunder Killer (サンダーキラー, Sandā Kirā; 7): Transformed through Eleking and Ace Killer Medals. First appeared in episode 4 of Ultraman Geed.
  - Pedanium Zetton (ペダニウムゼットン, Pedaniumu Zetton; 7): Transformed through King Joe and Zetton Medals. First appeared in episode 11 of Ultraman Geed.
- Combined Monster Tri-King (合体怪獣 トライキング, Gattai Kaijū Torai Kingu; 8, 15, 22): A combination of Golza, Melba and Super C.O.V. using their medals. Celebro first transforms to test the fusion's capability against Sevenger and Windom. When Jugger obtained the Fike King medal sets, he assumed Tri-King first to assist Z and Geed in fighting against Greeza.
  - Super Combined Monster Five King (超合体怪獣 ファイブキング, Chō Gattai Kaijū Faibu Kingu; 8, 15, 22, 24): The upgraded form of Tri-King once scanning Reicubas and Gan-Q Medals, first appeared in episode 7 of Ultraman Ginga S. After overpowering Ultraman Z Beta Smash, Juggler turn the tables by providing the Ultra with Medals that provide access to Gamma Future. Using his new form, Z freezes Five King before he dive into the monster and destroy it from within. Celebro would lose the Medals after being ambushed by Juggler in the Monster Research Center, the latter would use Five King in a futile attempt to fight Greeza. After Juggler's defeat by Gamma Future, Celebro reclaimed Five King's Medals to transform into the colossal monster and fight Juggler and Z over the Ultroid Zero's ownership. After the battle, all five Medals were among those assimilated with Ultroid Zero into Destrudos.
- Transforming Phantom Alien Pitt "Fa" and "Si" (変身怪人 ピット星人 ファ シィ, Henshin Kaijin Pitto Seijin Fa Syi; 8): A pair of Alien Pitt sisters tasked by Celebro to gather the essences of Golza, Melba and Super C.O.V. before brainwashing them to gather the meteorite essence of Reicubas and Gan-Q. The sisters also kidnapped Yoko and Yuka after mistaking the two as Z's human host. They are portrayed by Kanon Miyahara (宮原 華音, Miyahara Kanon) and Shioka Ishizuka (石塚 汐花, Ishizuka Shioka) respectively. The race first appeared in episode 3 of Ultraseven.
- Wild Fierce Monster Horoboros (豪烈暴獣 ホロボロス, Gōretsu Bō-jū Horoborosu; 16): An ancient monster in Shishigaoka that surfaced once in every 333 years when the sun faces a sunspot phenomenon. At four years old, the young Yuka gained her inspiration in researching monsters after she got lost at night and wandering in Horoboros' forbidden area. In the present day, Horoboros resurfaced and Yuka managed to use a conch shell's music to soothe the monster. Despite its intention to return to rest, Celebro transformed it into Metsuboros. From its own body, Horoboros can unleash volts of electricity, called Gicante Thunder (ギカンテサンダー, Gikante Sandā) to every direction. First appeared in episode 10 of Ultraman R/B.
  - Parasitic Devastation Monster Metsuboros (寄生破滅獣 メツボロス, Kisei Hametsu-jū Metsuborosu; 16): In order to regain his Belial Medal, Celebro transformed Horoboros into a cyborg by injecting it with Galactron MK2 and Gillvalis' Medals. In addition to Galactron MK2's visor and Gillvalis' mechanical claws, Metsuboros can charge and shoot the Charged Particle Cannon (荷電粒子砲, Kaden Ryūshi-hō) from its mouth, but the transformation is entirely painful for the monster to bear. Under Yuka's wish, Z gave Horoboros a mercy kill via Deathcium Slash as it passes on to afterlife. The mechanical left claw that was left behind was salvaged by Barossa II as part of his collection of weapons.

Others

- Ancient Monster Gomess (古代怪獣 ゴメス, Kodai Kaijū Gomesu): First appeared in episode 1 of Ultra Q.
  - 1: An 18-meter-tall (59 ft) monster appearing in Chōfu, Tokyo. Despite Yoko's precautions to evade collateral damages, Gomess chased Haruki after his attempt to rescue a stray dog. This led to her frantically throwing Gomess to Chofu City Cultural Hall Tazukuri and eventually for her/Sevenger to destroy the entire hall.
  - 23: A 50-meter variant of Gomess was one of the five monsters that awakened to destroy Ultroid Zero due to harbouring the D4 Ray. It emerged from Mount Kuzuha alongside Demaaga and Pagos to fight said robot and was joined by Takkong and King Guesra when Ultraman Z joined the fray. It was among the three monsters to be killed by the D4 Ray.
- Transparent Monster Neronga (透明怪獣 ネロンガ, Tōmei Kaijū Neronga; 2): One of the many monsters to be awakened on Earth as a result of Genegarg's destruction. It has the ability to turn invisible and even disguising its body heat to match with the surroundings. Neronga was able to defeat Haruki in Sevenger by siphoning its battery reserves. While targeting a recently opened energy plant, Yuka tagged the monster with a marker and Z interfered to save Yoko in Sevenger. Using Hebikura's training on Haruki, the Ultra turn the tables and defeated the monster with Zestium Beam. Yuka managed to salvage a piece of its horn and used it to accelerate Windom's charging process. First appeared in episode 3 of Ultraman.
- Freezing Monster Guigass (冷凍怪獣 ギガス, Reitō Kaijū Gigasu; 3): A monster that appeared at Izuhara Highlands (伊豆原高原, Izuhara Kōgen), Haruki defeated it with Sevenger's new rocket fist attack while inadvertently destroying an observatory in the process. First appeared in episode 25 of Ultraman. Guigass' fight against Sevenger would later be the inspiration of Sevenger Fight miniseries.
- Ancient Monster Gomora (古代怪獣 ゴモラ, Kodai Kaijū Gomora; 3): A hibernating monster discovered by construction workers at Mount Goko (五甲山, Gokō-san). STORAGE was ordered to relocate it to an uninhabited island while being observed by representatives from Global Allied Forces American Headquarters. While in mid-delivery, Gomora awakened due to hay fever and instantly provoked into almost attacking the GAF's meeting area. With Sevenger passed its time limit, Haruki transformed into Z, assuming Beta Smash for the first time and blowing Gomora to pieces with Zestium Upper. Its essence would later be turned into Gomora Medal (ゴモラメダル, Gomora Medaru) in Celebro's possession. First appeared in episode 26 of Ultraman.
- Freezing Monster Peguila (冷凍怪獣 ペギラ, Reitō Kaijū Pegira; 5): An ancient monster sealed in Alaska by the Z Lance Arrow. When the weapon was removed, this unintentionally freed Peguila to attack the same research lab that studied the artifact. Yoko was frozen in Windom and this forced Haruki to board Sevenger unauthorized to save her when his Z Riser was briefly stolen by Juggler. Ultraman Z would obtain the weapon and defeated Peguila with Z Lance Fire. First appeared in episode 5 of Ultra Q.
- Alien Pegassa "Pega" (ぺガッサ星人 ぺガ, Pegassa Seijin Pega; 6, 7): Riku Asakura's alien friend from Nebula House, accompanying him in the search of Belial's Devil Splinter across the universe. Under Hikari's orders, Pega delivered the Z Riser to replace Riku's damaged Geed Riser. Pega and the Nebula House tracked Riku to Haruki's Earth and the two friends reunite to hunt the Devil Splinters in space. His voice role is reprised by Megumi Han.
- Space Pirate Alien Barossa (海賊宇宙人 バロッサ星人, Kaizoku Uchūjin Barossa Seijin): A race of pirates born in a clutches of 10,000. They made their reputation by stealing weapons from their defeated opponents. Prior to the series, Ultraman Zero encountered a Barossa that fought using trickery. The Barossas are designed by Kengo Kusunoki as an alien that will represent the Reiwa era of Japan.
  - 9, 10: The eldest brother of a Barossa clutch aimed for the Ultra Medals on Earth as his space treasure. Since he lacks a vocal cord to properly speak, he required a hypnotized victim as an interpreter. Using a hijacked King Joe, he managed to stole three of them from Monster Research Center and forced STORAGE to surrender the other three Medals in their possession. After surviving King Joe's defeat, Barossa breached into STORAGE headquarters to reclaim the robot but found itself fighting against STORAGE members. Through Dada's Micronizer Gun, he enlarged himself and fights Z with an array of stolen weapons. Although defeated by the Ultra's new attack, the slain Barossa claimed that his other 9,999 siblings shall avenge him. He is voiced by Kōichi Toshima (外島 孝一, Toshima Kōichi).
  - II (二代目, Ni-daime; 16, 17): A second Barossa descended to Earth after Metsuboros' destruction, aiming for Ultraman Z's Beliarok and avenging his older brother. His quest led to a three way conflict when Juggler joins in for the sentient sword. After enlarging himself again through Juran seeds, Barossa II attempted to use Yoko/Windom as a hostage, but the Beliarok choose Z as his wielder again and finished the second Barossa with Deathcium Fang. He is voiced by Tomokazu Seki.
  - III (三代目, San-daime; 22): The third Barossa is the older brother to the previous Barossa II, intending to avenge his other two brothers by personally dealing with Haruki three days after STORAGE's disbandment. He wielded Gorothunder's Goron Bō club weapon and enlarges by drinking bubble tea. While dealing against Z (who at that time was occupied by Five King/Juggler), he was killed when Sevenger/Yoko rode on top of the Leg Carrier and sliced by the Beliarok. He is voiced by Tatsuya Hashimoto (橋本 達也, Hashimoto Tatsuya).
- Space Robot King Joe (宇宙ロボット キングジョー, Uchū Robotto Kingu Jō; 9, 10): The Alien Barossa's mecha robot and transportation, it was originally belonged to a defeated Alien Pedan (ペダン星人, Pedan Seijin) before the space pirate used it in his quest to steal the Ultra Medals on Earth. The pursuit of the other trio Medals consist of Cosmos, Nexus and Mebius created a three-way conflict between STORAGE, Barossa and Celebro. Z managed to obtain them and initiated Lightning Generade to strike the separated mecha's weak points (its connection joints). The robot was afterward salvaged by STORAGE members while Barossa made it out safely. While attempting to breach into the STORAGE headquarters, Barossa attempted to reactivate the robot, but was thwarted by STORAGE members. The technology from King Joe was reverse engineered into King Joe STORAGE Custom as STORAGE's third SAA unit. Prior to its appearance, a King Joe Medal (キングジョーメダル, Kingu Jō Medaru) was obtained by Celebro as one of the components for Pedanium Zetton. First appeared in episode 14 of Ultraseven.
- Skull Monster Red King (どくろ怪獣 レッドキング, Dokuro Kaijū Reddo Kingu; 11, 24): A pair of parent monsters trying to defend their egg. The male Red King was killed by Z, but the female was spared from its death after discovering the egg it protected. The female Red King and its egg disappeared into the Fukama City's mountainous area, where Ultroid Zero approached it as the final monster to be absorbed to form Destrudos. Her unhatched egg was protected by Ultraman Z and relocated away from his fight with Destrudos. Prior to their appearance, a Red King Medal (レッドキングメダル, Reddo Kingu Medaru) was obtained by Celebro as one of the components for Skull Gomora. First appeared in episode 8 of Ultraman.
- Ferocious Monster Giestron (凶猛怪獣 ギーストロン, Kyōmō Kaijū Gīsutoron; 11): A monster that appeared at a campsite in the past. Young Haruki and his parents got caught up in Giestron's attack, which killed his father. First appeared in the Ultraman Festival 2019.
- Coin Monster Kanegon (コイン怪獣 カネゴン, Koin Kaijū Kanegon; 13): A human-sized monster who strive on coins in order to survive. Finding itself within STORAGE base, Kanegon ate Haruki's Ultra Medals out of pure hunger, forcing the officer in patrol spending the rest of his duty trying to force them out. After all of the Medals were regurgitated, Kanegon left the base. He is voiced by Misato Fukuen (福圓 美里, Fukuen Misato) and first appeared in episode 15 of Ultra Q.
- Void Monster Greeza (虚空怪獣 グリーザ, Kokū Kaijū Gurīza; 15): A monster who served as the final villain of Ultraman X, originally a living anomaly sealed by Bullton during the creation of the universe. Greeza came to being as a result of Bullton's destruction, and proceed to absorb various objects as it slowly consuming the Earth. Geed allowed himself to be absorbed in order to find the space needle needed to destroy Greeza, but doing so gets him assimilated and briefly halting the monster's movements. By obtaining the Beliarok, Z Delta Rise Claw uses Deathcium Slash to destroy it. While assimilating Geed, Greeza briefly gains the ability to fire the Ultra's Wrecking Burst.
- Underground Monster Pagos (地底怪獣 パゴス, Chitei Kaijū Pagosu): First appeared in episode 18 of Ultra Q.
  - 18: A monster surfaced from the Kirimoto City (桐元市, Kirimoto-shi), due to being attracted to Kemur's magnetic waves. Its kidnapping was to ensure the success of Kemur's plans. After Kemur's death, Pagos was among the returned victims and was last seen burrowing itself back into underground.
  - 23: Another Pagos surfaced in Mount Kuzuha to join Demaaga and Gomess in fighting against Ultroid Zero due to the presence of the D4 energy substance. It was killed by the D4 Ray alongside its two other subterranean monsters.
- Abduction Phantom Kemur (誘拐怪人ケムール人, Yūkai Kaijin Kemūru Jin; 18): A race of aliens who kidnap humans in order solve their aging problems. They originally carry out this operation back in 1966, wherein an operative was thwarted by the efforts of civilians working together with the police forces. Another operative was fused to Kaori, one of the abducted humans from 1966 and he uses her to mask their mass-kidnapping on Earth. However, because of Kaori's dedication to Earth, she constantly wrestles with the Kemur over the control of their bodies. Kemur's endgame was to disperse his Erasing Energy Source (消去エネルギー源, Shōkyo Enerugī-gen) with a bomb and teleports the entire citizens of Kirimoto City. Using Beliarok, Z severed Kaori from Kemur, killing the alien and safely disposing the bomb in a pocket dimension. He is voiced by Takanori Tsujimoto (辻本 貴則, Tsujimoto Takanori) and first appeared in episode 19 of Ultra Q.
- Great Space Monster Bemstar (19): A space monster that devoured several of Global Allied Forces' spy satellites. Bemstar returned two years later to devour gas tanks as food sources, but in the middle of fighting the SAA Units, it fled after witnessing Yapool's dimension crack.
- Hitman Terrible-Monster Baraba (殺し屋超獣バラバ, Koroshiya Chōjū Baraba; 19): One of the many Terrible-Monsters sent by Yapool to invade Earth during Ultraman Ace's active era. As Yapool had long dead, their spiritual grudge against Ultraman Ace gave birth to a sentient version of Baraba. It targeted Windom because of its resemblance to Ace and fought against Z using its variety of attacks. Ace appeared to join Z in the battle and the two combine their techniques into Space Z to destroy the Terrible-Monster. What remained of Baraba was the head blade that contain essences of Yapool's extra-dimensional energy, allowing GAFJ to weaponize said energy into the D4 Ray. In addition to its old set of attacks, Baraba is capable of utilizing Verokron's missiles and Jumboking's eye beams. Baraba is voiced by Holly Kaneko and first appeared in episode 13 of Ultraman Ace.
- Artificial Life Form M1 (人工生命 M1号, Jinkō Seimei Emu Ichi-gō; 20): An artificial life form created by Ruri Inaba, whose body cells became beneficial in the medical field. While being kidnapped by a terrorist organization, M1 grew into monstrous size after being knocked into a generator box. Despite GAFJ's orders to have it killed, STORAGE collaborated with Ruri to distract M1 away from a populated area. While M1 was restrained by the Beliarok's Deathcium Claw, Inaba shot the shrink serum through King Joe STORAGE Custom and returned M1 to its true size. First appeared in episode 10 of Ultra Q.
- Brutal Space Monster Kelbim (宇宙凶険怪獣 ケルビム, Uchū Kyōken Kaijū Kerubimu; 21): A species of space monsters that attack planets in order to drain them of its strong energy supply. Due to GAFJ's experimentation with Yapool's extra-dimensional energy to create the D4 superweapon in Ganges Island, Kelbim appeared on Earth and set its sight on King Joe STORAGE Custom, the current holder of said weapon. The Mother Kelbim kept sending its eggs and hatched, cornering Yoko/King Joe STORAGE Custom when Z was off-planet to fight their parent. Out of weaponries left, Yoko used the D4 Ray to destroy the remaining Kelbims. First appeared in episode 4 of Ultraman Mebius.
  - Brutal Space Monster Mother Kelbim (宇宙凶険怪獣 マザーケルビム, Uchū Kyōken Kaijū Mazā Kerubimu; 21): The parent of the Kelbims on Earth, standing at the height of 303 meters. Due to the presence of D4 Ray on Earth, she sent her children through asteroid eggs to secure Windom and continuously hatching more of her children while taking refuge in a space debris. Using Delta Rise Claw, Z killed her with the Beliarok's Deathcium Slash.
- Oil Monster Takkong (オイル怪獣 タッコング, Oiru Kaijū Takkongu; 23): An aquatic monster who surfaced from the Tsuruga Bay alongside King Guesra in response to the D4 energy substance in Ultroid Zero. The two monsters fought Ultraman Z and reached Mount Kuzuha to join Demaaga, Pagos and Gomess in the fray. Takkong was defeated by the Beliarok's Deathcium Fang and returned to the sea alongside King Guesra. First appeared in episode 1 of Return of Ultraman.
- Sea Monster King Guesra (海獣 キングゲスラ, Kaijū Kingu Gesura; 23): An aquatic monster that accompanied Takking in its quest from Tsuruga Bay to Mount Kuzuha to fight Ultroid Zero. King Guesra was defeated by the Beliarok's Deathcium Claw, but survived the entire fight and left alongside Takkong before the D4 Ray decimated the rest of the monsters. Prior to its appearance, a Guesra was one of the many monsters to be awakened by Genegarg's presence on Earth. First appeared in Superior Ultraman 8 Brothers.
- Molten Iron Monster Demaaga (熔鉄怪獣 デマーガ, Yōtetsu Kaijū Demāga; 23): One of the many monsters to appear in Mount Kuzuha to destroy Ultroid Zero due to its presence of D4 energy substance. Alongside its subterranean brethren, it was decimated by the D4 Ray. First appeared in episode 1 of Ultraman X.

=== Ultra Galaxy Fight: The Absolute Conspiracy ===
- Three-Faced Phantom Dada (三面怪人 ダダ, Sanmen Kaijin Dada; 4): One of the many combatants of the Great Ultra War, fighting alongside Godola, Babarue and Nackle in against Ken and Belial. He was killed by Belial in the Director's Cut version. First appearing in episode 28 of Ultraman.
- Anti-Gravity Alien Alien Godola (反重力宇宙人 ゴドラ星人, Han Jūryoku Uchūjin Godora Seijin; 4): One of Empera's soldiers, he was killed by Ultraman Belial. First appeared in episode 4 of Ultraseven.
- Assassin Alien Alien Nackle (暗殺宇宙人 ナックル星人, Ansatsu Uchūjin Nakkuru Seijin; 4): One of Empera's soldiers, he was ordered alongside Babarue to act as diversions for Ken and Belial while the dark ruler lay waste on the Land of Light. Despite Nackle's plea for mercy reached Ken, Belial slaughtered him out of spite. He is voiced by Tetsuo Kishi (岸 哲生, Kishi Tetsuo) and first appeared in episode 37 of Return of Ultraman.
- Dark Alien Alien Babarue (暗黒星人 ババルウ星人, Ankoku Seijin Babarū Seijin; 4): One of Empera's soldiers, acting as diversions for Ken and Belial alongside Nackle. He was killed by Belial when Nackle's plea for mercy went ignored. First appeared in episode 38 of Ultraman Leo.
- Dark Space Great Emperor Alien Empera (暗黒宇宙大皇帝 エンペラ星人, Ankoku Uchū Dai-kōtei Enpera Seijin; 4): The main antagonist of Ultraman Mebius and is also the instigator of the Great Ultra War (ウルトラ大戦争, Urutora Dai Sensō) by leading his monster army in against the Land of Light inhabitants, clashing against both the younger Father of Ultra and Ultraman Belial. During his invasion on the Land of Light, Empera slew a group of Ultras and managed to defeat Ken and Belial. When Marie presented Ken with the Ultimate Blade, the two warriors went into a swordsfight and delivered matching scars on each other's right waist. The Empera disappeared after that, but his presence lay impact on Belial and became one of the factors of his eventual downfall. In the Japanese dub, he is voiced by Tomokazu Seki, who also voiced Ultraman Great in a dual role for The Absolute Conspiracy.
- Spoiled Child Monster Zandrias (だだっ子怪獣 ザンドリアス, Dadakko Kaijū Zandoriasu; 7): A young monster partnering with Noiseler to fight Grigio on Ayaka City. The pair left the Earth after Grigio scared them with Grigio Shoot. First appeared in episode 4 of Ultraman 80.
- Noise Monster Noiseler (騒音怪獣 ノイズラー, Sō'on Kaijū Noizurā; 7): A bat-themed space monster that partnered with Zandrias in terrorizing the outskirts of Ayaka City. First appeared in episode 7 of Ultraman 80.

=== Fight! Sevenger ===
- Robot Monster Crazygon (ロボット怪獣 クレージーゴン, Robotto Kaijū Kurējīgon; 1): An alien robot that fought Sevenger in the day before Ultraman Z's arrival. Sent by Alien Banda, Crazygon was intercepted in its theft of cars by Haruki/Sevenger, who uses Inaba's boxing skills to save the drivers and destroy the robot's door. He would later destroy Crazygon with Sevenger's headbutt attack. First appeared in episode 38 of Ultraseven.
- Deep Sea Dragon Deeplus (深海竜 ディプラス, Shinkai Ryū Dipurasu; 2): A sea monster that attacked various delivery ships. A customized Sevenger shoot Deeplus with a harpoon and made use of its faulty jetpack to drag the monster to the surface, simultaneously killing it. First appeared in episode 23 of Ultraman Dyna.
- Mountain God Monster Jirangon (山神怪獣 ジランゴン, Yamagami Kaijū Jirangon; 3): A monster that originated from the Kamakura period. It was originally sealed in Mount Jirao (爾来尾山, Jirao-san) after a sumo fight, next to a local shrine and had since revered by the nearby villagers. Jirangon was unsealed from Mount Jirao due to prolonged heavy rain in Gunma Prefecture, wherein Sevenger intercepted the monster before it could progress to the urban areas. Using Jirangon's own legend in the past, Haruki/Sevenger challenged the monster into a sumo match and was sealed again in Mount Jirao.
- Insect Monster Majaba (昆虫怪獣 マジャバ, Konchū Kaijū Majaba; 4): A grasshopper-like monster that appeared during STORAGE's visit to GAF Australia branch, with Yoko already dispatched in Sevenger and uses a giant hand fan to kill Majaba in a single hit. In Ultraman Z, another Majaba in Australia was absorbed by Ultroid Zero as part of the components required to form Destrudos. First appeared in episode 8 of Ultraman: Towards the Future.
- Cloud Monster Red Smogy (雲怪獣 レッドスモーギ, Kumo Kaijū Reddo Sumōgi; 5, 7, 8): Originally a sentient cloud of red gas coming from outer space, it transformed into a monster after being affected by the rain in an urban area. Red Smogy was reverted to its cloud form when Haruki used the robot's jetpack in a similar manner to a dryer, while Yuka was sent by Hebikura to gather the red gas specimen for a research collaboration with the Monster Research Center. During Vortech Fire's reign of terror, STORAGE brought in a restrained Red Smogy to be used as a distraction, tossing it towards the former monster before Haruki/Sevenger delivers his final blow. First appeared in episode 4 of The Ultraman.
- Marine Animal Samekujira (海獣 サメクジラ, Kaijū Samekujira; SP): A shark/whale monster that attacked several ships at some point after Garamon's invasion. Inaba took it to himself to sortie with Sevenger, using its Drill Fist to counter the monster's nose blade weapon. First appeared in episode 53 of Ultraman Taro.
- Marathon Monster Idatenran (マラソン怪獣 イダテンラン, Marason Kaijū Idatenran; 6, 8): A monster that STORAGE pursued to prevent him from destroying a nearby dam in his running track. Under Inaba's advice, Haruki/Sevenger performed a suplex and slams the monster's head to the ground, transforming him into the form of a teenager. In the midst of STORAGE's campaign against Vortech Fire, Yoko/SAA 2 Prototype Machine took advantage of Idatenran into a relay race to deliver Red Smogy to Haruki/Sevenger. First appeared in episode 48 of Ultraman 80.
- Exploding Flame Monster Vortech Fire (爆烈炎怪獣 ボルテックファイヤー, Bakuretsu Honō Kaijū Borutekku Faiyā; 7, 8): A monster which was designed under the winner of Televi-Kun's designing contest. Appearing in Matsudōri City (松通市, Matsudōri-shi), Chiba Prefecture, Vortech Fire fought against Sevenger with the use of its elemental powers; fire, grass, and sand, as well as merging them to execute Rising Sun Big Exploding Wave (日ノ丸爆大波, Hinomaru Bakudai-ha) finisher. Due to its enormous power STORAGE deployed a restrained Red Smogy for Yoko SAA 2 Prototype Machine and Idatenran to deliver as Haruki/Sevenger toss the monster into a distraction, allowing him to deliver a headbutt attack to end Vortech Fire's reign of terror.
- Rock Monster Gakuma (岩石怪獣 ガクマ, Ganseki Kaijū Gakuma; 9): A pair of monsters that awakened due to a construction activity in Mount Kurara (久良々山, Kurara-yama). Both monsters were defeated by STORAGE after luring them away from the mountains. First appeared in episode 2 of Ultraman Tiga.
  - Gakuma (Alpha) (ガクマ（α）, Gakuma (Arufa)): The single horned monster and the first to be awakened. Yoko and Yuka proceed to lure it away from the construction site until it was joined by Gakuma (Beta), where Haruki/Sevenger took advantage of the situation by tricking both monsters to ram against the other, leaving Gakuma (Alpha) as the first to be incapacitated.
  - Gakuma (Beta) (ガクマ（β）, Gakuma (Bēta)): The second Gakuma to be awakened, joining Alpha in their chase against Yoko and Yuka. After accidentally incapacitated against its partner, Beta was killed after Haruki/Sevenger used the jetpack's boosters for a boosted headbutt attack.
- Heinous Two-Sided Monster Ashuran (二面凶悪怪獣 アシュラン, Nimen Kyōaku Kaijū Ashuran; 10, 11): A space monster that appeared in Sakikawa City (崎川市, Sakikawa-shi). After initially incapacitating Yoko with a mouth gag, Ashuran was later forced to fight another Sevenger that was sent by Ultraseven as Yoko/SAA 1 Sevenger join the fight shortly after. Through Yuka's advice, the Sevengers proceed to attack Ashuran on both sides of its faces that resulted with the monster's own destruction. First appeared in episode 34 of Ultraman Leo.
- Monster Ball Sevenger (怪獣ボール セブンガー, Kaijū Bōru Sebungā; 11): A robot monster that was once used by Ultraseven from episode 34 of Ultraman Leo. When Yoko/SAA 1 Sevenger was incapacitated, Seven gave Haruki the Monster Ball to summon his Sevenger. With Juggler freeing Yoko from captivity, both Sevengers join the fight and proceed to defeat Ashuran after punching the monster on both sides. After the battle ended, Seven's Sevenger disappeared from the scene.

=== Sevenger Fight ===
- Frilled Monster Jirahs (エリ巻き怪獣 ジラース, Erimaki Kaijū Jirāsu; 1): A monster that Sevenger fought at some point prior to Ultraman Z. In the series proper, Celebro harvest its remains into Jirahs Medal (ジラースメダル, Jirāsu Medaru) to empower Telesdon into Erimaki Telesdon. First appeared in episode 10 of Ultraman.
- Anti-Chaos Header Extermination Weapon Alt-Hellzking (対カオスヘッダー殲滅兵器 ヘルズキング改, Tai Kaosu Heddā Senmetsu Heiki Heruzukingu Kai; 2): A space robot which the GAF America defeated and detained into the Integrated Advanced Equipment Laboratory (統合先進装備研究所, Tōgō Senshin Sōbi Kenkyūjo) prior to the events of Ultraman Z. Although modified into its current form to serve GAF America, Alt-Hellzking escaped and went out of control, forcing Sevenger to fight against it. First appeared in episode 61 of Ultraman Cosmos.
- Space Monster Eleking (宇宙怪獣 エレキング, Uchū Kaijū Erekingu; 3, 6): A space monster belonging to Alien Pitts "Fa" and "Si" that was accidentally left behind at some point after being freed from Celebro's mind control. Eleking fought against Sevenger and was killed after accidentally firing the robot's rifle to itself. During Space Sevenger's crash landing to an alien planet, another Eleking was one of the natives of that planet. It fought against Gazort II after the latter accidentally stepping onto its tail and was killed by Space Sevenger when it accidentally joined the fray. In Ultraman Z, Celebro harvested Eleking's remains to create the Eleking Medal (エレキングメダル, Erekingu Medaru) and transform into Thunder Killer. First appeared in episode 3 of Ultraseven.
- Foaming Monster Dancan (発泡怪獣 ダンカン, Happō Kaijū Dankan; 4): A space monster that was originally under containment, until it escaped with a missile in its mouth. Haruki in Sevenger was dispatched to reclaim the stolen missile and finally calming it down before its battery supply ended. In Ultraman Z, Dancan was detained in China and was among the monsters to be absorbed by Ultroid Zero to transform into Destrudos. First appeared in episode 34 of Ultraseven.
- Meteorite Monster Garamon (隕石怪獣 ガラモン, Inseki Kaijū Garamon; 5, 7): A pair of meteorite monsters sent as invasion weapons, they became Sevenger's final opponent before its retirement. After killing a Pigmon, the Garamons were destroyed in explosion when Haruki exerted most of Sevenger's energy reserves against the monsters. Another Garamon was one of the many residents of an alien planet which Space Sevenger crash landed during its warp drive. Garamon accompanied Gandar and Icarus during their fight against the space robot. First appeared in episode 13 of Ultra Q.
- Friendly Rare-Beast Pigmon (友好珍獣 ピグモン, Yūkō Chinjū Pigumon; 5): A small monster encountered by Sevenger during its fight against a pair of Garamons. Pigmon was killed after being stomped by one of the Garamons. First appeared in episode 8 of Ultraman.
- Monster Planet residents (6, 7): During Space Sevenger's interstellar exploration, the robot crash-landed on a planet inhabited by monsters, forcing it to fend itself against the incoming monsters. Through Ultraman Z Beta Smash's arrival, the monsters were killed one by one.
  - Transformed Monster Gazort II (変形怪獣 ガゾートII, Henkei Kaijū Gazōto Tsū; 6): After accidentally stepping on Eleking's tail, Gazort was forced to fight the monster and eventually Space Sevenger as well into a three-way battle. It was killed after the robot uses a rod as a weapon. First appeared in episode 15 of Ultraman Tiga.
  - Twin-Headed Monster Re-Pandon (双頭怪獣 改造パンドン, Sōtō Kaijū Kaizō Pandon; 6, 7): A Pandon that was modified by its master into a cyborg monster weapon. It ambushed Space Sevenger after killing Gazort II and Eleking, and eventually joined by Icarus' gang of monsters. First appeared in episode 49 of Ultraseven.
  - Extra Dimensional Alien Alien Icarus (異次元宇宙人イカルス星人, Ijigen Uchūjin Ikarusu Seijin; 7): One of the many residents of an alien planet, bringing along a Gandar and Garamon into the fight against Space Sevenger. First appeared in episode 10 of Ultraseven.
  - Freezing Monster Gandar (凍結怪獣 ガンダー, Tōketsu Kaijū Gandā; 7, 9): One of Alien Icarus' monsters in fighting against Space Sevenger. In episode 9, another Gandar attacked the GAF base in Suflan Island to steal the freezing liquid for its own consumption, fighting against both Haruki/Sevenger and Pestar. It was killed after clashing its attack with Pestar. First appeared in episode 25 of Ultraseven.
  - Specter Phantom Alien Ghose (幽霊怪人 ゴース星人, Yūrei Kaijin Gōsu Seijin; 7): The true mastermind behind the monster army attack against Space Sevenger. Juggler killed the alien after the latter's monster army was eliminated by Space Sevenger and Z. First appeared in episode 48 of Ultraseven.
- Fortress Robot Beam Missile King (要塞ロボット ビームミサイルキング, Yōsai Robotto Bīmu Misairu Kingu; 8): A space robot armed with multitudes of cannons and firearms. Originally a defense turret set up at the GAF base in Suflan Island, cosmic energy radiated the turret and transformed it into Beam Missile King to threaten the freezing operation. It was defeated by Haruki/Sevenger. First appeared in the manga adaptation of Ultraman Mebius Side Story: Ghost Reverse.
- Oil Monster Pestar (油獣 ペスター, Yujū Pesutā; 9): A starfish-like monster that is native to Suflan Island's lake, attacking the GAFJ base after mistaking their freezing liquid tank for petroleum. It was killed after being tricked by Haruki/Sevenger into clashing its flames with Gandar's freezing breath. First appeared in episode 13 of Ultraman.
- Space Demon Alien Akumania (宇宙悪霊 アクマニヤ星人, Uchū Akuryō Akumaniya Seijin; 10): The leader of an army of monsters who transformed the GAF base's turret into Beam Missile King. Ultraman Leo killed the alien and the latter's minions. First appeared in episode 33 of Ultraman Leo.
- Oni Monster Onion (鬼怪獣 オニオン, Oni Kaijū Onion; 10): One of Alien Akumania's minions. First appeared in episode 27 of Ultraman Leo.
- Strange Alien Alien Kettle (怪異宇宙人 ケットル星人, Kaii Uchūjin Kettoru Seijin; 10): One of Alien Akumania's minions. First appeared in episode 11 of Ultraman Leo.
- Merman Alien Boze (半魚人 ボーズ星人, Hangyojin Bōzu Seijin; 10): One of Alien Akumania's minions. First appeared in episode 19 of Ultraman Leo.
- Space Insect Satanbeetle (宇宙昆虫 サタンビートル, Uchū Konchū Satanbītoru; 10): One of Alien Akumania's minions. In Ultraman Z, another Satanbeetle from Siberia was among the monsters absorbed by Ultroid Zero to transform into Destrudos. First appeared in episode 25 of Ultraman Leo.

=== Novel-exclusives ===
Life's Decision Height: The Story of STORAGE's Foundation

- Mars Monster Namegon (火星怪獣 ナメゴン, Kasei Kaijū Namegon): A monster that appeared five years prior to Ultraman Z. Originally a space gem extracted from Mars, Namegon came to existence when the gem accidentally fell into the ocean, resulting in the 30 meter monster's release. Even with the assistance of US army, Namegon rampaged in Japan for two weeks unopposed before Sevenger (piloted by Juggler) was created and sent to deal with it as the robot's first victory. First appeared in episode 3 of Ultra Q.

Ja no Michi wa Hebi

- Phantom Princess Biranki (夢幻怪姫 ビランキ, Mugen Kaiki Biranki): An alien girl from Ultraman Orb Chronicle novel, who persistently chasing after Juggler despite her love being one-sided. She willingly allowed herself to be captured by Phalaris and forced to wear a headband that restricted her control over monsters for the sake of meeting Juggler. As a result of manipulating Gango into fighting Grigio Raiden and was caught in the latter monster's blast, Biranki was rendered amnesiac, where Juggler puts her under the care of Jinobe and entrusted her with his pet snake before he departed with Raiden to Haruki's Earth in 2010. In Jugglus Juggler Chronicle Photo Book, she is portrayed by Hikari Kuroki, who also portrays Yuka Ohta in Ultraman Z.
- Brainwave Monster Gango (脳波怪獣 ギャンゴ, Nōha Kaijū Gyango): A monster that Biranki used to manipulate from Ultraman Orb Chronicle novel, as well as its brethren originally appearing in episode 11 of Ultraman. Biranki summoned it to fight against the Grigio Raiden that was manipulated by Phalaris. When Biranki's mind was erased due to Phalaris' machinations, Gango disappears in a puff of smoke.
- Rebeshie (レベシエ): A member of the Interstellar Alliance and the consul of Planet Kanon. Centuries after the events of Ultraman Orb: The Origin Saga, Planet Kanon has joined the Interstellar Alliance and the monarchy has been abolished. Rebeshie offered Juggler a chance at pardoning his crimes by apprehending Phalaris, disabling his gene bomb and saving Biranki. While Juggler managed to do all of the given assignments, he defied Rebeshie's orders by hiding Biranki under Jinobe's care and keeping the seed of the Tree of Life to himself.
- Phalaris (ファラリス, Fararisu): An alien weapons merchant also known as "Phalaris the Bull" (牡牛のファラリス, Ōshi no Fararisu), who hides his true frail elderly figure behind a muscular hologram. He sets up his base in Planet Baphomet (惑星バホメット, Wakusei Bahometto), which is also the capital of Imbat Federation (イムバット連邦, Imubatto Renpō). After being given a seed of the Tree of Life, Phalaris turned into a power hungry person who brainwashed and modified Sagittari/Grigio into Grigio Raiden and orchestrated a tournament between various evildoers in the universe to fight for the gene bomb he created. When Juggler became its victor, Phalaris had no intention of fulfilling his deal but he was killed by a falling rubble.
- Alien Arcana "Doman Seman" (アルカナ星人 ドーマンセーマン, Arukana Seijin Dōman Sēman): An alien hitman who contracted with darkness, which allows him to utilize randomly selected Monster Cards and harness their powers. He participated in a life-or-death battle over the seed of Tree of Life hosted by Phalaris. During his fight with Juggler, he got Greeza's Monster Card and was dragged into the void by the card's power.
- Brain Alien Alien Chibull "Mabuze" (頭脳星人 チブル星人 マブゼ, Zunō Seijin Chiburu Seijin Mabuze): An alien mad scientist from episode 15 of Ultraman Taiga, the novel itself chronicling his exploits prior to his onscreen debut. He participated in the hunt for the seed of Tree of Life and fought against Juggler through Zigzag, but bails out of fight once the alien swordsman uses Crowley to scare Mabuze. He would later join the Villain Guild to the events of Ultraman Taiga, where he created Darebolic for auctioning to the evil aliens.
- Synthetic Space Giant Zigzag (合成宇宙巨人 ジグザグ, Gōsei Uchū Kyojin Jiguzagu): Mabuze's artificial giant that he created by stitching the corpses various deceased beings, some of which were Alien Baltan, Alien Zamu and Alien Tsuruk. Juggler fought against the composite creature and once he terrified Mabuze into forfeiting from the match, Zigzag fell to the ground motionless.
- Anti-Gravity Alien Alien Godola: An alien who runs a tavern. When Grigio Raiden went rampaging on Planet Baphomet, Godola's tavern was one of the many casualties, but his and Salome's survival remains unconfirmed.
- Invasion Alien Alien Salome (侵略星人 サロメ星人, Shinryaku Seijin Sarome Seijin): An alien who worked as a dancer in Godola's tavern. After Juggler saved her from being harassed by one of the tavern's patrons, she provided him with the hint to Phalaris' hideout. First appeared in episode 46 of Ultraseven.
- Old Man Jinobe (ジノベー爺さん, Jinobē-jiisan): An alien swordsmith who lives on Planet La Rochefoucauld (惑星ラ・ロシュフコー, Wakusei Ra Roshufukō). He helped fixing Juggler's Jashin Blade and was entrusted to take care of the amnesiac Biranki before the latter's departure with Grigio Raiden.
- Space Merchant Alien Merkind (宇宙商人 マーキンド星人, Uchū Shōnin Mākindo Seijin): A weapons merchant who operates on Gang Satellite (ギャングサテライト, Gyangu Sateraito), a space colony that orbiting Planet Hydra (ハイドラ星, Haidora Sei). Merkind provided Juggler with the intel on Sagittari's past and Phalaris' rise to power. First appeared in episode 3 of Ultraseven X.
- Armor Alien Alien Borg "Mrs. Graia" (甲冑星人 ボーグ星人 グライア夫人, Katchū Seijin Bōgu Seijin Guraia-fujin): The seasoned leader of a clique of an all-female Alien Borg gang. Graia's knowledge of Celebro's Civilization Self-Destruction Game became the final piece for Juggler to figure out the source of Phalaris' grand scheme. The race first appeared in episode 27 of Ultraseven.
