= List of Ultraman Neos characters =

This is the character list of the 2000 direct to video Ultra Series Ultraman Neos.

== HEART ==
HEART (ハート, Hāto; High-tech Earth Alert and Rescue Team) is a special search team consist of particularly excellent members of the DJ's members. Its main objective is to deal with various mysterious incidents and difficult cases. In addition, HEART is operated under the control of the Government of Japan and the Cabinet Information Bureau (内閣情報局, Naikaku Jōhō-kyoku; CIB), since the general headquarters of DJ exists in Japan. In the pilot short of Ultraman Neos, HEART was preceded by GSG to fight against Alien Zamu but defeated by his sheer might.

HEART's name is a reference to the recurring themes of "love", "courage" and "romance" in the Ultra Series.

Members

General members usually wears the HEART Suit and HEART Met during missions, including the wrist communicator HEART-POP. Although their names were written by katakana in the show, kanji iterations were provided later on in the magazines.

- Genki Kagura (カグラ・ゲンキ（神楽 元気）, Kagura Genki): Originally a 22 years old astronaut of DJ's space branch, Kagura was drifted into the outer space due to being affected by a meteorite shower. To save his life, Ultraman Neos bonded with him as Kagura joined HEART not long after to investigate Dark Matter-related cases. Kagura is the team's rookie member with a bright personality and has strong faith towards his coworkers. Because of his survival from the outer space incident, he gained the nickname Miracle Man. During monster attacks, Kagura transforms through the use of Estraller (エストレーラー, Esutorērā) and raise the device upwards. He is portrayed by Jun Takatsuki (高槻 純, Takatsuki Jun).
- Gonpachi Minato (ミナト・ゴンパチ（港 権八）, Minato Gonpachi): The 41-year-old captain of HEART from Kumamoto Prefecture. A former defense force member whose professional in combat, he is familiar with land, sea and air situation, as well as handling heavy artillery. When appointed as the HEART captain, Minato agreed under the terms of choosing its members. He is portrayed by Kyusaku Shimada (嶋田 久作, Shimada Kyūsaku).
- Hironobu Uematsu (ウエマツ・ヒロノブ（植松 弘展）, Uematsu Hironobu): 30 years old and from Setagaya Ward, Tokyo and is the sub-captain, replacing Captain Minato in the combat field. Hironobu was a veteran police officer who solved various bizarre cases and incidents, to the point of even being hired as a member of the Interpol. He is also the team's marksman and had a great achievement in an Olympic tournament in Japan. He is portrayed by Shigeki Kagemaru (影丸 茂樹, Kagemaru Shigeki), who previously portrayed Tetsuo Shinjoh in Ultraman Tiga.
- Takayoshi Hino (ヒノ・タカヨシ（日野 隆義）, Hino Takayoshi): A 26 years old mechanic expert from Ibaraki Prefecture. He holds various doctoral degrees in physics, radio waves, fluid mechanics, aerospace engineering, metal engineering and electronic engineering among others. He is portrayed by Taketora Morita (森田 猛虎, Morita Taketora).
- Nana Hayami (ハヤミ・ナナ（速水 奈々）, Hayami Nana): (Note: Her family name is written as "速見" in the Ultraman Dictionary.) 24 years old and is the team's biology expert. She was previously a doctor from Kyoto Prefecture with specialty for heart surgery. She is portrayed by Atsuko Rukawa (瑠川 あつこ, Rukawa Atsuko).
- Ayumi Kitabayashi (キタバヤシ・アユミ（北林 歩）, Kitabayashi Ayumi): 19 years old computer expert from Naponee, Nebraska, US, who graduated from college at the age of 15 years old. Ayumi worked as HEART's communication officer and can understand seven languages, including, English, French and Spanish. She is portrayed by Mika Sakamoto (坂本 三佳, Sakamoto Mika).

Defense Juris-diction

The Defense Juris-diction (国際防衛機構, Kokusai Bōei Kikō; shortened as "DJ") is an organization founded by United Nations in 2001 to protect the worldwide welfare, freedom and peace through cutting-edge scientific developments. Aside from various branches worldwide, there is also a division for outer space exploration. Despite their presence in the show, the organization was never referred to its name as such, with their Japanese branch's headquarters served as HEART's base of operations.

- Yōko Fujiwara (フジワラ・ヨウコ（藤原 陽子）, Fujiwara Yōko): The secretary officer who served as a pipeline in between the Cabinet Information Bureau and HEART. She is portrayed by Satomi Murakami (村上 聡美, Murakami Satomi) and is based on the actress Norika Fujiwara.
- Katagiri (カタギリ): Fujiawara's direct supervisor, who ordered Giga Dread's immediate expulsion to outer space, regardless of Captain Minato being trapped in it. Despite his ruthless approach, in truth he is a coward who tries to hide a military secret from HEART members. He is portrayed by Wataru Shihōdō (四方堂 亘, Shihōdō Wataru).
- Kisaragi (キサラギ（如月）): The chief of CIB's Special Security Force, he was tasked with leading his men to capture Esura during Mensch Heit's threat on Earth under orders from the government. After the alien revealed his appearance as an ancient demon prophesied in the ancient times, he backed down from meddling with HEART's operation. He is portrayed by Sakae Kimura (木村 栄, Kimura Sakae).

=== Mechas and vehicles ===
GSG

Aside from HEART Runner, GSG's known fighting forces were McDonnell Douglas F-4 Phantom II fighter and Leopard 1 tank, both of which diverted from scenes of Ultraman 80.

- HEART Runner (ハートラナー, Hāto Ranā): A pair of V/STOL fighter jets that appeared in the pilot episode to intercept the Alien Zamu.

HEART

- HEART Warmer (ハートワーマー, Hāto Wāmā): A high performance jet which served as HEART's own mobile base. It can also deploy Heart Beater patrol cars and fight in the battlefield.
- HEART Winner (ハートウィナー, Hāto Uinā): A pair of multipurpose combat aircraft deployed from the base.
- HEART Beater RX (ハートビーターRX, Hāto Bītā Āru Ekkusu): A Mitsubishi Pajero 4WD built with sturdy materials that could withstand punishment.
- HEART Beater SX (ハートビーターSX, Hāto Bītā Esu Ekkusu): An Isuzu Vehicross patrol vehicle which can transform into defensive mode for low altitude travel by folding its tires and covering the windows with shutters.
- Gravity Blocking Device (重力遮断装置, Jūryoku Shadan Sōchi): Four parabolic antennae which is capable of lifting an object to space via anti gravity. It was used to lift Giga Dread to space to prevent its detonation on Earth.
- Special Work Vehicle (特殊作業車, Tokushu Sagyō-sha): Several vehicles that carry one of the four Gravity Blocking Devices.
- V.D.L.C.: An attack vehicle which was initially suggested to be used in against Giga Dread but was rejected due to the possibility of triggering the bomb it held.

DJ

- Space Shuttle (スペースシャトル, Supēsu Shatoru): An unnamed space shuttle which appeared in the show's opening scene.
- Radio telescope (電波望遠鏡, Denpa Bōenkyō): A DJ-affiliated space satellite used for space observation and distributed information to Earth. It appeared in the show's opening and destroyed by a hailing barrage of meteorite shower caused by Dark Matter, resulting in the DJ member Kagura drifting into space and meeting the Ultramen.

== Ultramen ==
=== Ultraman Neos ===
Ultraman Neos (ウルトラマンネオス, Urutoraman Neosu) is the titular hero of the series, whose affiliated to the Elite Task Force (勇士司令部, Yūshi Shirei-bu), a division of elite Ultra Warriors from the Land of Light. Having bonded to an astronaut/HEART member Genki Kagura, Ultraman Neos faced against monsters born from the adverse effects of Dark Matter with the help from HEART members and Ultraseven 21.

Ultraman Neos' fighting skill involves the use of supernatural abilities and martial arts movements. As with general Ultramen, Neos can only stay active on Earth atmosphere for 3 minutes before his Color Timer (カラータイマー, Karā Taimā) turned red to notify his limit. His main finishers are Neo Magnium Ray (ネオマグニウム光線, Neo Maguniumu Kōsen) and Ultra Eddie Beam (ウルトラ・エディ・ビーム, Urutora Edi Bīmu). From the Blow Spot (ブロウスポット, Burō Supotto) on his forehead, he can fire the Ultra Multi Beam (ウルトラ・マルチ・ビーム, Urutora Maruchi Bīmu). With Ultra Metamorphose (ウルトラメタモーフォーズ, Urutora Metamōfōzu), Neos can reshape the energy from his body into light-based solid projections, used for attacks such as Ultra Light Sword (ウルトラ・ライト・ソード, Urutora Raito Sōdo), Ultra Light Langer (ウルトラ・ライト・ランガー, Urutora Raito Rangā) and Ultra Light Barrier (ウルトラ・ライト・バリアー, Urutora Raito Bariā).

He is named after the Greek word "Neo" and is designed by Hiroshi Maruyama. For his appearance in the 12-episode series, Neos' main body was redesigned as he was given a sharper mask and excess gloves and boots inserted within the suit, a trait that was established since Ultraman Tiga. His rising scene is remodeled from the doll used to portray Ultraman Gaia.

=== Ultraseven 21 ===
Ultraseven 21 (ウルトラセブン21, Urutorasebun Tsū Wan) is the secondary Ultra Warrior of the series and Neos' partner in his active period on Earth. When the Inter Galactic Defense Force (宇宙警備隊, Uchū Keibitai) detected a danger on Earth, their subsidiary Galactic Security Agency (宇宙保安庁, Uchū Hoanchō) try to send their veteran agent Seven 21 under the chief's order but unfortunately another incident happened in Seven's patrolling area. Unable to leave his post, his chief was forced to ask for help from the Elite Task Force, who in turn send their member Neos to Earth. As the danger on Earth increases, Seven intervened on multiple occasions to support Ultraman Neos.

In comparison to Neos, Ultraseven 21 makes use of his ESP and stealth missions, disguising as multiple humans per each episode and can also fight in human size to maintain his cover. His main weapon is the Velzard (ヴェルザード, Veruzādo), a removable crest dagger that can be used as a boomerang appendage. (Note: Alternatively named as 21 Slugger (21スラッガー, Tsū Wan Suraggā).) His finishers are Adrium Ray (アドリウム光線, Adoriumu Kōsen) from his Beam Lamp and Regia Shot (レジア・ショット, Rejia Shotto). Like Neos, he can also use Ultra Metamorphose to create an object of light, creating the fireball projectile shot Ultra Fire Ball (ウルトラ・ファイヤー・ボール, Urutora Faiyā Bōru).

Ultraseven 21 is voiced by Isshin Chiba (千葉 一伸, Chiba Isshin) and is named after the 21st century of the Anno Domini era. Likewise with Neos, Seven 21 was designed by Maruya after Ultraseven with his Protector covering his arms as well. He received his redesign in the 12-episode series. In the pilot version, Seven 21 has the ability to change facial expression.

==== Seven 21's human forms ====
On Earth, Seven occasionally assumed different human forms to blend in with the society.

- Unnamed girl (2): The unnamed girl in white is a sympathizer of the Alien Zamu who conversed with their leader on his project to absorb the Dark Matter. When it failed, she rescued the alien's captives, reverted into Seven 21 and ordering Kagura to transform. She is portrayed by Mariya Izawa (伊澤 麻璃也, Izawa Mariya).
- Shinya Kenmochi (剣持 慎也, Kenmochi Shin'ya; 4): A worker from a local television station, when he tried to go to Shioname to save his girlfriend (a reporter) Seven 21 borrowed his likeness to save the former's girlfriend before joining Neos in fighting against Nozera and Sazora. He is portrayed by Kunio Masaoka (正岡 邦夫, Masaoka Kunio), who previously portrayed officer Shima in Heisei Ultraseven.
- Sean Uncle (ショーン・アンクル, Shōn Ankuru; 6): An FBI agent from America who traced an Alien Zamu that impersonated as Dr. Ōtomo. Seven 21 borrowed Sean's likeness to observe Alien Zamu's attempt in thwarting the Dark Matter Countermeasure Conference while stopping the Zamu impostor by reclaiming Kagura/Neos' Estraller and rescuing Fujiwara and Nana from the facility itself. He is portrayed by Earl Scott (アール・スコット, Āru Sukotto).
- Masato Usami (宇佐美 将人, Usami Masato; 8): An old professor who used to be Nana's mentor until he died. When his daughter found solace in Lafreshion, Seven 21 borrowed his appearance to contact Nana in saving the girl and helped her moving on from her late father's death. He is portrayed by Uketa Take (タケ・ウケタ, Take Uketa), who also portrayed Masayuki Nahara in Ultraman Tiga.

=== Zoffy ===
First appeared in the final episode of Ultraman, Zoffy (ゾフィー, Zofī) is the leader of the Space Garrison and member of the Ultra Brothers, having saved the Earth countless times in the past. When a different planet Earth entered the Unbalance Zone, he observed Neos' fusion with the astronaut Genki Kagura and the Ultra's exploits on Earth. When Neos exhausted his energies from fighting Grall, Zoffy warned the Ultra not to fight again during his trip to obtain a life force from the Land of Light.

Zoffy is voiced by Akitoshi Ōtaki (大滝 明利, Ōtaki Akitoshi), who is also his suit actor.

== Monsters and Aliens ==
=== Alien Zamu ===
The Brain Spirit Aliens Alien Zamu (脳魂宇宙人 ザム星人, Nōkon Uchūjin Zamu Seijin) was a major alien race in Ultraman Neos. Although a single member appeared in the pilot short as a malicious invader, the race itself portrayed as fugitives who fled their home planet, Planet Zamu, the 9th Planet of YY System from the reign of Dark Matter. Since then the race try to survive on Planet Earth while the Dark Matter influence reach said planet. The entire race was wiped out by Mensch Heit's assassin, Grall, with the endling Esura sacrificed his life to replenish Neos and Seven 21's energies. The Zamu race had their DNA memory stored in a special canister, which is currently in HEART's possession as they prepare to find a way to restore the race.

Instead of recycling suit, all appearing Alien Zamu are newly built. The design drafts for Alien Zamu had been reworked into the Alien Standels from Ultraman Tiga.

- Pilot episode: The very first Alien Zamu to appear is a malevolent invader who targeted Earth alongside its monster Drengeran. Its head houses the brain soul Plaza Soul (プラザソウル, Puraza Sōru), which allowed him to revive from every defeat and fires the attack Zamu Beam (ザムビーム, Zamu Bīmu). After Drengeran's defeat, the alien escaped from Earth while being pursued by Neos and Seven 21.
- Episode 2: The leader of the Alien Zamu lead his kind to seek refuge on Earth. Wanting to inhabit another planet for his kind, he constructed the Zamu Tower (ザムタワー, Zamu Tawā) on Earth to infuse the Dark Matter energy into his body and evolve. The process failed and it turned the Zamu leader into a mindless monster-sized rampant as Genki was forced to heed on the alien's wish on killing him as Ultraman Neos. The remaining Alien Zamu fled in their spaceship as Neos stopped HEART from killing them. The Alien Zamu leader is voiced by Takashi Nagasako (長嶝 高士, Nagasako Takashi). He was originally themed after the Zamu from Pilot episode until Hiroshi Maruyama further redesign him into his current state.
- Episode 6: After the death of their leader, a particular female Alien Zamu was led to believe that the future of their kind had lost and tried to enact revenge on mankind and Ultraman Neos, despite her leader's death was his own doing. She posed as Dr. Natsumi Ōtomo (オオトモ・ナツミ, Ōtomo Natsumi) who attended the Dark Matter Countermeasure Conference in Japan, stealing the Estraller from Kagura and locked the facility for Zamurevenger to attack. Seven 21 fought against her by returning Estraller to Kagura, who likewise transformed to fight the killer robot. The female Zamu committed suicide by evaporation after affirming that her revenge had been fulfilled. Natsumi Ōtomo is portrayed by Yasuyo Shirashima (白島 靖代, Shirashima Yasuyo).
- Episode 11: When Grall made its move to assassinate the Alien Zamu remnants on Earth, a white-colored member appeared to protect its kin but was killed in mere seconds.
- Esura (エスラー, Esurā; 11, 12): A young Alien Zamu and the last of his kind, his name correspond to his mission to sacrifice his life for his race to be revived through the Seed Recorder (シードレコーダー, Shīdo Rekōdā), a device which contains 1 billion genetic information of his kind. Because of this, he was on the run from Mensch Heit and the Defense Juris-diction who wanted him to be detained while finding protection under Kagura and Nana. When Neos and Seven 21 were about to be defeated, he entrusted the Seed Recorder to Nana and used up the last of his energy to revive both Ultras at the cost of his own life. He is portrayed by Ippei Andō (安藤 一平, Andō Ippei). The scriptwriter Junki Takegami originally conceived Esura's human form as an 8-year-old boy.

Servants

- Space Ore Monster Drengeran (宇宙鉱石怪獣 ドレンゲラン, Uchū Kōseki Kaijū Dorengeran; Pilot): A monster controlled by the malevolent Zamu as part of Earth invasion. Its body is protected by the space ore, is capable of elongating its neck and exhale flames. Both alien and monster cornered Neos until Seven 21 arrived to even the odds. Drengeran is killed by Neos' Magnium Ray and Seven 21's Adrium Ray.
- Revenge Robot Zamurevenger (復讐ロボット ザムリベンジャー, Fukushū Robotto Zamuribenjā; 6): A killer robot created by the Alien Zamu remnants to enact revenge on Ultraman Neos for killing their leader and thwarted mankind's attempt in resisting against the Dark Matter. Originally appeared as a space saucer, it transformed into its robot form and shrug off all of Ultraman Neos' attacks. When Seven 21 crushed its controller bracelet, the Zamurevenger was deemed powerless and deactivated by Neos' Neos Punch on its head. Since the Alien Zamu controlling it is a woman, Zamurevenger was designed with a feminine body and decorated with Polynesian tattoo.

=== Mensch Heit ===
Ultimate Evolution Emperor Mensch Heit (究極進化帝王 メンシュハイト, Kyūkyoku Shinka Teiō Menshu Haito; 11, 12) is the main antagonist of Ultraman Neos. A personification of the Dark Matter, Mensch Heit proclaims himself as the rightful defender of the space, deeming the Alien Zamu as barbarians and drove them away from their home planet. Intending to invade the Earth, he coerced the leaders of Defense Juris-diction to hand over Esura but revealed his true colors to the Earthlings by unveiling his monster form. He had once used a spy drone named Tracker (トラッカー, Torakkā) to chase Esura on Earth.

After his personal assassin Grall was killed by Neos, Mensch Heit threatened Kisaragi to issue a manhunt on Esura. He would later on transform into his true form resembling a devil from Earth's ancient manuscripts. Through its horns, Mensch Heit used its ESP to subdue Seven 21 and the already weakened Neos before Esura replenished both Ultras' energies. The two would retaliate by severing its horns and destroying Mensch Heit with Neo Magnium Ray and Regia Shot, avenging the Zamu race's demise.

Mensch Heit is portrayed by Mister Chin (ミスターちん, Misutā Chin).

=== Dark Matter ===
The Dark Matter (ダークマター, Dāku Matā) is a mysterious energy substance located in the Unbalance Zone (アンバランスゾーン, Anbaransu Zōn) area of outer space. For the first time in 3 million years, Earth's orbit entered this area, which resulted in the Unbalance Phenomenon (アンバランス現象, Anbaransu Genshō) to occur worldwide, such as monster attacks in Japan as HEART and Ultraman Neos deal with the incoming threat. By the time Grall appeared, Earth has exited the Unbalance Zone as Neos and Seven 21 left the planet in aftermath of their fight with Mensch Heit.

- Vein Monster Arnagaruge (鉱脈怪獣 アーナガルゲ, Kōmyaku Kaijū Ānagaruge; 1): The first monster to appear, Arnagaruge was born from the Dark Matter influence on the microbes from Aga Mine. Its name comes from a deity revered by the locals whose associated with said mining area. Arnagaruge arises from the mountains with Nana's HRT Beater RX stuck to it, forcing Kagura to eject from his HRT Warmer and transformed into Neos. Hino fired a cooling missile, which prevented Arnagaruge from reforming its body parts as Neos fired his Neo Magnium Ray and destroy the monster after saving the HRT Beater RX.
- Swarm Monster Seagorian (群体怪獣 シーゴリアン, Guntai Kaijū Shīgorian; 3): A school of fishes that combined under the influence of the Dark Matter. Its original size was 15 meters but grows larger by assimilating with every fishes it went to, e.g. the Nagai harbor, a local aquarium and a lake. By the time it reached its final destination (Fisheries Research Station), Seagorian grew into 69 meters. After an intense battle, Neos reverted the monster into the fishes through Ultra Release Ray. Its roars were diverted from Peter of Ultra Q.
- Arctic Monster Nozera (北極怪獣 ノゼラ, Hokkyoku Kaijū Nozera; 4): Nozera was a creature born from 3 million years prior during Earth's previous influence from Dark Matter. As the cycle repeated, Nozera awakened from its long period of slumber and burrow its way to Shioname, Tokyo in search for its companion, Sazora. Nozera mistook a building's noise as its companion and went on a rampage until Sazora reappeared, a blast from HEART's patrol car provoked the two as Neos, later joined by Seven 21 fought against them. Nozera was killed by Neos' Neo Magnium Ray.
- Antarctic Monster Sazora (南極怪獣 サゾラ, Nankyoku Kaijū Sazora; 4): Nozera's companion from Antarctic, Sazora flew at the speed of Mach 4 towards Tokyo to reunite with the former and fought against HEART members. While fighting against the Ultramen, Sazora willingly sold out its partner, throwing Nozera to the Ultras off-guard in an attempt to escape but was thwarted shortly after and became the receiving end of Seven 21's Regia Shot.
- Insect Monster Shildoban (昆虫怪獣 シルドバン, Konchū Kaijū Shirudoban; 5): A cicada monster born from the influence of Dark Matter, it possess a sturdy exoskeleton and a pair of sickles for its hands. It appeared from a construction site nearby the Asahigaoka housing complex and was quickly killed by a bullet piercing through its unprotected abdomen. Although received a proper burial by HEART, Backacoon manipulated its corpse into a puppet.
  - Re-Shildoban (再生シルドバン, Saisei Shirudoban; 5): The corpse of Shildoban was used by Backacoon into a zombie slave through its tail, additionally usurping what was left of Shildoban's nutrients akin to a caterpillar fungus. After Hino fired on the vine, Shildoban was left as a lifeless carcass again.
- Parasitic Monster Backacoon (寄生怪獣 バッカクーン, Kisei Kaijū Bakkakūn; 5): A strange mushroom which appeared in the next day after Shildoban's burial. Backacoon draws its nutrient from the deceased monster in akin to a caterpillar fungus. It first appeared in the vicinity of Asahigaoka and sustain the firepower from Hino's weapon. Later on, it developed into a monster and fought against Neos while resurrecting Shildoban as its puppet to attack the Ultra. Hino fired upon the vine that connected to Shildoban, separating Backacoon from its source of nutrients and killed by Neos' Neo Magnium Ray.
- Metamorphosis Monster King Bamos (変貌怪獣 キングバモス, Henbō Kaijū Kingu Bamosu; 7): The strongest monster in Aragami Island (荒神島, Aragami-jima), who despite its immense strength and a creation from Dark Matter, is a benevolent creature to humans. it was nicknamed Bamo-chan (バモちゃん) by Dr. Naruse, a researcher who was rescued by the former from several Rock Eaters. When HEART try to fetch him back, Naruse refused and wanted to accompany King Bamos. When agitated, King Bamos can grow into large proportions and kill its opponents with ease, but went berserk from killing the giant Rock Eater. After being soothed by Dr. Naruse's music box, King Bamos regained its composure as Neos revert it to human size through Ultra Minimum Ray. King Bamos is voiced by Madoka Fukuoka (福岡 まどか, Fukuoka Madoka).
- Ferocious Dragon Rock Eater (凶暴竜 ロックイーター, Kyōbō Ryū Rokku Ītā; 7): Carnivorous monsters who murdered the entire research team that came to Aragami Island. Their hides are impenetrable to gunfire until Bamos saved Naruse by scaring them away, as it did the same to HEART members Kagura and Nana. The next day, a bigger Rock Eater attacked Dr. Naruse, causing an enraged Bamos to grow large and kill it. Three costumes were made by remodeling those from event attractions.
- Holy Magical Beast Lafreshion (幻聖魔獣 ラフレシオン, Gensei Majū Rafureshion; 8): A Dark Matter monster whose appearance happened to resemble the similarly named fictional creature from the late Professor Usami's book. It was taken care by her daughter Misaki, who believed that the monster could reconnect her with her late father and raise it in a hidden basement. Years later, it grew into large proportions and demonstrated the ability to purify sea and vegetations but brings an adverse effect to animals and would turn Earth into an unpopulated planet within 8 months. When Lafreshion resurfaced, it revealed its true colors to a disillusioned Misaki and was killed by Neos after severing its horn. Its change of face was made by the director to emphasize Misaki's delusion.
- Combined Dinosaur King Dinos (合体恐竜 キングダイナス, Gattai Kyōryū Kingu Dainasu; 9): When three local children misunderstood that their favorite roller coaster would be dismantled, they try to create a phony monster attack by notifying it to HEART and bury the fossils stolen from their school laboratory. The Dark Matter radiated said fossils and brought their imaginative monster to life. It was killed by Ultraman Neos and reverted to its fossil components.
- Meteorite Monster Giga Dread (隕石怪獣 ギガドレッド, Inseki Kaijū Giga Doreddo; 10): A creature born from space microorganisms mutated by Dark Matter, it absorbed all of Earth's satellites and absorbed the HEART Beater SX boarded by Captain Minato. To make matters worse, a self destruct bomb was activated and would detonate an area within 300 km radius within 12 hours. The next day, Giga Dread awakened and try to thwart the HEART members until Neos and Seven 21 appeared. Once Giga Dread was elevated to space, Neos rescued Captain Minato from the monster's own explosion.
- Assassination Monster Grall (暗殺怪獣 グラール, Ansatsu Kaijū Gurāru; 11): The last monster to appear in the series, it is a combination of all Dark Matter-based organisms from outer space and was among those who banished the Alien Zamu race from their planet. It went to Earth and destroyed all members save for Esura, who managed to evade its detection. As Grall marched its way to Esura, HEART members fought against it and Kagura joined in as Neos. Neos managed to defeat the monster but at the expense of his own health when Grall drained most of his energies beforehand.

=== Other ===
- Super Scientific Alien Dark Baltan (超科学星人 ダークバルタン, Chō Kagaku Seijin Dāku Barutan): An Alien Baltan (バルタン星人, Barutan Seijin) who appeared in the Mayday's music video, fighting Ultraman Neos in Taiwan. He first appeared in episodes 33 and 34 of Ultraman Max.
