= Ultraman Orb: The Chronicle =

- Poster featuring Gai Kurenai and other forms of Ultraman Orb.
- Genre: Superhero; Science fiction Kaiju; Kyodai Hero
- Created by: Tsuburaya Productions
- Starring: Hideo Ishiguro
- Country of origin: Japan
- No. of episodes: 26

Production
- Running time: 24–25 min. (per episode)

Original release
- Network: TV Tokyo
- Release: January 6 – June 30, 2018

Related
- Ultraman the Prime; Ultraman New Generation Chronicle

Ultraman Orb: The Chronicle (ウルトラマンオーブ THE CHRONICLE, Urutoraman Ōbu Za Kuronikuru) is a biography series produced by Tsuburaya Productions. This show follows a format similar to Ultraman Retsuden and Ultraman Zero: The Chronicle, featuring Gai Kurenai, the alter ego of the titular character Ultraman Orb navigating the viewers to the Ultraman Orb series, including other spin-offs and adaptations that featured Gai as the main character. The show aired on January 6, 2018, on the Japanese television network TV Tokyo at the time of 9:00 am.

== Episodes ==
1. Fight! Ultraman Orb! (戦え！ウルトラマンオーブ！, Tatakae! Urutoraman Ōbu)
2. The Sunset Wanderer - Crash! Maga-Basser (夕陽の風来坊 激突！マガバッサー, Yūhi no Fūraibō Gekitotsu! Maga Bassā)
3. The Lord of Earth - Maga-Grand King's Threat! (土塊の魔王 マガグランドキングの脅威！, Tsuchikure no Maō Maga Gurando Kingu no Kyōi!)
4. Monstrous Waters - Defeat Maga-Jappa! (怪獣水域 マガジャッパを倒せ, Kaijū Suiiki Maga Jappa o Taose!)
5. Maga-Pandon's Assault! - Beware of Fire in the Midsummer Sky (マガパンドン襲来！真夏の空に火の用心, Maga Pandon Shūrai Manatsu no Sora ni Hinoyōjin)
6. A Heart That Won't Run Away - Hurricane Slash's Appearance! (逃げない心 ハリケーンスラッシュ参上！, Nigenai Kokoro Harikēn Surasshu Sanjō!)
7. Fierce Fight! Fusion Up Fight! (激闘！フュージョンアップファイト！, Gekitō! Fyūjon Appu Faito!)
8. Ultraman Orb The Movie: Let Me Borrow the Power of Bonds! Chapter 1: Sadeath's Return (劇場版 ウルトラマンオーブ 絆の力、おかりします！ 第1章 サデスの帰還, Gekijōban Urutoraman Ōbu Kizuna no Chikara, Okarishimasu! Dai Isshō Sadesu no Kikan)
9. Ultraman Orb The Movie: Let Me Borrow the Power of Bonds! Chapter 2: Space Witch Thief Murnau's Counterattack (劇場版 ウルトラマンオーブ 絆の力、おかりします！ 第2章 宇宙魔女賊ムルナウの逆襲, Gekijōban Urutoraman Ōbu Kizuna no Chikara, Okarishimasu! Dai Nishō Uchū Majo Zoku Murunau no Gyakushū)
10. Ultraman Orb The Movie: Let Me Borrow the Power of Bonds! Chapter 3: New Generation (劇場版 ウルトラマンオーブ 絆の力、おかりします！ 第3章 新たなる世代, Gekijōban Urutoraman Ōbu Kizuna no Chikara, Okarishimasu! Dai Sanshō Aratanaru Sedai)
11. Babarue's Heart - The Impostor Blues (ババルウの心 ニセモノのブルース, Babarū no Kokoro Nisemono no Burūsu)
12. Trouble! Mama Is Here! - Maga-Orochi's Resurrection (大変！ママが来た！復活のマガオロチ, Taihen! Mama ga Kita! Fukkatsu no Maga Orochi)
13. The Dark King's Blessing - Birth! Thunder Breastar (黒き王の祝福 誕生！サンダーブレスター, Kuroki Ō no Shukufuku Tanjō! Sandā Buresutā)
14. An Unforgettable Place - Struggling Fight! Zeppandon (忘れられない場所 大苦戦！ゼッパンドン, Wasurenai Basho Dai Kusen! Zeppandon)
15. The Holy Sword, Restored - Awaken! Orb Origin!! (復活の聖剣 覚醒せよ！オーブオリジン！！, Fukkatsu no Seiken Kakusei seyo! Ōbu Orijin!!)
16. Hard-boiled River - Shibukawa's Long Day (ハードボイルドリバー シブカワの長い一日, Hādoboirudo Ribā Shibukawa no Nagai Ichinichi)
17. The Unmarked Café - Mysterious! The Organic Saucer Nova (地図にないカフェ 怪奇！円盤生物ノーバ, Chizu ni Nai Kafe Kaiki! Enban Seibutsu Nōba)
18. The Blade of Darkness - Orb vs. Juggler (闇の刃 オーブ対ジャグラー, Yami No Yaiba Ōbu Tai Jagurā)
19. The Ultimate Lord Monster Strikes Back - Magata no Orochi! (逆襲の超大魔王獣 マガタノオロチ！, Gyakushū no Chō Dai Maō-jū Magata no Orochi!)
20. The Wandering Sun - The Greatest Decisive Battle on Earth! (さすらいの太陽 地球最大の決戦！, Sasurai no Taiyō Chikyū Saidai no Kessen!)
21. Ultra Fight Orb: Let Me Borrow the Power of Father and Son! (ウルトラファイトオーブ 親子の力、おかりします！, Urutora Faito Ōbu Oyako no Chikara, Okarishimasu!)
22. Desperate Battle for Sunrise - Ginga and Victory! (朝焼けの死闘 ギンガ＆ビクトリー！, Asayake no Shitō Ginga Ando Bikutorī!)
23. Sword of Victory - Fierce Battle! Ultraman X (勝利への剣 激闘！ウルトラマンエックス, Shōri e no Tsurugi Gekitō! Urutoraman Ekkusu)
24. The Shining Sky, and the Land Beneath It - Gathering! Three Great Ultramen (光る大空、繋がる大地 集結！3大ウルトラマン, Hikaru Ōzora, Tsunagaru Daichi Shūketsu! San Dai Urutoraman)
25. The Leo Brothers vs. the Monster Brothers - When the Eyes of the Lion Shine! (レオ兄弟対兄弟怪獣 獅子の瞳が輝くとき！, Reo Kyōdai Tai Kaijū Kyōdai Shishi no Hitomi ga Kagayaku Toki!)
26. Reach Them, Orb's Prayer! - New Heroes Appear! (届けオーブの祈り！新たなる英雄(ヒーロー)登場！, Todoke Ōbu no Inori! Aratanaru Hīrō Tōjō!)

== Cast ==
- Gai Kurenai (クレナイ・ガイ, Kurenai Gai): Hideo Ishiguro (石黒 英雄, Ishiguro Hideo)
- Katsumi Minato (湊 カツミ, Minato Katsumi; 26): Yuya Hirata (平田 雄也, Hirata Yūya)
- Isami Minato (湊 イサミ, Minato Isami; 26): Ryosuke Koike (小池 亮介, Koike Ryōsuke)
- Voice of light (26): Takahiro Sakurai (櫻井 孝宏, Sakurai Takahiro)

== Songs ==
Opening theme

- "Orb no Inori" (オーブの祈り, Ōbu no Inori; lit. "Orb's Prayer")
  - Lyrics & Composition: Toshihiko Takamizawa (高見沢 俊彦, Takamizawa Toshihiko)
  - Arrangement: Toshihiko Takamizawa with Yuichiro Honda (本田 優一郎, Honda Yūichirō)
  - Artists: Ichiro Mizuki (水木 一郎, Mizuki Ichirō) with Voyager (ボイジャー, Boijā)
  Starting from Episode 8, May J. joins in the original artist to sing the opening theme.

Insert theme

- "HERO"
  - Lyrics: May J., Risa Horie
  - Composition: May J., Sho Kamijo
  - Arrangement: Sho Kamijo
  - Artist: May J.
