= Yūji Kobayashi =

Japanese screenwriter and novelist (born 1979)

- 小林 雄次
- Born: September 3, 1979 (age 47); Nagano Prefecture, Japan
- Occupations: Screenwriter, novelist
- Writing career
- Notable works: Garo series; Ultraman franchise; Sailor Moon Crystal (Seasons 1-3)

Japanese name
- Kanji: 小林 雄次
- Hiragana: こばやし ゆうじ
- Romanization: Kobayashi Yūji

Yūji Kobayashi (Japanese: 小林 雄次, Hepburn: Kobayashi Yūji; born September 3, 1979) is a Japanese screenwriter and novelist that is mostly known for his work on Garo series, Ultraman franchise, and the first three seasons of Pretty Guardian Sailor Moon Crystal series.

== Career ==
Born and raised from Nagano Prefecture, Kobayashi graduated from Japan University's department of Arts and Theater's Film Studies Scenario Writing course. In 2002, Yuji Kobayashi started working as a screenwriter and wrote an anime, Sazae-san. Since then, Kobayashi has written scripts for various tokusatsu, anime and novelized products, such as Garo, and Ultraman franchise. He is also a part time teacher at his alma-mater.

In 2014, after writing various episodes for Suite PreCure, Smile PreCure! and Saint Seiya Omega anime series, Kobayashi was chosen as a head writer for the Sailor Moon reboot series, titled Pretty Guardian Sailor Moon Crystal. He was involved in the anime until the end of its third season.

In 2020, Kobayashi wrote the anime film adaptation of Fushigi Dagashiya Zenitendō, as well the television series.

== Filmography ==
=== TV Tokusatsu ===
Year	Title	Credit	Note
2004	Ultra Q: Dark Fantasy	Script (eps. 19, 26)	
2005-06	Garo	Script (eps. 1-25)	
2005-06	Ultraman Max	Script (eps. 1-2, 9, 22-24, 37, EX)	
2006-07	Ultraman Mebius	Script (eps. 4, 8, 26, 35, 47)	
2006	Bio Planet WoO	Script (eps. 4, 11-13)	
2007	Juken Sentai Gekiranger	Script (eps. 31, 36, 39, 43)	
2007	Ultraseven X	Script (eps. 1, 6, 10–12)	
2009	Ultra Galaxy Mega Monster Battle: Never Ending Odyssey	Script (eps. 6)	
2011-12	Garo: Makai Senki	Script (eps. 13)	
2012	Ultra Zero Fight	Script	
2014	Ultraman Ginga S	Series Composition, Script	
2015	Ultraman X	Series Composition, Script (eps. 1, 7, 11, 22)	
2016	Ultraman Orb	Series Composition, Script (eps. 2, 7, 10, 17, 24)	
2018	Ultraman R/B	Script (eps. 7, 20)	
2020	Ultraman Z	Script (eps. 8, 16, 20)	

=== Live-action film ===
Year	Title	Credit	Note
1995	Mechanical Violator Hakaider	Himself	Acting-role
2009	Mega Monster Battle: Ultra Galaxy	Screenplay	Co-written with Junya Okabe and Tatsuro Kashihara
2012	Space Sheriff Gavan: The Movie	Screenplay	
2015	Ultraman Ginga S The Movie	Screenplay	Co-written with Takao Nakano
2016	Ultraman X The Movie	Screenplay	Co-written with Takao Nakano and Hirotoshi Kobayashi
2018	HE-LOW	Screenplay	

=== TV Anime ===
Year	Title	Credit	Note
2002	Sazae-san	Script	
2008	Himitsu – Top Secret	Script (eps. 10, 16)	
2009	Aoi Bungaku	Script (eps. 11–12)	
2011-12	Suite PreCure	Script (eps. 22, 29, 33, 38, 42, 45)	
2012-13	Smile PreCure!	Script (eps. 3, 8, 12, 17, 20, 26, 33, 37, 41)	
2012-14	Saint Seiya Omega	Script (eps. 55–56, 59, 64, 72)	
2016	Pretty Guardian Sailor Moon Crystal Season III	Series Composition, Script (eps. 1–13)	Death Busters arc
2019-20	Star Twinkle PreCure	Script (eps. 6, 12, 18, 25, 34, 39)	
2020	Fushigi Dagashiya Zenitendō	Series Composition	
2026	Kusunoki's Garden of Gods	Series Composition	
2027	Reincarnation in the Game World Dan-Katsu	Series Composition, Script	

=== Anime film ===
Year	Title	Credit	Note
2020	Fushigi Dagashiya Zenitendō: Tsuritai Yaki	Screenplay	

=== Web Anime ===
Year	Title	Credit	Note
2014	Pretty Guardian Sailor Moon Crystal Season I	Series Composition, Script (eps. 1–3, 6, 8, 10, 12, 14)	Dark Kingdom arc
2015	Pretty Guardian Sailor Moon Crystal Season II	Series Composition, Script (eps. 2, 4, 6–9, 11–12)	Black Moon arc

== Bibliography ==
=== Novel ===
- Yūji Kobayashi (October 4, 2016). Smile PreCure! 小説 スマイルプリキュア! [Novel: Smile PreCure!] (in Japanese). Kodansha. ISBN 978-4-06-314878-7.

=== Manga ===
Year	Title	Credit	Note
2012	Space Sheriff Gavan	Story	
