= Ultraman Zero: The Chronicle =

- Poster
- Genre: Superhero; Tokusatsu; Sci-Fi; Kaiju; Kyodai Hero
- Created by: Tsuburaya Productions
- Starring: Mamoru Miyano
- Country of origin: Japan
- No. of episodes: 25

Production
- Running time: 24–25 mins. (per episode)

Original release
- Network: TV Tokyo; BS Japan
- Release: January 7 – June 24, 2017

Related
- Ultraman Retsuden; Ultraman the Prime

Ultraman Zero: The Chronicle (ウルトラマンゼロ THE CHRONICLE, Urutoraman Zero Za Kuronikuru) is a biography series produced by Tsuburaya Productions created to commemorate the 50th anniversary of Ultra Seven. This show follows a format similar to Ultraman Retsuden, and continues to feature Ultraman Zero as the show's main navigator, bringing the viewers to movies and miniseries that featured his major involvement. Before its official airing in 2017 in Japan, it was shown in Malaysian television channel Astro Ceria starting from April 10, 2015 in Malay.

The show was broadcast starting January 7, 2017 on two Japanese television networks, TV Tokyo and BS Japan at the time of 9:00 am and 5:00 pm respectively. The official website also announced the launch of Ultra Fight Orb, a spinoff of Ultraman Orb which was released in spring 2017.

On July 25, 2017, Toku announced that the series would air in the United States on its channel with English subtitles beginning August 31, 2017.

The show's main catchphrase is "It's a fighting chronicle" (それは、激闘の年代記(─クロニクル─)。, Sore wa, gekitō no kuronikuru).

== Characters ==
- Ultraman Zero (ウルトラマンゼロ, Urutoraman Zero): The series' main navigator.

=== Devices ===
- Orb Ring (オーブリング, Ōbu Ringu, 1): Ultraman Orb's transformation device, which made a cameo appearance in the first episode, triggering the announcement "special!" when scanning a peculiar card featuring both Zero and Orb Origin himself.
- Ultra Pad Neo (ウルトラPAD NEO, Urutora Paddo Neo, 2-5): A tablet-like device that featured each character's viewpoint, foreshadowing the next episode itself.

== Episodes ==
1. Ultraman Zero: Bonds With Friends! (ウルトラマンゼロ 仲間との絆！, Urutoraman Zero Nakama to no Kizuna!)
2. Ultraman Zero: The Revenge of Belial: Chapter of Bonds (ウルトラマンゼロ THE MOVIE 超決戦!ベリアル銀河帝国 絆の章, Urutoraman Zero Za Mūbī Chōkessen! Beriaru Ginga Teikoku Kizuna no Shō)
3. Ultraman Zero: The Revenge of Belial: Chapter of Fire (ウルトラマンゼロ THE MOVIE 超決戦!ベリアル銀河帝国 炎の章, Urutoraman Zero Za Mūbī Chōkessen! Beriaru Ginga Teikoku Honō no Shō)
4. Ultraman Zero: The Revenge of Belial: Chapter of Mirror (ウルトラマンゼロ THE MOVIE 超決戦!ベリアル銀河帝国 鏡の章, Urutoraman Zero Za Mūbī Chōkessen! Beriaru Ginga Teikoku Kagami no Shō)
5. Ultraman Zero: The Revenge of Belial: Chapter of Steel (ウルトラマンゼロ THE MOVIE 超決戦!ベリアル銀河帝国 鋼の章, Urutoraman Zero Za Mūbī Chōkessen! Beriaru Ginga Teikoku Hagane no Shō)
6. Ultraman Zero: The Revenge of Belial: Chapter of Light (ウルトラマンゼロ THE MOVIE 超決戦!ベリアル銀河帝国 光の章, Urutoraman Zero Za Mūbī Chōkessen! Beriaru Ginga Teikoku Hikari no Shō)
7. Mega Monster Battle: Ultra Galaxy Chapter 1: The Rebellion of Belial (大怪獣バトル ウルトラ銀河伝説 -第1章-「反逆のベリアル」, Daikaijū Batoru Urutora Ginga Densetsu Dai Isshō Hangyaku no Beriaru)
8. Mega Monster Battle: Ultra Galaxy Chapter 2: Rei and Mebius (大怪獣バトル ウルトラ銀河伝説 -第2章-「レイとメビウス」, Daikaijū Batoru Urutora Ginga Densetsu Dai Nishō Rei to Mebiusu)
9. Mega Monster Battle: Ultra Galaxy Chapter 3: Decisive Battle in the Monster Graveyard (大怪獣バトル ウルトラ銀河伝説 -第3章-「怪獣墓場の決戦」, Daikaijū Batoru Urutora Ginga Densetsu Dai Sanshō Kaijū Hakaba no Kessen)
10. Mega Monster Battle: Ultra Galaxy Chapter 4: Ultraman Zero Has Arrived (大怪獣バトル ウルトラ銀河伝説 -第4章-「ウルトラマンゼロ参上」, Daikaijū Batoru Urutora Ginga Densetsu Dai Yonshō Urutoraman Zero Sanjō)
11. Mega Monster Battle: Ultra Galaxy Final Chapter: Revive the Light of the Galaxy (大怪獣バトル ウルトラ銀河伝説 -最終章-「よみがえれ 銀河の光」, Daikaijū Batoru Urutora Ginga Densetsu Saishū-shō Yomigaere Ginga no Hikari)
12. Ultraman Zero vs. Darklops Zero Part 1: Multi-dimensional Threat! (ウルトラマンゼロVSダークロプスゼロ パート① 多次元の脅威!, Urutoraman Zero Bui Esu Dākuropusu Zero Pāto Wan Tajigen no Kyōi!)
13. Ultraman Zero vs. Darklops Zero Part 2: Dark Magic Bomb! (ウルトラマンゼロVSダークロプスゼロ パート② 暗黒の魔弾!, Urutoraman Zero Bui Esu Dākuropusu Zero Pāto Tsū Ankoku no Madan!)
14. Ultraman Zero vs. Darklops Zero Part 3: Big Bang of Fire! (ウルトラマンゼロVSダークロプスゼロ パート③ 炎のビッグバン!, Urutoraman Zero Bui Esu Dākuropusu Zero Pāto Surī Honō no Biggu Ban!)
15. Killer the Beatstar Part 1: The Steel Army (キラーザビートスター パート① 鋼鉄の軍団, Kirā Za Bītosutā Pāto Wan Kōtetsu no Gundan)
16. Killer the Beatstar Part 2: The Steel Dictator (キラーザビートスター パート② 鋼の独裁者, Kirā Za Bītosutā Pāto Tsū Hagane no Dokusai-sha)
17. Killer the Beatstar Part 3: The Steel Tears (キラーザビートスター パート③ 鋼鉄の涙, Kirā Za Bītosutā Pāto Surī Kōtetsu no Namida)
18. Ultraman Saga Chapter 1: The Silent Earth (ウルトラマンサーガ 第1章「沈黙の地球」, Urutoraman Sāga Dai Isshō Chinmoku no Chikyū)
19. Ultraman Saga Chapter 2: Zero's Hardship (ウルトラマンサーガ 第2章「ゼロの苦難」, Urutoraman Sāga Dai Nishō Zero no Kunan)
20. Ultraman Saga Chapter 3: The Cocoon of Fear (ウルトラマンサーガ 第3章「恐怖の繭」, Urutoraman Sāga Dai Sanshō Kyōfu no Mayu)
21. Ultraman Saga Chapter 4: The Revival Hero (ウルトラマンサーガ 第4章「復活の英雄」, Urutoraman Sāga Dai Yonshō Fukkatsu no Eiyū)
22. Ultraman Saga Chapter 5: The True Fight (ウルトラマンサーガ 第5章「本当の戦い」, Urutoraman Sāga Dai Goshō Hontō no Tatakai)
23. Ultra Zero Fight: A New Power (ウルトラゼロファイト 新たなる力, Urutora Zero Faito Aratanaru Chikara)
24. Ultra Zero Fight: Shining Zero Part 1 (ウルトラゼロファイト 輝きのゼロ 前編, Urutora Zero Faito Kagayaki no Zero Zenpen)
25. Ultra Zero Fight: Shining Zero Part 2 (ウルトラゼロファイト 輝きのゼロ 後編, Urutora Zero Faito Kagayaki no Zero Kōhen)

== Ultra Heroes Chronicle ==
As a countdown to the film Ultraman Orb The Movie, Ultra Heroes Chronicle (ウルトラヒーローズクロニクル, Urutora Hīrōzu Kuronikuru) aired during the ending segment of episodes 7-11 of the show. Ultraman Zero navigates the viewers to the four Ultra Warriors who are featured in the film.

1. Ultraman Ginga (ウルトラマンギンガ, Urutoraman Ginga): during episode 7.
2. Ultraman Victory (ウルトラマンビクトリー, Urutoraman Bikutorī): during episode 8.
3. Ultraman X (ウルトラマンエックス, Urutoraman Ekkusu): during episode 9.
4. Ultraman Orb (ウルトラマンオーブ, Urutoraman Ōbu): during episodes 10 and 11.

== Ultra Fight Orb ==
Ultra Fight Orb (ウルトラファイトオーブ, Urutora Faito Ōbu) aired during the ending segment of episodes 15-22 of the show and features two new forms of Ultraman Orb.

== Cast ==
- Ultraman Zero (Voice): Mamoru Miyano (宮野 真守, Miyano Mamoru)
- Orb Ring Voice (1): Takahiro Sakurai (櫻井 孝宏, Sakurai Takahiro)
- Rei (レイ, 7-11): Shota Minami (南 翔太, Minami Shōta)
- Hyuga (ヒュウガ, Hyūga, Voice; 13, 14): Hiroyuki Konishi (小西 博之, Konishi Hiroyuki)
- Mirror Knight (ミラーナイト, Mirā Naito, Voice; 15-17): Hikaru Midorikawa (緑川 光, Midorikawa Hikaru)
- Glenfire (グレンファイヤー, Gurenfaiyā, Voice; 15-17): Tomokazu Seki (関 智一, Seki Tomokazu)
- Jean-Bot (ジャンボット, Jan Botto, Voice; 15): Hiroshi Kamiya (神谷 浩史, Kamiya Hiroshi)
- Narration: Koji Ishizaka (石坂 浩二, Ishizaka Kōji, 2-6), Masaaki Yajima (矢島 正明, Yajima Masaaki, 8)

== Song ==
- "GO AHEAD ~Susume! Ultraman Zero~" (GO AHEAD ~すすめ! ウルトラマンゼロ~, Gō Aheddo ~Susume! Urutoraman Zero~, "Go Ahead ~Let's Go! Ultraman Zero~")
  - Lyrics: Keizo Nakanishi (中西 圭三, Nakanishi Keizō)
  - Composition & Arrangement: Takao Konishi (小西 貴雄, Konishi Takao)
  - Artist: Ichirou Mizuki (水木 一郎, Mizuki Ichirō) with Voyager (ボイジャー, Boijā)
