= Ultraman X =

2015 Japanese TV series

- Title card
- Genre: Superhero; Tokusatsu; Science fiction Kaiju; Kyodai Hero
- Written by: Yūji Kobayashi; Hirotoshi Kobayashi; Takao Nakano; Hisako Kurosawa; Ryo Ikeda; Sotaro Hayashi; Sachio Yanai; Hiroki Uchida; Akio Miyoshi; Junichiro Ashiki; Kyoko Katsuya; Uiko Miura
- Directed by: Kiyotaka Taguchi; Koichi Sakamoto; Takanori Tsujimoto; Yusuke Murakami; Yuichi Abe; Suguru Tomita
- Starring: Kensuke Takahashi; Akane Sakanoue; Yoshihiko Hosoda; Ukyo Matsumoto; Hayato Harada; Haruka Momokawa; TAKERU; Chiaki Seshimo; Sarara Tsukifume; Yuu Kamio
- Composer: Takao Konishi
- Country of origin: Japan
- Original language: Japanese
- No. of episodes: 22 (+3 recaps)

Production
- Producer: Eiji Kikuchi
- Running time: 30 mins
- Production company: Tsuburaya Productions

Original release
- Network: TXN (TV Tokyo)
- Release: July 14 – December 22, 2015

Related
- Ultraman Ginga S; Ultraman Orb

Ultraman X (ウルトラマンX, Urutoraman Ekkusu) is a Japanese television series produced by Tsuburaya Productions. It is the 19th entry (28th overall) in the Ultra Series and is currently the last series to air as part of the New Ultraman Retsuden programming block on TV Tokyo. On July 13 Crunchyroll announced it would be simulcast in North America on their site and app, making it the first tokusatsu show in the world to be simulcast while airing in Japan.

== Story ==
Ultraman X, the series' titular hero, sporting a pair of headphone-shaped ears and an X-shaped Color Timer.ultraman x

A solar flare called the Ultra Flare (ウルトラフレア, Urutora Furea) has awakened mysterious OOPArts known as Spark Dolls from the depths of the earth and the ocean, materializing them into rampaging monsters that terrorize the Earth. Due to this, UNVER was formed to gather, collect and secure unstable Spark Dolls and a new attack team was formed, Xio to combat monster threats.

Fifteen years later, Daichi Ozora, a member of Xio's Lab Team who was orphaned when his parents got lost in the Ultra Flare, bonds and transforms into Ultraman X to battle threats from both aliens and monsters. He soon learns of the truth behind Ultra Flare and resolves to help Ultraman X to regain his physical body after the incident had trapped him in the form of computer data.

In the middle of the series, Daichi learns how to properly summon a Cyber Monster and thus, bringing forth Cyber Gomora, a monster modelled after his childhood Spark Doll, Gomora, becoming one of Xio's new allies and an alternative for Daichi whenever X is unable to fight. At the same time a strange energy source dubbed by Xio as Dark Thunder Energy (ダークサンダーエナジー, Dāku Sandā Enajī) frequently appears and turns ordinary monsters into berserks. Because the energy's effect also weakens X, it nearly killed him during his fight with Tsurugi Demaaga, the first victim of Dark Thunder Energy. To counter this, a new weapon was discovered by Daichi, the X-Lugger, which allows X to become Ultraman Exceed X and use the weapon to purify monsters from Dark Thunder Energy. In accordance to an alien named Dada, humanity is on the verge of extinction from the effect of Dark Thunder Energy's assault.

At the end of the series, the mastermind behind the Ultra Flare and Dark Thunder Energy appeared, namely Greeza. Having destroyed three planets in the past, it was thought to be killed after X banished it to the sun but instead survived and had journeyed through Mercury and Venus within 18 days. Now having arrived on Earth, Greeza sought to absorb the Spark Dolls to achieve its strongest evolution and X revealed himself to Xio members, seeking cooperation to defend their supply of Spark Dolls from Greeza. In the end, X and Daichi seemingly died after performing a kamikaze attack but Greeza survived its destruction and successfully absorbs Xio's Spark Dolls, finally achieving its final evolution. It wasn't until Asuna managed to bring Daichi back to the real world and X revived, with both managing to pursue the captured Spark Dolls to escape and merged with the Ultra to finish Greeza. Although the destroyer is killed, X however has yet to regain his true body, while continuing his service in Xio.

== Episodes ==
No.	Title	Written by	Original release date
1	"Voice from the Starry Sky"; Transliteration: "Hoshizora no Koe" (Japanese: 星空の声)	Yūji Kobayashi	July 14, 2015
2	"A Collection of Possibilities"; Transliteration: "Kanōsei no Katamari" (Japanese: 可能性のかたまり)	Hirotoshi Kobayashi	July 21, 2015
3	"A Song That Calls the Night"; Transliteration: "Yoru o Yobu Uta" (Japanese: 夜を呼ぶ歌)	Takao Nakano	July 28, 2015
4	"All for One"; Transliteration: "Ōru Fō Wan" (Japanese: オール・フォー・ワン)	Hisako Kurosawa	August 4, 2015
5	"When the Aegis Shines"; Transliteration: "Ījisu Hikaru Toki" (Japanese: イージス 光る時)	Takao Nakano	August 11, 2015
6	"The Man With the Memories of a Planet"; Transliteration: "Hoshi no Kioku o Motsu Otoko" (Japanese: 星の記憶を持つ男)	Hirotoshi Kobayashi	August 18, 2015
7	"An Oath Beyond Stars"; Transliteration: "Hoshi o Koeta Chikai" (Japanese: 星を越えた誓い)	Yūji Kobayashi	August 25, 2015
R1	"Encounters and Friends"; Transliteration: "Deai Soshite Nakama-tachi" (Japanese: 出会い そして仲間たち)	Ryo Ikeda	September 1, 2015
8	"X in Peril"; Transliteration: "Nerawareta Ekkusu" (Japanese: 狙われたX)	Sotaro Hayashi	September 8, 2015
9	"We Are Nebula!"; Transliteration: "Ware-ra Seiun!" (Japanese: 我ら星雲！)	Takao Nakano	September 15, 2015
10	"The Monster Won't Move"; Transliteration: "Kaijū wa Ugokanai" (Japanese: 怪獣は動かない)	Sachio Yanai	September 22, 2015
11	"An Unknown Friend"; Transliteration: "Michi-naru Yūjin" (Japanese: 未知なる友人)	Yūji Kobayashi	September 29, 2015
12	"End of the Rainbow"; Transliteration: "Niji no Yuku Saki" (Japanese: 虹の行く先)	Hiroki Uchida	October 6, 2015
13	"Sword of Victory"; Transliteration: "Shōri no Tsurugi" (Japanese: 勝利の剣)	Akio Miyoshi	October 13, 2015
14	"The Shining Sky, and the Land Beneath It"; Transliteration: "Hikaru Ōzora Tsunagaru Daichi" (Japanese: 光る大空・繋がる大地)	Sotaro Hayashi	October 20, 2015
R2	"The Light of Victory Which Exceeds All Limites"; Transliteration: "Genkai o Koeta Shōri no Hikari" (Japanese: 限界を超えた勝利の光)	Junichiro Ashiki	October 27, 2015
15	"A Soldier's Back"; Transliteration: "Senshi no Senaka" (Japanese: 戦士の背中)	Hisako Kurosawa	November 3, 2015
16	"Feature Report! 24 Hours Inside Xio"; Transliteration: "Gekisatsu! Xio Mitchaku Nijū-yo-ji" (Japanese: 激撮！Xio密着24時)	Takao Nakano	November 10, 2015
17	"My Friend's a Monster"; Transliteration: "Tomodachi wa Kaijū" (Japanese: ともだちは怪獣)	Kyoko Katsuya	November 17, 2015
18	"Wataru's Romance"; Transliteration: "Wataru no Koi" (Japanese: ワタルの恋)	Hisako Kurosawa	November 24, 2015
19	"Living Together"; Transliteration: "Tomo ni Ikiru" (Japanese: 共に生きる)	Uiko Miura	December 1, 2015
20	"Bond -Unite-"; Transliteration: "Kizuna -Yunaito-" (Japanese: 絆 -Unite-)	Hirotoshi Kobayashi	December 8, 2015
21	"A Beautiful End"; Transliteration: "Utsukushiki Shūen" (Japanese: 美しき終焉)	Hirotoshi Kobayashi	December 15, 2015
22	"The Rainbow Land"; Transliteration: "Niji no Daichi" (Japanese: 虹の大地)	Yūji Kobayashi	December 22, 2015
R3	"A World United as One"; Transliteration: "Kizuna de Hitotsu ni Naru Sekai" (Japanese: 絆でひとつになる世界)	Junichiro Ashiki	January 5, 2016

== Other media ==
=== Films and team-up ===
- Ultraman X The Movie had premiered on March 12, 2016, in celebration of the 50th anniversary of Ultraman and the Ultra Series. The project was announced by Tsuburaya Productions on July 23, 2015, and in Ultraman Festival 2015. On November 28, 2015, the title and the film poster were announced in Tsuburaya Productions' blog.
- Ultraman Orb The Movie (2017), X with his human host Daichi Ozora teams up with Ultraseven, Zero, Ginga, Victory and Orb in this movie. This film is a prequel to the Ultraman Orb Chronicle Chapter 8 "Super Sky Great Evil Beast Desastro" story arc.
- Ultra Galaxy Fight (2019, 2022):
- Ultraman Taiga The Movie (2020): See here

== Cast ==
- Daichi Ozora (大空 大地, Ōzora Daichi): Kensuke Takahashi (高橋 健介, Takahashi Kensuke)
- Asuna Yamase (山瀬 アスナ, Yamase Asuna): Akane Sakanoue (坂ノ上 茜, Sakanoue Akane)
- Wataru Kazama (風間 ワタル, Kazama Wataru): Yoshihiko Hosoda (細田 よしひこ, Hosoda Yoshihiko)
- Hayato Kishima (貴島 ハヤト, Kishima Hayato): Ukyo Matsumoto (松本 享恭, Matsumoto Ukyō)
- Mamoru Mikazuki (三日月 マモル, Mikazuki Mamoru): Hayato Harada (原田 隼人, Harada Hayato)
- Rui Takada (高田 ルイ, Takada Rui): Haruka Momokawa (百川 晴香, Momokawa Haruka)
- Takeru Yamagishi (山岸 タケル, Yamagishi Takeru): TAKERU
- Chiaki Matsudo (松戸 チアキ, Matsudo Chiaki): Chiaki Seshimo (瀬下 千晶, Seshimo Chiaki)
- Sayuri Tachibana (橘 さゆり, Tachibana Sayuri): Sarara Tsukifune (月船 さらら, Tsukifune Sarara)
- Shotaro Kamiki (神木 正太郎, Kamiki Shōtarō): Yuu Kamio (神尾 佑, Kamio Yū)

=== Voice cast ===
- Ultraman X: Yuichi Nakamura (中村 悠一, Nakamura Yuichi)
- Alien Fanton "Gourman" (ファントン星人グルマン, Fanton Seijin Guruman), Narrator: Yasunori Matsumoto (松本 保典, Matsumoto Yasunori)
- X Devizer (エクスデバイザー, Ekusu Debaizā), Navigation, Announcement: Hibiku Yamamura (山村 響, Yamamura Hibiku)

=== Guest cast ===
- Takashi Ozora (大空 鷹志, Ōzora Takashi; 1–2): Yūrei Yanagi (柳 憂怜, Yanagi Yūrei)
- Underground Woman (地底女, Chitei Onna; 3): Hinako Saeki (佐伯 日菜子, Saeki Hinako)
- Alien Gold "tE-rU" (ゴールド星人tE・rU, Gōrudo Seijin Teru; 6–7): Masaya Kikawada (黄川田 将也, Kikawada Masaya)
- Daisuke Minamikawa (南川 大輔, Minamikawa Daisuke; 6–7): Koichi Miura (三浦 浩一, Miura Kōichi)
- Kaito Touma (トウマ・カイト, Tōma Kaito; 8)/Ultraman Max (ウルトラマンマックス, Urutoraman Makkusu; Voice): Sota Aoyama (青山 草太, Aoyama Sōta)
- Yamato Suda (須田 大和, Suda Yamato; 10): Yu Tokui (徳井 優, Tokui Yū)
- Chizuru Ueki (植木 千鶴, Ueki Chizuru; 10): Misato Hirata (平田 弥里, Hirata Misato)
- Atsuyuki Kusano (草野 敦之, Kusano Atsuyuki; 10): Tadashi Mizuno (水野 直, Mizuno Tadashi)
- Phantom Space Queen Gina Spectre (幻影宇宙女王 ギナ・スペクター, Gen'ei Uchū Joō Gina Supekutā; 12-14): Minami Tsukui (佃井 皆美, Tsukui Minami)
- Hikaru Raido (礼堂 ヒカル, Raidō Hikaru; 13–14)/Ultraman Ginga (ウルトラマンギンガ, Urutoraman Ginga; Voice): Takuya Negishi (根岸 拓哉, Negishi Takuya)
- Sho (ショウ, Shō; 13–14)/Ultraman Victory (ウルトラマンビクトリー, Urutoraman Bikutorī; Voice): Kiyotaka Uji (宇治 清高, Uji Kiyotaka)
- Arisa Sugita (杉田 アリサ, Sugita Arisa; 13–14): Yukari Taki (滝 裕可里, Taki Yukari)
- Hiromi Kamiki (神木 裕美, Kamiki Hiromi; 15): Kaoru Hirata (平田 薫, Hirata Kaoru)
- Michiru Tachibana (橘 みちる, Tachibana Michiru; 16, 20): Sora Tamaki (田牧 そら, Tamaki Sora).
- Kaori Aizawa (相沢 かおり, Aizawa Kaori; 17): Kumiko Endo (遠藤 久美子, Endō Kumiko)
- Nanako (菜々子; 18): Chihiro Otsuka (大塚 千弘, Ōtsuka Chihiro)
- Shogo Tachibana (橘 祥吾, Tachibana Shōgo; 20): Takuji Kawakubo (川久保 拓司, Kawakubo Takuji)

== Songs ==
Opening theme

- "Ultraman X" (ウルトラマンX, Urutoraman Ekkusu)
  - Lyrics: Masato Ochi (おち まさと, Ochi Masato)
  - Composition & Arrangement: Takao Konishi (小西 貴雄, Konishi Takao)
  - Artist: Voyager feat. Daichi Ozora (Kensuke Takahashi)

Ending theme

- Unite ~Kimi to Tsunagaru Tame ni~ (Unite ～君とつながるために～; "Unite ~To Unite With You~")
  - Lyrics: TAKERU, Chiaki Seshimo
  - Composition & Arrangement: Takao Konishi
  - Artist: Voyager

Insert theme

- "Susume! Ultraman Zero" (すすめ! ウルトラマンゼロ, Susume! Urutoraman Zero; "Let's Go! Ultraman Zero")
  - Lyrics: Hideki Tama (田靡 秀樹, Tama Hideki), Tomohiro Yamaguchi (山口 智大, Yamaguchi Tomohiro)
  - Composition & Arrangement: Takao Konishi
  - Artist: Voyager
  - Episodes: 5
- "Ultraman Victory no Uta" (ウルトラマンビクトリーの歌, Urutoraman Bikutorī no Uta; "The Song of Ultraman Victory")
  - Lyrics: Sei Okazaki (岡崎 聖, Okazaki Sei)
  - Composition & Arrangement: Takao Konishi
  - Artist: Voyager
  - Episodes: 13
- "Ultraman Ginga no Uta" (ウルトラマンギンガの歌, Urutoraman Giga no Uta; "The Song of Ultraman Ginga")
  - Lyrics: Hideki Tama, Sei Okazaki
  - Composition & Arrangement: Takao Konishi
  - Artist: Voyager with Chisa (千紗) (Girl Next Door), Maria Haruna (マリア春菜), Hiroaki Takeuchi (竹内 浩明, Takeuchi Hiroaki), Hikaru (Takuya Negishi), Misuzu (Mio Miyatake), Kenta (Mizuki Ohno), Chigusa (Kirara), Tomoya (Takuya Kusakawa)
  - Episodes: 13–14, Recap 2
- "Ultraman Max" (ウルトラマンマックス, Urutoraman Makkusu)
  - Lyrics: Neko Oikawa (及川 眠子, Oikawa Neko)
  - Composition & Arrangement: Yasuharu Takanashi (高梨 康治, Takanashi Yasuharu)
  - Artist: TEAM DASH with Project DMM
  - Episodes: Recap 2
- "NO LIMITED"
  - Lyrics, Composition, & Arrangement: Kazuya Daimon (大門 一也, Daimon Kazuya)
  - Artist: Project DMM
  - Episodes: Recap 2
- "Eiyū no Uta" (英雄の詩; "The Song of Hero")
  - Lyrics & Composition: Toshihiko Takamizawa (高見沢 俊彦, Takamizawa Toshihiko)
  - Arrangement: Toshihiko Takamizawa with Yuichiro Honda (本田 優一郎, Honda Yūichirō)
  - Artist: The Alfee
  - Episodes: Recap 2

== See also ==
- Ultra Series - Complete list of official Ultraman-related shows.
