= Red Account: My Bloody Angel =

- Directed by: Toshiki Satô
- Written by: Takao Nakano; Toshiki Satô
- Release date: 18 May 1988
- Country: Japan
- Language: Japanese

Red Account: My Bloody Angel (赤い報告書 鮮血の天使, Akai Hokokusho: Senketsu no Tenshi) is a 1988 Japanese horror film directed by Toshiki Satô.
