= Ultraman Orb =

Japanese TV series

- Title card
- Genre: Superhero; Tokusatsu; Kaiju; Science fiction Kyodai Hero
- Written by: Takao Nakano; Yūji Kobayashi; Sotaro Hayashi; Akio Miyoshi; Hirotoshi Kobayashi; Hisako Kurosawa; Junichiro Ashiki; Uiko Miura; Daiki Seto; Hiroki Uchida; Sachio Yanai; Kyoko Katsuya; Shuji Yuki
- Directed by: Kiyotaka Taguchi; Yuichi Abe; Ryuichi Ichino; Suguru Tomita; Masayoshi Takesue
- Starring: Hideo Ishiguro; Miyabi Matsuura; Naoto Takahashi; Hiroaki Nerio; Takaya Aoyagi; Shingo Yanagisawa
- Opening theme: "Orb no Inori" by Ichiro Mizuki with Voyager
- Ending theme: "Shine your ORB" by Voyager feat. Gai Kurenai and SSP
- Composer: Takao Konishi
- Country of origin: Japan
- Original language: Japanese
- No. of episodes: 25

Production
- Producers: Yukinobu Tsuruta; Yoshino Aya (TV Tokyo); Lisa Takeba
- Running time: 24–25 min. (per episode)
- Production companies: Tsuburaya Productions; TV Tokyo; Dentsu

Original release
- Network: TXN (TV Tokyo)
- Release: July 9 (Note: July 9, 2016 is exactly 50 years after Birth of Ultraman (ウルトラマン誕生, Urutoraman Tanjō), the pre-premiere special of Ultraman which was recorded on July 9, 1966 and later aired on Tokyo Broadcasting System (the Ultra Series' original network before TV Tokyo) the next day in 7:00 pm.) – December 24, 2016

Related
- Ultraman X; Ultraman Orb: The Origin Saga

Ultraman Orb (ウルトラマンオーブ, Urutoraman Ōbu) is a Japanese tokusatsu television series produced by Tsuburaya Productions and broadcast on TV Tokyo. It is the 20th entry (29th overall) in the Ultra Series and released to commemorate its 50th anniversary of the Ultra Series and is the first since Ultra Galaxy Mega Monster Battle: Never Ending Odyssey not to be a part of Ultraman Retsuden/New Ultraman Retsuden. Similar to its preceding series, Ultraman X, Orb is also simulcasted in North America via Crunchyroll. The series was also released on Toku on July 2, 2018, and then added to its streaming platform the following month.

The show's main catchphrases are "Let me borrow the power of light!" (光の力、おかりします！, Hikari no chikara, okarishimasu!) and "Awaken, the warrior of light." (覚醒せよ、光の戦士。, Kakusei seyo, hikari no senshi.).

== Story ==
Ultraman Orb, the series' titular character, in Spacium Zeperion, which bears elements from Ultraman and Ultraman Tiga.

A long time ago, Earth was on the brink of destruction after Lord Monsters wreaked havoc, but the monsters were sealed with the help of Ultra Warriors.

In the present day, these monsters were unsealed by Jugglus Juggler as cases of monster attacks started to appear in Japan. During Maga-Basser's attack, Gai made his debut by saving Naomi, the leader of the paranormal website SSP and started his mission to stop the resurrection of Lord Monsters while taking refuge in the SSP's office. Unknown to the others, Gai secretly transforms into Ultraman Orb, a warrior of light who borrows the power of past Ultra Warriors upon losing his original form to fight against frequent monster attacks while facing Juggler, his original ally turned adversary after being rejected to be chosen for Orb's power. In the middle of the series, Juggler awakened the legendary monster Maga-Orochi who surpasses Orb in every one of his available forms. Through the use of Zoffy and Ultraman Belial's powers as Thunder Breastar, Gai/Orb managed to defeat the infamous destroyer but his little control of its immense power almost killed Naomi when she was captured by Galactron. After learning to have faith in his strength, Gai manages to control Thunder Breastar and regains his lost form, Orb Origin.

At the end of the series, it was revealed that Maga-Orochi survived and matured into its original form Magatano-Orochi. Its awakening was sensed by various monsters and aliens on Earth, with several of them already having left Japan and caused an unstable change of climate. Juggler tricked the VTL Squad into launching their strongest missile, which unintentionally helped the monster in its revival while proceeding to consume the entire planet. Following Orb's defeat, he took this opportunity to taunt Gai by attempting to kill Naomi in front of him but failed to do so when she claimed responsibility of her own death. Juggler's action of saving Naomi brings forth a revelation that he had rescued her ancestor Natasha during the year 1908, allowing him to be redeemed in front of his own rival Gai. When assisting Orb in facing Magatano-Orochi, Juggler held off the monster long enough for the Ultra to use his predecessor's powers and destroy it. In the aftermath of the battle, Gai decided to depart on his travel once more while Juggler survived his apparent destruction and watched the former's departure from a safe distance.

== Episodes ==
| No. | Title (Note: English titles are taken from Crunchyroll. "King Demon Beast" that Crunchyroll used is replaced with "Lord Monster", the official translation of Maō-jū (魔王獣).) | Written by | Original release date |
|---|---|---|---|
| SP | "Ultraman Orb Preview Special"; Transliteration: "Urutoraman Ōbu Chokuzen Supesharu" (Japanese: ウルトラマンオーブ直前スペシャル) | Junichiro Ashiki | July 2, 2016 |
| 1 | "The Sunset Wanderer"; Transliteration: "Yūhi no Fūraibō" (Japanese: 夕陽の風来坊) | Takao Nakano | July 9, 2016 |
| 2 | "The Lord of Earth (Note: The initial title is "The Earthen King Demon", as stated from this episode's preview in Crunchyroll's subtitle. Ironically, the new title features the word "Beast", despite the Japanese kanji for "beast" (獣, jū) is nowhere to be seen.)" Transliteration: "Tsuchikure no Maō" (Japanese: 土塊(つちくれ)の魔王) | Yuji Kobayashi | July 16, 2016 |
| 3 | "Monstrous Waters"; Transliteration: "Kaijū Suiiki" (Japanese: 怪獣水域) | Sotaro Hayashi | July 23, 2016 |
| 4 | "Beware of Fire in the Midsummer Sky"; Transliteration: "Manatsu no Sora ni Hinoyōjin" (Japanese: 真夏の空に火の用心) | Akio Miyoshi | July 30, 2016 |
| 5 | "A Heart That Won't Run Away"; Transliteration: "Nigenai Kokoro" (Japanese: 逃げない心) | Hirotoshi Kobayashi | August 6, 2016 |
| 6 | "The Forbidden Forest"; Transliteration: "Hairazu no Mori" (Japanese: 入らずの森) | Takao Nakano | August 13, 2016 |
| 7 | "A Future Shrouded in Fog"; Transliteration: "Kiri no Naka no Ashita" (Japanese: 霧の中の明日) | Yuji Kobayashi | August 20, 2016 |
| 8 | "The Urban Merman"; Transliteration: "Tokai no Hangyojin" (Japanese: 都会の半魚人) | Hirotoshi Kobayashi | August 27, 2016 |
| 9 | "The Impostor Blues"; Transliteration: "Nisemono no Burūsu" (Japanese: ニセモノのブルース) | Takao Nakano | September 3, 2016 |
| 10 | "Juggler Dies!"; Transliteration: "Jagurā Shisu!" (Japanese: ジャグラー死す！) | Yuji Kobayashi | September 10, 2016 |
| 11 | "Trouble! Mama Is Here!"; Transliteration: "Taihen! Mama ga Kita!" (Japanese: 大変！ママが来た！) | Hisako Kurosawa | September 17, 2016 |
| 12 | "The Dark King's Blessing"; Transliteration: "Kuroki Ō no Shukufuku" (Japanese: 黒き王の祝福) | Hisako Kurosawa | September 24, 2016 |
| 13 | "Cleanup of the Heart"; Transliteration: "Kokoro no Ōsōji" (Japanese: 心の大掃除) | Junichiro Ashiki | October 1, 2016 |
| 14 | "Justice Out of Control"; Transliteration: "Bōsō Suru Seigi" (Japanese: 暴走する正義) | Sotaro Hayashi | October 8, 2016 |
| 15 | "Never Say Never"; Transliteration: "Nebā Sei Nebā" (Japanese: ネバー・セイ・ネバー) | Hirotoshi Kobayashi | October 15, 2016 |
| 16 | "A Unforgettable Place"; Transliteration: "Wasurerarenai Basho" (Japanese: 忘れられない場所) | Uiko Miura | October 22, 2016 |
| 17 | "The Holy Sword, Restored"; Transliteration: "Fukkatsu no Seiken" (Japanese: 復活の聖剣) | Yuji Kobayashi | October 29, 2016 |
| 18 | "Hard-Boiled River"; Transliteration: "Hādoboirudo Ribā" (Japanese: ハードボイルドリバー) | Daiki Seto | November 5, 2016 |
| 19 | "The Demon Inside of Me"; Transliteration: "Watashi no Naka no Oni" (Japanese: 私の中の鬼) | Uiko Miura | November 12, 2016 |
| 20 | "Revenge's Trigger"; Transliteration: "Fukushū no Hikigane" (Japanese: 復讐の引き金) | Hiroki Uchida | November 19, 2016 |
| 21 | "The Girl with the Blue Ribbon"; Transliteration: "Aoi Ribon no Shōjo" (Japanese: 青いリボンの少女) | Sachio Yanai | November 26, 2016 |
| 22 | "The Unmarked Café"; Transliteration: "Chizu ni Nai Kafe" (Japanese: 地図にないカフェ) | Kyoko Katsuya | December 3, 2016 |
| 23 | "The Blade of Darkness"; Transliteration: "Yami no Yaiba" (Japanese: 闇の刃) | Shuji Yuki | December 10, 2016 |
| 24 | "The Ultimate Lord Monster Strikes Back"; Transliteration: "Gyakushū no Chō Dai Maō-jū" (Japanese: 逆襲の超大魔王獣) | Yuji Kobayashi | December 17, 2016 |
| 25 | "The Wandering Sun"; Transliteration: "Sasurai no Taiyō" (Japanese: さすらいの太陽) | Takao Nakano | December 24, 2016 |

== Production ==
A mysterious Ultraman being previewed at the end of Tsuburaya's Ultraman 50th Anniversary promotional video

Prior to the conception of the series, a promotional video was made by Tsuburaya Productions released via YouTube on January 24, 2016 to celebrate the 50th anniversary of the Ultra Series, dating back to the first series, Ultra Q through Ultraman X. At the end of the video, a black background with a pair of Ultraman eyes can be seen, with the English letters "What's next...?" shown. On February 6, Field Corporation, the parent company of Tsuburaya Productions Co., Ltd., revealed in a financial presentation on February 1 that a new Ultraman series will premiere in July. However, the report did not reveal any other information about the new series.

On April 25, 2016, Japanese newspaper Sports Hochi announced and revealed the details of the new entry in the Ultra Series, Ultraman Orb. Kiyotaka Taguchi, who directed the previous year's Ultraman X series, was once again set to be the director, with Yuji Kobayashi and Takao Nakano returning as the series' writers. Taguchi stated that the series will have "themes of traveling the noble path and returning to one's roots, while still being a funny and interesting Ultraman series". Aside from celebrating the 50th anniversary of the Ultra Series, it also aims to attract the series' fans since the past years. This news was finally followed by Orb's appearance in episode 147 of New Ultraman Retsuden and a promotional video of the series, both launched on April 30, 2016.

In an interview for the Uchusen summer 2016 magazine, the "wandering protagonist" concept had long been in development since the last two Ultra Series, Ultraman Ginga S and Ultraman X. The original character conception for Gai Kurenai, the series' protagonist, was based on Dan Moroboshi/Ultraseven, the protagonist of the 1967 Ultra Series, Ultra Seven, with Takao Nakano including additional motives to the character. Additionally, Gai's concept was envisioned as a "What if?" variation should Dan never scouted to be recruited as a member of the Ultra Guard. According to Nakano, Gai's main rival, Jugglus Juggler is based on "a stereotypical worthy opponent to the wanderers". While developing the leading cast, Taguchi requested for the removal of any research department in the shows attack teams, instead opting to have the VTL Squad, the show's attack team, be portrayed as "ordinary street officers". The name of the antagonist kaiju, Lord Monsters (魔王獣, Maō-jū), was created to sound appealing to the child audience.

The Uchusen autumn 2016 revealed an interview with writers Yuji Kobayashi and Takao Nakano, the decision of having a protagonist as an Ultraman in disguise is to counter the elements of a bond between an Ultraman and human host that was portrayed in the last year series' Ultraman X. Under Taguchi's supervision, each episode was added with both the elements of light and seriousness. The original idea behind the SSP was to follow the example of Kogoro Akechi, the fictional character from Edogawa Ranpo's novel series, The Boy Detectives Club.

On July 14, Tsuburaya announced the release of team SSP's official website which focuses on their adventure with monsters in the series, as well as their meeting with Ultraman Orb.

=== Casting ===
When Sports Hochi newspaper first announced the new series, Ultraman Orb, Hideo Ishiguro was revealed to be the lead actor of the series, as the main protagonist Gai Kurenai. According to Hideo, he has been a fan of the Ultra Series since his childhood, but never expected to land a role on the series himself. Unlike the actors of recent Heisei era Ultra Series, Hideo is in fact an experienced actor instead of a rookie/newcomer actor.

The rest of the series' casts were later announced by the official Tsuburaya Productions website on May 26, 2016. On June 9, a press conference of the series was held at the Tokyo Toy Show 2016, with the attendance being the show's main cast and singers. Ichiro Mizuki collaborated with Voyager members TAKUYA and Chiaki Seshimo to perform the series' opening theme. At the same time, official websites for the series were given updates and another promotional video for the series was released. During the final stage greeting for Ultraman X The Movie, which was held as a sign of departure from the Ultraman X cast to their spectators, Ultraman Orb appeared as the guest of honor and was greeted by Kensuke Takahashi, Daichi Ozora's actor.

=== Reception ===
In a financial report revealed by Fields Corporation, viewing figures for the show's online streaming showcase a massive 89% increase from the previous series Ultraman X. As of episode 15, the show's worldwide streaming figures total is 480 million.

== Ultraman Orb Chronicle ==
In a stage greeting for Ultraman Orb The Movie, director Kiyotaka Taguchi announced then that he and writer Takao Nakano crafted the Ultraman Orb 10 Episode Plan (ウルトラマンオーブ エピソード10構想, Urutoraman Ōbu Episōdo Jū Kōsō). The production of further episodes depended on the success of the movie and asked everyone to support it.

After the release of Ultraman Orb Perfect Super Complete Works (ウルトラマンオーブ完全超全集, Urutoraman Ōbu Kanzen Chō Zenshū), the magazine unveiled further detail of said plan in pages 103 to 110 under the moniker Ultraman Orb Chronicle (ウルトラマンオーブクロニクル, Urutoraman Ōbu Kuronikuru):

Title
"Chapter 1 "Tree of Life" arc"
Transliteration: "Dai Isshō Inochi no Ki-hen" (Japanese: 第1章「命の木」編)
The first spin-off of Ultraman Orb titled Ultraman Orb: The Origin Saga (ウルトラマンオーブ THE ORIGIN SAGA, Urutoraman Ōbu Za Orijin Sāga), was published in the Japanese site of Amazon Prime. It features the beginning of the entire series on Gai's first transformation into Ultraman Orb, as well as his and Juggler's first mission.
"Chapter 2 "I am the Migration Bird of Galaxy" arc"
Transliteration: "Dai Ni-shō Ore wa Ginga no Wataridori-hen" (Japanese: 第2章「俺は銀河の渡り鳥」編)
Gai ventures across space to collect all four elements (fire, water, air and earth) for the Orbcalibur. It also features him meeting Murnau and Alien Gapiya Sadis (characters of Ultraman Orb the Movie) for the first time. The entire arc is separated into four stories:
- Eternal Jewel Planet (宝石惑星は永遠に, Hōseki Wakusei wa Eien ni)
- Those Who Come from the Abyss (深淵より出づる者たち, Shin'en yori Izuru Mono-tachi)
- Operation Fireball (ファイアーボール作戦, Faiābōru Sakusen)
- The Bodyguard from the Air Planet (風の星の用心棒, Kaze no Hoshi no Yōjinbō)
"Chapter 3 "The Man Who Stole the Black Hole" arc"
Transliteration: "Dai San-shō Burakku Hōru o Nusunda Otoko-hen" (Japanese: 第3章「ブラックホールを盗んだ男」編)
Juggler encounters the Space Girl Biranki (宇宙少女ビランキ, Uchū Shōjo Biranki) and eventually severs his connection with Gai as each grabs the Orb Ring and the Dark Ring respectively.
"Chapter 4 "Fight! Ishtal Civilization" arc"
Transliteration: "Dai Yon-shō Gekitō! Ishutāru Bunmei-hen" (Japanese: 第4章「激闘！イシュタール文明」編)
Gai and Juggler visited the television series' Earth for the first time. It features the appearance of Lord Monster of Darkness Maga-Tanothor (闇ノ魔王獣 マガタノゾーア, Yami no Maō-jū Maga Tanozōa).
"Chapter 5 "From Rusalka with Love" arc"
Transliteration: "Dai Go-shō Rusāruka yori Ai o Komete-hen" (Japanese: 第5章「ルサールカより愛をこめて」編)
Gai meets Natasha Romanová in Rusalka and receives his trademark leather jacket from Captain Scudder (スカダー大尉, Sukadā-taii). Lord Monster of Light Maga-Zetton (光ノ魔王獣 マガゼットン, Hikari no Maō-jū Maga Zetton) appears and the entire arc consisted of two stories:
- From Rusalka with Love
- Follow the Mystery of the Flying Saucers! (空飛ぶ円盤の謎を追え！, Sora Tobu Enban no Nazo o Oe!)
"Chapter 6 "The Wandering Sun" arc"
Transliteration: "Dai Roku-shō Sasurai no Taiyō-hen" (Japanese: 第6章「さすらいの太陽」編)
The current setting of the original television series. The magazine itself mentioned a segment called Overture (オーバチュア=序曲, Ōbachua).
"Chapter 7 "Space Witch Thief Murnau's Counterattack - Return of Sadis" arc"
Transliteration: "Dai Nana-shō Uchū Majo Zoku Murunau no Gyakushū Sadesu no Kikan-hen" (Japanese: 第7章「宇宙魔女賊ムルナウの逆襲・サデスの帰還」編)
Events of Ultraman Orb The Movie (劇場版 ウルトラマンオーブ 絆の力、おかりします！, Gekijōban Urutoraman Ōbu Kizuna no Chikara, Okarishimasu!; Also read as "Ultraman Orb the Movie: Let Me Borrow the Power of Bonds!") takes place. It was properly announced on November 23, 2016 in a special event in the Ario Hashimoto shopping mall in Sagamihara, Japan.
"Chapter 8 "Super Sky Great Evil Beast Desastro" arc"
Transliteration: "Dai Hasshō Chōkū Dai Kyōjū Dezasutoro-hen" (Japanese: 第8章「超空大凶獣デザストロ」編)
Follow-up of Ultraman Orb The Movie, meant as a crossover with Ultraman X. It features the appearance of Ultraman Zero and Ultraman X as they fight against Desastro.
"Chapter 9 "Messenger of the Netherworld Mage" arc"
Transliteration: "Dai Kyū-shō Meifu Madō no Shisha-hen" (Japanese: 第9章「冥府魔道の使者」編)
Features the eight-episode miniseries Ultra Fight Orb (ウルトラファイトオーブ 親子の力、おかりします！, Urutora Faito Ōbu Oyako no Chikara, Okarishimasu!; Also read as "Ultra Fight Orb: Let Me Borrow the Power of Father and Son!").
"Chapter 10 "Migration Birds, Go to the Sky" arc"
Transliteration: "Dai Jusshō Wataridori, Sora o Iku-hen" (Japanese: 第10章「渡り鳥、宇宙（そら）を行く」編)
The final chapter which focuses on Gai, Juggler and Biranki. The plan ended with the story "still continues".

== Other appearances ==
=== Films and team-ups ===
- Ultraman Geed The Movie (2018): See here
- Ultraman R/B (2018): In this show, a copy of Ultraman Orb's power was exploited by Makoto Aizen to transform into a black knockoff of the original hero, Ultraman Orb Dark.
- Ultra Galaxy Fight: New Generation Heroes/Ultraman Taiga (2019)/Ultraman Taiga The Movie (2020): See here.
- Ultraman Z (2020): In this show, Jugglus Juggler returns as a supporting character under his alias Shota Hebikura.

== Ultraman Fusion Fight! ==
In response to the series' premier, a Data Carddass arcade game had been launched, called Ultraman Fusion Fight! (ウルトラマン フュージョンファイト!, Urutoraman Fyūjon Faito!) on July 31, 2016. The game is based on Ultraman Orb's Fusion Up ability, which involves players inserting two Ultra Fusion Cards to create a combination form for Orb, either in-series or game-exclusives. Accordingly, there are 56 cards in existence.

== Ultraman Orb: The Chronicle ==
Ultraman Orb: The Chronicle (ウルトラマンオーブ THE CHRONICLE, Urutoraman Ōbu Za Kuronikuru) is a biography series of Ultraman Orb that had aired on January 6, 2018.

== Cast ==
- Gai Kurenai (クレナイ・ガイ, Kurenai Gai)/Ultraman Orb (Voice): Hideo Ishiguro (石黒 英雄, Ishiguro Hideo)
- Naomi Yumeno (夢野 ナオミ, Yumeno Naomi): Miyabi Matsuura (松浦 雅, Matsūra Miyabi)
- Jetta Hayami (早見 ジェッタ, Hayami Jetta): Naoto Takahashi (髙橋 直人, Takahashi Naoto)
- Shin Matsudo (松戸 シン, Matsudo Shin): Hiroaki Nerio (ねりお 弘晃, Nerio Hiroaki)
- Jugglus Juggler (ジャグラス・ジャグラー, Jagurasu Jagurā): Takaya Aoyagi (青柳 尊哉, Aoyagi Takaya)
- Ittetsu Shibukawa (渋川 一徹, Shibukawa Ittetsu): Shingo Yanagisawa (柳沢 慎吾, Yanagisawa Shingo)
- Natasha Romanova (ナターシャ・ロマノワ, Natāsha Romanowa): Vlada (ブラダ, Burada; of Hajirai Rescue JPN)

=== Voice cast ===
- Orb Ring (オーブリング, Ōbu Ringu): Takahiro Sakurai (櫻井 孝宏, Sakurai Takahiro)

=== Guest cast ===
- Public bath owner (3): Taro Suwa (諏訪 太朗, Suwa Tarō)
- Genzaburo Tomatsu (戸松 源三郎, Tomatsu Genzaburō; 8): Kenji Anan (阿南 健治, Anan Kenji)
- Ryuji Baba (馬場 竜次, Baba Ryūji; 9): Ryusuke Nakamura (中村 龍介, Nakamura Ryūsuke)
- Jetta's father (9): Katsuyuki Yamazaki (山﨑 勝之, Yamazaki Katsuyuki)
- Keiko Yumeno (夢野 圭子, Yumeno Keiko; 11–12, 16): Minako Tanaka (田中 美奈子, Tanaka Minako)
- Soichi Kofune (小舟 惣一, Kofune Sōichi; 14–15): Ryo Kinomoto (木之元 亮, Kinomoto Ryō)
- Tamaru (田丸; 14): Kazuyoshi Nakazawa (中澤 兼利, Nakazawa Kazuyoshi) (Note: Credited under Catcher Nakazawa (キャッチャー中澤, Kyatchā Nakazawa).)
- Manager Black (ブラック店長, Burakku-tenchō; 22): Shoichiro Akaboshi (赤星 昇一郎, Akaboshi Shōichirō)
- Ryutaro Suganuma (菅沼 龍太郎, Suganuma Ryutarō; 24): Shirō Sano (佐野 史郎, Sano Shirō).

== Songs ==
Opening theme

- "Orb no Inori" (オーブの祈り, Ōbu no Inori; lit. "Orb's Prayer")
  - Lyrics & Composition: Toshihiko Takamizawa (高見沢 俊彦, Takamizawa Toshihiko)
  - Arrangement: Toshihiko Takamizawa with Yuichiro Honda (本田 優一郎, Honda Yūichirō)
  - Artists: Ichiro Mizuki (水木 一郎, Mizuki Ichirō) with Voyager (ボイジャー, Boijā)
  - Episodes: 1–13 (Verse 1), 14–24 (Verse 2)
  During the Pre-Premiere Special and the final episode, this song is played as an ending theme.

Ending theme

- "Shine your ORB"
  - Lyrics: TAKERU and Chiaki Seshimo
  - Composition & Arrangement: Takao Konishi (小西 貴雄, Konishi Takao)
  - Artists: Voyager feat. Gai Kurenai (Hideo Ishiguro) & SSP (Miyabi Matsuura, Naoto Takahashi and Hiroaki Nerio)
  - Episodes: 1–13 (Verse 1), 14–24 (Verse 2)

== International broadcast ==
In Hong Kong, this series aired on ViuTV on June 6, 2017. In Malaysia, this series also aired on Astro Ceria on September 29, 2017. In Indonesia, this series also aired on Rajawali Televisi on August 25, 2018.

== See also ==
- Ultra Series - Complete list of official Ultraman-related shows
