= Hideo Ishiguro =

Japanese actor (born 1989)

- 石黒英雄
- Born: Hideo Ishiguro; January 10, 1989 (age 37); Tochigi Prefecture, Japan
- Occupation: Actor
- Years active: 2004–present
- Height: 1.80 m (5 ft 11 in)

Hideo Ishiguro (石黒 英雄, Ishiguro Hideo; born January 10, 1989 in Tochigi Prefecture, Japan) is a Japanese actor who is noted for his roles as Kai in the 2007 Kamen Rider Den-O and as Gai Kurenai in the 2016 Ultraman Orb.

== Filmography ==
=== Drama Series ===
- 2005: Brother Beat (TBS)
- 2005: Gokusen 2 (TV Asahi)
- 2006: Princess Princess D (TV Asahi)
- 2006: Kōmyō ga Tsuji (NHK), Toyotomi Hideyori
- 2007: Elite Yankee Saburo (TV Tokyo)
- 2007: Kamen Rider Den-O (TV Asahi)
- 2008: Gokusen 3 (NTV)
- 2008: The One Pound Gospel (NTV)
- 2008: Cat Street (NHK)
- 2009: RESCUE (TBS)
- 2009: Dandy Dandy (TV Asahi)
- 2010: Mattsugu (NHK)
- 2010: Chase (NHK)
- 2010: Hammer Session! (TBS)
- 2011: 99 Days With The Superstar (Fuji TV)
- 2011: The Tempest (NHK)
- 2012: Hungry! (Fuji TV)
- 2013: Saki (Fuji TV)
- 2014: Binta] (NTV-YTV)
- 2015: Daddy Detective (TBS)
- 2016: The Last Restaurant (NHK)
- 2016: Ultraman Orb (TV Tokyo)
- 2016-2017: Ultraman Orb: The Origin Saga (Amazon Video)
- 2017: Ultra Fight Orb (TV Tokyo)
- 2018: Ultraman Orb: The Chronicle (TV Tokyo)
- 2019: Ultra Galaxy Fight: New Generation Heroes (YouTube)
- 2022: Ultra Galaxy Fight: The Destined Crossroad (YouTube)

=== TV Movies ===
- 2006: Satomi Hakkenden (TBS)
- 2007: Byakkotai (TV Asahi)
- 2007: Himawari (TBS)
- 2009: Gokusen Graduation Special '09 (NTV)
- 2014: Ride Ride Ride (NHK)
- 2015: The Eternal Zero (TV Tokyo)

=== Movies ===
- 2008: Sing, Salmon, Sing!
- 2009: Elite Yankee Saburo
- 2009: Gokusen: The Movie
- 2009: Keitai Kareshi
- 2010: Higanjima
- 2010: Bushido Sixteen
- 2016: Tokyo City Girl
- 2017: Ultraman Orb The Movie
- 2018: Ultraman Geed The Movie
- 2019: BLACKFOX: Age of the Ninja
- 2020: Ultraman Taiga The Movie
