= Akane Sakanoue =

Japanese actress

- 坂ノ上 茜
- Born: December 5, 1995 (age 30); Kumamoto Prefecture, Japan
- Occupation: Actress
- Years active: 2009–present

Akane Sakanoue (坂ノ上 茜, Sakanoue Akane) is a Japanese actress from Kumamoto Prefecture and affiliated to the talent agency Amuse. She is also talented in gymnastics, a trait that was demonstrated in her role as Asuna Yamase in 2015 Ultra Series, Ultraman X.

== Filmography ==
=== Television drama ===
Year	Title	Role	Other notes	Ref.
2015	Ultraman X	Asuna Yamase	Lead role	
2018	We Are Rockets!	Eri Kashimura		

=== Other television ===
Year	Title	Other notes	Ref.
2019–24	Machi Chūka de Yarouze		

=== Films ===
Year	Title	Role	Other notes	Ref.
2015	Ultraman X The Movie	Asuna Yamase	Lead role	
2019	Back Street Girls: Gokudols	Kazuhiko/Chika Sugihara		
2020	Your Eyes Tell	Keiko Tsunomori		
2022	Lovely Little Ai	Ai	Lead role	
2023	Bad City	Nohara		
2023	Divine	Ena Katō		
2023	Go Away, Moebius!!	Yūko Sakuragawa	Lead role	
2024	Take Me to Another Planet			
2025	Traveling Alone			
2025	My Beloved Stranger			
2025	Nagasaki: In the Shadow of the Flash			
2025	Kumamoto no Kareshi	Misaki Saeki		
2027	Akiramemasen!			
