= The Supernatural Sweet Shop =

Japanese novel series

ふしぎ駄菓子屋 銭天堂 (Fushigi Dagashiya Zenitendō)
- Novel series
- Written by: Reiko Hiroshima
- Illustrated by: Jyajya
- Published by: Kaiseisha
- Original run: May 2013 – present
- Volumes: 21
- Anime film

Fushigi Dagashiya Zenitendō: Tsuritai Yaki
- Directed by: Satoshi Tomioka (Kanban Graphics)
- Written by: Yūji Kobayashi
- Music by: Michiru
- Studio: Toei Animation
- Released: August 14, 2020
- Runtime: 9 minutes
- Anime television series
- Directed by: Satoshi Tomioka (1–52); Katsumi Ono (53–148)
- Written by: Yūji Kobayashi
- Music by: Michiru
- Studio: Toei Animation; Kanban Graphics (1–52); Gallop (53–148)
- Original network: NHK Educational TV
- Original run: September 8, 2020 – March 14, 2025
- Episodes: 148
- Live-action film

The Supernatural Sweet Shop: The Movie
- Directed by: Hideo Nakata
- Written by: Reiko Yoshida
- Music by: Masaru Yokoyama
- Studio: Kadokawa
- Released: December 13, 2024
- Runtime: 103 minutes

The Supernatural Sweet Shop (Japanese: ふしぎ駄菓子屋 銭天堂, Hepburn: Fushigi Dagashiya Zenitendō) is a Japanese children's novel series written by Reiko Hiroshima, with illustrations by Jyajya. Kaiseisha has published the books since May 2013, with 21 volumes as of October 15, 2024. An anime television series adaptation by Toei Animation premiered on September 8, 2020. It was also adapted by Toei into a segment of the omnibus film Toei Manga Matsuri, titled Fushigi Dagashiya Zenitendō: Tsuritai Yaki, which was originally scheduled to premiere in Japanese theaters by Toei Company on April 24, 2020, but was postponed to August 14, 2020, as a result of the COVID-19 pandemic.

A live-action film was released by Toho on December 13, 2024.

== Characters ==
Beniko (紅子)
Voiced by: Nobue Iketani

A mysterious shopkeeper of Zenitendō. Beniko assists the buyer by offering a candy suited for their troubles. However, it depends on whether the candy will be used or eaten correctly that it can bring happiness or misfortune.

Sumimaru (墨丸)
Voiced by: Fukujurō Katayama

A black cat who assists Beniko at her shop.

== Media ==
=== Anime ===
The first series of episodes ran from September 2020 to April 2023. The second series started with episode 85 in April 2023 and ran to number 116 on March 1, 2024. A third series started with episode 117 on April 5, 2024, and ran to episode 139 on November 15, 2024.
