= Hibiku Yamamura =

Japanese voice actress

- 山村 響
- Born: February 10, 1988 (age 38); Fukuoka Prefecture, Japan
- Occupations: Voice actress; singer
- Years active: 2007–present
- Agent: Haikyō
- Notable work: Go! Princess PreCure as Kirara Amanogawa/Cure Twinkle; Kiratto Pri☆Chan as Luluna; Kiznaiver as Noriko Sonozaki; Warlords of Sigrdrifa as Claudia Bruford; Fate/Samurai Remnant as Saber/Yamato Takeru
- Height: 160 cm (5 ft 3 in)
- Spouse: Yuyoyuppe (m. 2023)
- Musical career
- Also known as: hibiku
- Genres: J-Pop; Anison
- Instrument: Vocals
- Years active: 2010–present
- Labels: FlyingDog (2010-2017); Tokyo Logic Music (2018-2019); echo Records (2020-)

Hibiku Yamamura (山村 響, Yamamura Hibiku; born February 10, 1988) is a Japanese voice actress and singer. As a solo singer, she used the name hibiku before 2019. She is affiliated with Haikyō.

On July 7, 2021, it was announced Yamamura had tested positive for COVID-19. She recovered on July 14, 2021. On November 3, 2023, she announced her marriage to musician Yuyoyuppe.

== Biography ==
Hibiku Yamamura developed an interest in voice acting from an early age, reportedly influenced by anime and voice performances she admired during childhood. She later pursued formal training in voice acting, attending a vocational school specializing in animation and voice performance.

In addition to her voice acting career, Yamamura has demonstrated a strong interest in music. She began her career as a singer in 2010 and has released multiple singles and albums, often performing under the name "hibiku."

Yamamura is also known for her creative abilities beyond voice acting, including illustration and manga drawing. Her vocal range is described as mezzo-soprano, allowing her to portray a wide variety of characters across different genres.

She has cited her early exposure to anime and entertainment as a major factor in shaping her career path, eventually leading her to join the voice acting industry professionally in the late 2000s.

== Filmography ==
=== Anime series ===
- Kotatsu Neko (2009), Zero, Kurara
- Mitsudomoe (2010), Tabuchi, Abukawa, Odeko
- Mitsudomoe Zōryōchū! (2011), Tabuchi
- Penguindrum (2011), Mari Fujishiro
- Arata: The Legend (2013), Kikuri (Hime-Ou), Kannagi (young)
- Arpeggio of Blue Steel: Ars Nova (2013), Haruna
- Haganai Next (2013), Yōko Fuyuki
- Atelier Escha & Logy: Alchemists of the Dusk Sky (2014), Chrone
- Chikasugi Idol Akae-chan (2014), Momo
- Robot Girls Z (2014), Belgas V5
- Tribe Cool Crew (2014), Manabi Sakurazaka
- Dance with Devils (2015), Maria Tachibana, Lindo Tachibana (child)
- Go! Princess PreCure (2015), Kirara Amanogawa/Cure Twinkle
- JoJo's Bizarre Adventure: Stardust Crusaders Egypt Arc (2015), Nukesaku (female face)
- Mobile Suit Gundam: Iron-Blooded Orphans (2015), Eva Turbine
- Noragami Aragoto (2015), Izanami
- Seraph of the End (2015), Asuramaru
- Seraph of the End: Battle in Nagoya (2015), Asuramaru
- The Testament of Sister New Devil Burst (2015), Lukia
- Tribe Cool Crew (2015), Mizuki's Mother
- Wooser's Hand-to-Mouth Life: Phantasmagoric Arc (2015), Haruna
- Anne Happy (2016), Hibiki Hagyū
- Assassination Classroom (2016), Sakura Kiyashiki
- Dimension W (2016), Twin Robots
- Gate 2nd Season (2016), Noriko Mochizuki
- Kiznaiver (2016), Noriko Sonozaki
- Re:Zero − Starting Life in Another World (2016), Raksha Risch
- Keijo (2016), Mio Kusakai
- Kenka Bancho Otome: Girl Beats Boys (2017), Hinako Nakayama
- Kamisama Minarai: Himitsu no Cocotama (2017), Hikari Chono, Cala
- Hina Logi ~from Luck & Logic~, Nina Alexandrovna
- Layton Mystery Tanteisha: Katori no Nazotoki File (2018–19), Geraldine Royer
- Doreiku (2018), Eia Arakawa
- Island (2018), Sara Garando
- GeGeGe no Kitarō 6th series (2018), Agnes
- The Magnificent Kotobuki (2019), Zara
- Ultramarine Magmell (2019), Emilia
- Cautious Hero: The Hero Is Overpowered but Overly Cautious (2019), Ariadoa
- Beastars (2019), Mizuchi
- Kiratto Pri☆Chan (2020), Luluna
- Interspecies Reviewers (2020), Demia Duodectet
- Peter Grill and the Philosopher's Time (2020), Lisa Alpacas
- Smile Down the Runway (2020), Aoi Tsumura
- Sakura Wars the Animation (2020), Azami Mochizuki
- The Case Files of Jeweler Richard (2020), Young Richard
- Warlords of Sigrdrifa (2020), Claudia Bruford
- Seven Knights Revolution: Hero Successor (2021), Faria
- Muv-Luv Alternative (2021), Mitsuki Hayase
- Shadowverse Flame (2022), Itsuki Mitsutagawa
- Ya Boy Kongming! (2022), Nanami Kuon
- Peter Grill and the Philosopher's Time: Super Extra (2022), Lisa Alpacas
- My Master Has No Tail (2022), Bunko
- Heavenly Delusion (2023), Tokio
- The Aristocrat's Otherworldly Adventure: Serving Gods Who Go Too Far (2023), Nina
- The Legendary Hero Is Dead! (2023), Yuna
- Liar, Liar (2023), Ami Kagaya
- Mr. Villain's Day Off (2024), Sora, Mugi
- Pon no Michi (2024), Haneru Emi
- Re:Monster (2024), Twins
- The Idolmaster Shiny Colors (2024), Hazuki Nanakusa
- Medalist 2nd Season (2026), Iruka Okazaki
- Witch Hat Atelier (2026), Agott
- I'm Looking for Zombies (2026), Yū
- Code Geass: Star Chaser Aspal (2027), Zoe

=== Anime films ===
- Arpeggio of Blue Steel: Ars Nova Cadenza (2015), Haruna
- Arpeggio of Blue Steel: Ars Nova DC (2015), Haruna
- Pretty Cure All Stars: Spring Carnival (2015), Kirara Amanogawa/Cure Twinkle
- Go! Princess Precure the Movie: Go! Go!! Splendid Triple Feature!!! (2015), Kirara Amanogawa/Cure Twinkle
- Pretty Cure All Stars: Singing with Everyone Miraculous Magic! (2016), Kirara Amanogawa/Cure Twinkle
- Pretty Cure Dream Stars! (2017), Kirara Amanogawa/Cure Twinkle
- Hug! Pretty Cure Futari wa Pretty Cure: All Stars Memories (2018), Kirara Amanogawa/Cure Twinkle

=== Tokusatsu ===
- Ultraman X (2015), X Devizer Voice/Navigation voice/Announcements
- Ultraman X The Movie (2016), X Devizer Voice/Navigation voice/Announcements
- New Ultraman Retsuden (2016), X Devizer Voice
- Ultraman Orb The Movie (2017), X Devizer Voice
- Ultraman Geed (2017), Public evacuation announcement

=== Video games ===
- Dream Club Gogo. (2014), Miyabi
- Sōshū Senshinkan Gakuen Hachimyōjin (2014), Mizuki Sera
- Asdivine Dios (2015), Minerva
- Go! Princess PreCure: Sugar Ōkoku to Rokunin no Princess (2015), Kirara Amanogawa/Cure Twinkle
- Utawarerumono: Futari no Hakuoro (2016), Shisu
- Granblue Fantasy (2017), Leona
- Sword Art Online: Fatal Bullet (2018), Musketeer X
- Azur Lane (2017), USS Alabama (BB-60), KMS Ulrich von Hutten
- Girls' Frontline (2019), Px4 Storm, 62 Shiki
- Fire Emblem Heroes (2019), Rinea
- Sakura Wars (2019), Azami Mochizuki
- Arknights (2020), Flint
- Last Cloudia (2020), Maddine
- Guardian Tales (2020), Exorcist Swordswoman Saya
- Touhou Spell Bubble (2020), Youmu Konpaku
- Blue Archive (2021), Chihiro Kagami
- Star Ocean: The Divine Force (2022), Lola Jornaus
- World Dai Star: Yume no Stellarium (2023), Iruru Yorozu
- Fate/Samurai Remnant (2023), Saber
- Fate/Grand Order (2024), Yamato Takeru

=== Dubbing ===
- Ambulance, Cam Thompson (Eiza González)
- Antiviral, Hannah Geist (Sarah Gadon)
- Before Midnight, Hank (Seamus Davey-Fitzpatrick), Nina (Charlotte Prior)
- Crimson Peak, Edith Cushing (Mia Wasikowska)
- Flight 7500, Suzy Lee (Jamie Chung)
- From Dusk till Dawn: The Series, Santanico Pandemonium / Kisa (Eiza González)
- The Frozen Ground, Debbie Peters (Gia Mantegna)
- The Lazarus Project, Archie (Anjli Mohindra)
- Run Boy Run, Srulik Frydman / Jurek Staniak (Andrzej Tkacz)
- Trap, Lady Raven (Saleka Night)
- White House Farm, Julie Mugford (Alexa Davies)

== Discography ==
=== Singles ===
Release date	Title	Catalog No.
January 27, 2010	Tsumeato	VTCL-35082
July 19, 2014	Kaze o Kanjite	HBK-0002
October 26, 2014	Plastic Shoes	HBK-0003
April 26, 2015	Mirai wa Bokura no Kono Te no Naka ni	HBK-0004
April 5, 2020	Suki	
April 24, 2022	Cycle☆Cycle	

=== Mini-albums ===
Release date	Title	Catalog No.
February 10, 2017	Jewels Garden	HBK-0005
June 6, 2018	Love Magic	TLMC-0004
March 6, 2019	Take Over You	TLMC-0005
September 11, 2021	Town	

=== Albums ===
Release date	Title	Catalog No.
May 5, 2013	hibiku the Universe	HBK-0001
