= Ultraman Orb The Movie =

- Blu-Ray DVD cover, featuring Ultraman Orb in Orb Trinity

Japanese name
- Kanji: 劇場版 ウルトラマンオーブ 絆の力、おかりします！
Transcriptions
- Revised Hepburn: Gekijōban Urutoraman Ōbu Kizuna no Chikara, Okarishimasu!
- Directed by: Kiyotaka Taguchi
- Written by: Takao Nakano
- Based on: Ultraman Orb by Kiyotaka Taguchi
- Starring: Hideo Ishiguro; Miyabi Matsuura; Naoto Takahashi; Hiroaki Nerio; Takaya Aoyagi; Shingo Yanagisawa; Kensuke Takahashi; Oniyakko Tsubaki; Kohji Moritsugu
- Music by: Takao Konishi
- Production company: Tsuburaya Productions
- Distributed by: Shochiku
- Release date: March 11, 2017
- Running time: 72 mins
- Country: Japan
- Language: Japanese

Ultraman Orb The Movie (劇場版 ウルトラマンオーブ 絆の力、おかりします！, Gekijōban Urutoraman Ōbu Kizuna no Chikara, Okarishimasu!; also called "Ultraman Orb The Movie: Let Me Borrow the Power of Bonds!") is a 2017 Japanese superhero and Kaiju film, serving as the film adaptation of the 2016 Ultra Series television series Ultraman Orb. It was released on 11 March 2017, in celebration to the 50th anniversary of Ultra Seven where the titular character himself and his son Ultraman Zero is set to appear. Both Blu-Ray and the DVD were released on 28 July 2017.

The catchphrase for the movie is "Great Gathering! New Generation Heroes" (大集結！新世代(ニュージェネレーション)ヒーローズ！, Dai shūketsu! Nyū Jenerēshon Hīrōzu!).

== Story ==
One day, a strange object appeared at the SSP's office, which was revealed to be the X Devizer, a transformation device which inhabited by Ultraman X. Having separated from his host, the Xio personnel Daichi Ozora due to an enemy attack, X sought the help of SSP and Gai (who returned from his wandering activities) in search for his human host but this however brings the threat of a new enemy.

The main villain approached herself as the space witch Murnau with the possession of a Dark Ring that empowers her own strength. With a desire to transform whatever pretty thing she fancies into her personal jewelry collection, she had already captured the Ultra Warriors Ginga and Victory and set her sight on Earth as the main target. Worse enough is the return of Jugglus Juggler who continued his scheming ways from behind the scenes again. With the help of Murnau's alien army, X had finally been captured and added to her jewellery collection.

Now Orb must rescue the new generation Ultra Warriors and master the power of bonds as the battle for Earth has begun.

== Production ==
This movie was previously glimpsed following the conclusion of 2016 Ultraman Festival. It was properly announced on November 23, 2016, in a special event in Ario Hashimoto shopping mall in Sagamihara, Japan. Hideo Ishiguro, the actor of Gai Kurenai highlighted that the movie will introduce Daichi, Ultraman X and Murnau as strong involvements to the plot while having a comedic scene on Shibukawa's part.

On December 9, Tsuburaya further revealed that voice actor Kōichi Yamadera and members of Jungle Pocket, a Japanese comedian trio will participate in the movie as voice casts. They as well revealed that Ultraman Zero, Ginga, Victory and X will be reprised by their original voice actors respectively while the movie's ending theme, TWO AS ONE will be performed by Da-ice and sold as part of their album, NEXT PHASE. Kudo and Hanamura of Da-ice became the guest voice actors of the movie as well, becoming their major debut in voice acting. The director also encouraged the voice actors to perform more ad-libs to their respective roles. Also in commemoration to the movie, preorder for Gai's leather jacket in Bandai Fashion was released and the product is set to shipment in March 2017. Early pre-order of said jacket comes with a pair of free movie tickets for parent-child pair. During the day of the film premiere, viewers will be given the chance to shake hands with Ultraman Orb in all of his forms. During the premier of Ultraman Orb the Movie, director Kiyotaka Taguchi reveals that he summed up the entire Ultraman Orb series and spin offs into 10 chapters:

- The Origin Saga is envisioned to be chapter 1.
- The original series is chapter 6.
- Ultraman Orb The Movie is chapter 7.

Due to this, he also mentioned that there will be another future project for the series, with chapters 2-5 taking place in-between The Origin Saga and the original series, while chapters 8-10 will be after the premiere movie.

=== Reception ===
According to the Japanese theatre website Eiga.com, Ultraman Orb The Movie ranks seventh in the box office during its premier date.

== Cast ==
- Gai Kurenai (クレナイ・ガイ, Kurenai Gai)/Ultraman Orb (ウルトラマンオーブ, Urutoraman Ōbu; Voice): Hideo Ishiguro (石黒 英雄, Ishiguro Hideo)
- Naomi Yumeno (夢野 ナオミ, Yumeno Naomi): Miyabi Matsuura (松浦 雅, Matsūra Miyabi)
- Jetta Hayami (早見 ジェッタ, Hayami Jetta): Naoto Takahashi (髙橋 直人, Takahashi Naoto)
- Shin Matsudo (松戸 シン, Matsudo Shin): Hiroaki Nerio (ねりお 弘晃, Nerio Hiroaki)
- Jugglus Juggler (ジャグラス ジャグラー, Jagurasu Jagurā)/Zeppandon (ゼッパンドン; Voice): Takaya Aoyagi (青柳 尊哉, Aoyagi Takaya)
- Ittetsu Shibukawa (渋川 一徹, Shibukawa Ittetsu): Shingo Yanagisawa (柳沢 慎吾, Yanagisawa Shingo)
- Murnau (ムルナウ, Murunau): Oniyakko Tsubaki (椿 鬼奴, Tsubaki Oniyakko)
- Daichi Ozora (大空 大地, Ōzora Daichi): Kensuke Takahashi (高橋 健介, Takahashi Kensuke)
- Dan Moroboshi (モロボシ・ダン, Moroboshi Dan)/Ultraseven]] (ウルトラセブン, Urutorasebun; Voice): Kohji Moritsugu (森次 晃嗣, Moritsugu Kōji)
- Tsurunoyu (鶴の湯) shopkeeper: Taro Suwa (諏訪 太朗, Suwa Tarō)
- Yūka (ユウカ): Kokoro Hirasawa (平澤 宏々路, Hirasawa Kokoro)
- Alien Ckalutch (クカラッチ星人, Kukaratchi Seijin): Masayuki Nunome (布米 正幸, Nunome Masayuki)
- Galmess (ガルメス人, Garumesu-jin): Emi Katayama (片山 絵美, Katayama Emi)
- Cicada Woman (セミ女, Semi Onna): Hitomi Adachi (安達 仁美, Adachi Hitomi)
- Hypnas (ヒュプナス, Hyupunasu): Katsuyuki Okamura (岡村 勝之, Okamura Katsuyuki)
- Darebolic's victims: Kiyotaka Taguchi (田口 清隆, Taguchi Kiyotaka), Yuchi Abe (アベユーイチ, Abe Yūichi), Ryuichi Ichino (市野 龍一, Ichino Ryūichi), Suguru Tomita (冨田 卓, Tomita Suguru), Masayoshi Takesue (武居 正能, Takesue Masayoshi)

=== Voice actors ===
- Ultraman Zero (ウルトラマンゼロ, Urutoraman Zero): Mamoru Miyano (宮野 真守, Miyano Mamoru)
- Ultraman X (ウルトラマンエックス, Urutoraman Ekkusu): Yuichi Nakamura (中村 悠一, Nakamura Yūichi)
- Ultraman Ginga (ウルトラマンギンガ, Urutoraman Ginga): Takuya Negishi (根岸 拓哉, Negishi Takuya)
- Ultraman Victory (ウルトラマンビクトリー, Urutoraman Bikutorī): Kiyotaka Uji (宇治 清高, Uji Kiyotaka)
- X Devizer Voice: Hibiku Yamamura (山村 響, Yamamura Hibiku)
- Orb Ring Voice: Takahiro Sakurai (櫻井 孝宏, Sakurai Takahiro)
- Alien Gapiya "Sadis" (ガピヤ星人サデス, Gapiya Seijin Sadesu): Kōichi Yamadera (山寺 宏一, Yamadera Kōichi)
- Alien Guts "Doppel" (ガッツ星人ドッペル, Gattsu Seijin Dopperu): Shinji Saitō (斉藤 慎二, Saitō Shinji; of Jungle Pocket)
- Alien Hipporito "Callisto" (ヒッポリト星人カリスト, Hipporito Seijin Karisuto): Hirohisa Ōta (太田 博久, Ōta Hirohisa; of Jungle Pocket)
- Alien Temperor "Batista" (テンペラー星人バチスタ, Tenperā Seijin Bachisuta): Otake (おたけ; of Jungle Pocket)
- Cicada Woman, Alien Serpent (サーペント星人, Sāpento Seijin): Taiki Kudō (工藤 大輝, Kudō Taiki; of Da-ice)
- Alien Ckalutch, Lecuum (レキューム人, Rekyūmu Jin): Sōta Hanamura (花村 想太, Hanamura Sōta; of Da-ice)

== Theme song ==
Insert theme

- "Orb no Inori" (オーブの祈り, Ōbu no Inori; lit. "Orb's Prayer")
  - Lyrics & Composition: Toshihiko Takamizawa (高見沢 俊彦, Takamizawa Toshihiko)
  - Arrangement: Toshihiko Takamizawa with Yuichiro Honda (本田 優一郎, Honda Yūichirō)
  - Artists: Ichiro Mizuki (水木 一郎, Mizuki Ichirō) with Voyager (ボイジャー, Boijā)

Ending theme

- "TWO AS ONE"
  - Lyrics: MOMO"mocha"N.
  - Composition: KID STORM, MUSOH, BASIM
  - Arrangement: KID STORM
  - Artist: Da-ice
