= Ultra Fight Orb =

Japanese television miniseries

- The online poster release, featuring the characters involved. (Clockwise: Ultraman Orb Lightning Attacker, Ultraman Orb Emerium Slugger, Ultraman Zero and Reibatos)
- Also known as: Ultra Fight Orb: Let Me Borrow the Power of Father and Son!
- Genre: Tokusatsu; Sci-Fi; Action/Adventure; Superhero; Kaiju
- Created by: Tsuburaya Productions
- Written by: Junichiro Ashiki
- Directed by: Koichi Sakamoto
- Starring: Hideo Ishiguro; Mamoru Miyano; Kohji Moritsugu
- Composer: Takao Konishi
- Country of origin: Japan
- No. of episodes: 8

Production
- Running time: 3–4 minutes (mini episode cut); 30 minutes (full episode)

Original release
- Network: TV Tokyo
- Release: April 15 – June 3, 2017

Related
- Ultra Fight Victory; Ultra Galaxy Fight

Ultra Fight Orb: Let Me Borrow the Power of Father and Son! (ウルトラファイトオーブ 親子の力、おかりします！, Urutora Faito Ōbu Oyako no Chikara, Okarishimasu!) is a Japanese television miniseries produced by Tsuburaya Productions as a spin-off of Ultraman Orb. This miniseries is released on April 15, 2017, aired during the ending segment of Ultraman Zero: The Chronicle programming block on TV Tokyo. This film as well features the live appearance of Ultraman Orb's two game-exclusive forms, Lightning Attacker (ライトニングアタッカー, Raitoningu Atakkā) and Emerium Slugger (エメリウムスラッガー, Emeriumu Suraggā) from Ultraman Fusion Fight!. At the end of the series, it features the debut of the titular character of Ultraman Geed.

Ultra Fight Orb was Jiro Dan's final role as Ultraman Jack before his death from lung cancer.

== Synopsis ==
As a successor to the Reionics, Reibatos tries to fulfill both Alien Rayblood and Ultraman Belial's failed legacy by reviving an army of monsters and conquer the universe. Meanwhile, Orb deals with a Demaaga on Earth and used the power of Ultraman Ginga and Ultraman X as Lightning Attacker to destroy it. Seeing its energy mass flew to space, Orb chased it to Planet Yomi (惑星ヨミ, Wakusei Yomi), where he helped Zero in fighting against Juda Spectre and Mecha Gomora. After eliminating both of them, Orb decided to assist Zero in his investigation before Reibatos greeted them. He revives six monsters, Vict Lugiel, Hyper Zetton, King Joe, Gudon, Twin Tail and Birdon as distractions for the two before leaving. After dealing with two of them, Zero sent Orb to chase Reibatos before his father Seven, Zoffy and Ultraman Jack arrive to his aid. Orb stopped Reibatos in the midway and managed to deal fatal blow but the villain simply shrugs it off due to his regenerative ability. Through his words, Zoffy deduced that he is trying to pursue the Giga Battle Nizer in the Monster Graveyard and leaves with Jack while Orb received a special training in Zero's subspace dimension, Shining Field (シャイニングフィールド, Shainingu Fīrudo).

After regaining the Giga Battle Nizer, Reibatos revived Tyrant for Jack and Zoffy to fight as he try to revive an army of 100 monsters. After training for 10 years, Orb was acknowledged by Seven and being granted his Ultra Fusion Card. Guided by the visions he received before, Orb used it in conjunction with Zero and transform into Emerium Slugger. The three raced towards the Monster Graveyard and quickly defeated Tyrant with their combined attacks. Zero transported Orb to Reibatos' realm and the Ultra quickly unleashed an all-out attack to prevent his regeneration before he finally delivers the finishing blow. In the Land of Light, Orb received congratulation for his assistance in the mission and was offered the Star Marks and a place in the Space Garrison for his bravery but politely refused due to his nature as a wanderer. As he left, Zero still wonders of the Giga Battle Nizer's disappearance and keeps this as a secret from anyone.

Meanwhile, Reibatos survived his apparent destruction and try to revive Ultraman Belial in hopes of fulfilling his revenge but fails and discovered that his predecessor is still alive. Rebatos then finds himself killed off by a mysterious figure whose appearance astonished him. (Note: In episode 25 of Ultraman Geed, Reibatos' murderer was retconned into Belial himself. Koichi Sakamoto (who directed both series) stated that both versions are different in each other.)

== Production ==
Ultra Fight Orb was teased during the initial announcement of Ultraman Zero: The Chronicle, appearing at the very corner of the biography series' advertising poster. The full news of the miniseries was announced on February 20, 2017 by Tsuburaya themselves.

Although original DVD is slated to be released on December 22, 2017, Bandai Visual collaborates with Premium Bandai for the pre-order exclusive Blu-Ray release of Ultra Fight Orb. Said package is sold at 5,378 yen and bundled with a transparent figure of Reibatos while pre-orders can be made from May 12, 2017 before delivery in September.

== Cast ==
- Gai Kurenai (クレナイ・ガイ, Kurenai Gai)/Ultraman Orb (ウルトラマンオーブ, Urutoraman Ōbu, Voice): Hideo Ishiguro (石黒 英雄, Ishiguro Hideo)
- Ultraman Zero (ウルトラマンゼロ, Urutoraman Zero, Voice): Mamoru Miyano (宮野 真守, Miyano Mamoru)
- Ultraseven (ウルトラセブン, Urutorasebun, Voice): Kohji Moritsugu (森次 晃嗣, Moritsugu Kōji)
- Ultraman Jack (ウルトラマンジャック, Urutoraman Jakku, Voice): Jiro Dan (団 時郎, Dan Jirō)
- Zoffy (ゾフィー, Zofī, Voice): Hideyuki Tanaka (田中 秀幸, Tanaka Hideyuki)
- Reibatos (レイバトス, Reibatosu, Voice): Hidenari Ugaki (宇垣 秀成, Ugaki Hidenari)

== Songs ==
Insert theme

- "Ultra Roku Kyodai" (ウルトラ六兄弟, Urutora Roku Kyōdai, lit. "Ultra 6 Brothers")
  - Lyrics: Yū Aku (阿久 悠, Aku Yū)
  - Composition & Arrangement: Makoto Kawaguchi (川口 真, Kawaguchi Makoto)
  - Artist: Ryōichi Fukuzawa (武村 太郎, Fukuzawa Ryōichi), Mizuumi Boys and Girls Choir (少年少女合唱団みずうみ, Shōnen Shōjo Gasshōdan Mizuumi)
- "Orb no Inori" (オーブの祈り, Ōbu no Inori, lit. "Orb's Prayer")
  - Lyrics & Composition: Toshihiko Takamizawa (高見沢 俊彦, Takamizawa Toshihiko)
  - Arrangement: Toshihiko Takamizawa with Yuichiro Honda (本田 優一郎, Honda Yūichirō)
  - Artists: Ichiro Mizuki (水木 一郎, Mizuki Ichirō) with Voyager (ボイジャー, Boijā)

Ending theme

- "Shine your ORB"
  - Lyrics: TAKERU and Chiaki Seshimo
  - Composition & Arrangement: Takao Konishi (小西 貴雄, Konishi Takao)
  - Artists: Voyager feat. Gai Kurenai (Hideo Ishiguro) & SSP (Miyabi Matsuura, Naoto Takahashi and Hiroaki Nerio)
  - The ending song is only available on Blu-Ray purchase of Ultra Fight Orb.

== See also ==
- Ultraman Orb
- Ultraman Geed
