= Ultraman X The Movie =

- Blu-Ray DVD cover, featuring Ultraman Exceed X in Beta Spark Armor

Japanese name
- Kanji: 劇場版 ウルトラマンX きたぞ! われらのウルトラマン
Transcriptions
- Revised Hepburn: Gekijōban Urutoraman Ekkusu Kita zo! Warera no Urutoraman
- Directed by: Kiyotaka Taguchi
- Written by: Takao Nakano; Yuji Kobayashi; Hirotoshi Kobayashi
- Based on: Ultraman X by Koichi Sakamoto
- Starring: Kensuke Takahashi; Akane Sakanoue; Yoshihiko Hosoda; Ukyo Matsumoto; Hayato Harada; Haruka Momokawa; TAKERU; Chiaki Seshimo; Sarara Tsukifume; Yuu Kamio; Takami Yoshimoto; Serai Takagi; Yuka Nakayama; Michael Tomioka
- Narrated by: Yasunori Matsumoto
- Music by: Takao Konishi
- Production company: Tsuburaya Productions
- Distributed by: Shochiku
- Release dates: 12 March 2016 (Japan); 8 January 2017 (United States)
- Running time: 73 mins
- Country: Japan
- Language: Japanese

Ultraman X The Movie (劇場版 ウルトラマンX きたぞ! われらのウルトラマン, Gekijōban Urutoraman Ekkusu Kita zo! Warera no Urutoraman; also called "Ultraman X The Movie: Here He Comes! Our Ultraman") is a Japanese superhero and kaiju film, serving as the film adaptation of the 2015 Ultra Series television series Ultraman X. It was released on March 12, 2016, in celebration to the 50th anniversary of the Ultra Series, as well as 50th anniversary of Ultraman and 20th anniversary of Ultraman Tiga, both appearing in this movie as supporting characters. The film was scheduled for release on January 8, 2017, in the United States along with Ultraman Ginga S The Movie as a double feature. Actors of the English dub were announced on December 10, 2016, by SciFi Japan. The American release also coincided with the Canadian release from William Winckler Productions.

The main catchphrase in this movie is "Zaigorg Strikes! Unleash the Beta Spark Armor!" (地獄(ザイゴーグ)襲来! 解き放て究極の力(ベータスパークアーマー)!!, Zaigōgu shūrai! Tokihanate Bēta Supāku Āmā!!).

== Synopsis ==
After a series of past clips of the TV series and Gourman's failed attempt at summoning the original Ultraman, Xio members pick up a strange signal while celebrating Daichi's return from Australia. They trace it towards the Baraji Ruins (芭羅慈(バラジ)遺跡, Baraji Iseki) (Note: "Baraji" is a homage to the city of Baradhi (バラージ, Barāji) from the seventh episode of Ultraman.) located in Baraji Village, Akita Prefecture and cross path with the Tamaki mother-son pair. As a result of the greedy treasure hunter Carlos Kurosaki, the ancient kaiju Zaigorg is lifted from his ancient seal and manages to defeat Ultraman X. X is restored by Daichi, but his Devizer is damaged from the fight while Gourman the Tiga statue and the Sparklence brought by Yuto. In order to reseal Zaigorg, Tsukasa and Asuna attempt to coerce Carlos into returning the blue stone he stole earlier while Xio members initiate "Hell No. 3" (黄泉三号, Yomi San-gō) to slow down Zaigorg from advancing, but their use of Cyber Cards are countered by his Inferno Demon Clones, Antlar and Fire Golza.

With the three Kaijus approaching Carlos Communication, an evacuation is finally held. At Gourman's behest, Rui brings Yuto to his mother before joining the other Xio members. As Zaigorg attacks the tower, Tsukasa is trapped under a steel beam and orders the others to evacuate but Yuto's strong will for his mother activates the Sparklence to save her and finally becomes Ultraman Tiga, simultaneously restoring the X Devizer for Daichi to Unite with X. The blue stone in Carlos' possession summons the original Ultraman and all three of them participate in a coordinated attack with Xio members. With Antlar and Fire Golza destroyed, X seemingly defeats their leader, but Zaigorg emerges unharmed and drains Tiga and Ultraman of their energies to summon five different Tsurugi Demaagas in various countres across the globe. Gourman finishes creating the Cyber Cards of Ultraman and Tiga and has Rui and Mamoru send them to Daichi, who uses it and equips Ultraman Exceed X with the Beta Spark Armor. Using the Beta Spark Sword, he frees Tiga and Ultraman and fights against Zaigorg. The Cyber Cards of past Ultra Warriors resonates and summons all of them to fight the Tsurugi Demaagas in the countries where Zaigorg sent them . Exceed X merges with Tiga and Ultraman, creating a huge cyber wing that charges the worldwide Ultra Warriors with the energy needed to finish off Tsurugi Demaaga. Returning to Earth, he quickly defeats Zaigorg and ends his reign of terror.

The others celebrate the X's victory and the Ultra Warriors regroup for a moment before leaving. Tiga reverts to Yuto and X separates with Daichi. Because of humanity's bonds, he finally regains the true body that was lost 15 years ago and Ultraman leaves the Earth. X thanks Xio for their cooperation since the first time they met and reassures to Daichi that they will always stay united and will return should the Earth is in danger once more before leaving. Yuto awakens, nearly having no recollection of his time as Tiga but is praised by his mother, something that he had yearned for. At the headquarters, Xio members celebrate their victory but X returns to them and he explains that the Earth will be under attack by Desastro, a Kaiju from the Centaurus Constellation. Xio's satellite picks up the Kaiju's sighting and the team rolls out once more.

== Production ==
The project was first announced by Tsuburaya Productions on July 23, 2015, and in Ultraman Festival 2015. On November 28, 2015, the title and the movie poster was released in Tsuburaya Productions' blog.

Among of its supporting casts were Takami Yoshimoto, previously known for Rena Yanase in Ultraman Tiga. Takami herself is the daughter of Susumu Kurobe (the actor of the original Ultraman's protagonist, Shin Hayata), who also the guest attendant of the movie's press conference as he latter expresses his congratulations. Michael Tomioka, Carlos Kurosaki's actor was a guest actor in episode 44 of Ultraman Dyna and stated that he felt honored for being a part of the movie, having watched the Ultra Series since his childhood.

Ever since the movie's screening, several stage greetings were held. The final stage greeting was on May 11, 2016, which was held as a sign of departure for the casts of Ultraman X to the spectators, as Daichi Ozora (Kensuke) passes the baton to Ultraman Orb, the Ultra Warrior of his upcoming titular series.

== English dub production ==
In December 2016, Japanese studio Tsuburaya Productions Company Ltd., and their U.S. distributor William Winckler Productions, Inc. announced that select U.S. theaters across all major U.S. cities will debut the English dubbed 50th Anniversary feature film of Ultraman titled Ultraman X The Movie. This was the first North American theatrical release of an Ultraman feature film in its entire 50-year history. It premiered in a double feature along with their new English dubbed film Ultraman Ginga S The Movie on January 8, 2017.

== Cast ==
=== Japanese casts ===
Actors

- Daichi Ozora (大空 大地, Ōzora Daichi): Kensuke Takahashi (高橋 健介, Takahashi Kensuke)
- Asuna Yamase (山瀬 アスナ, Yamase Asuna): Akane Sakanoue (坂ノ上 茜, Sakanoue Akane)
- Wataru Kazama (風間 ワタル, Kazama Wataru): Yoshihiko Hosoda (細田 よしひこ, Hosoda Yoshihiko)
- Hayato Kishima (貴島 ハヤト, Kishima Hayato): Ukyo Matsumoto (松本 享恭, Matsumoto Ukyō)
- Mamoru Mikazuki (三日月 マモル, Mikazuki Mamoru): Hayato Harada (原田 隼人, Harada Hayato)
- Rui Takada (高田 ルイ, Takada Rui): Haruka Momokawa (百川 晴香, Momokawa Haruka)
- Takeru Yamagishi (山岸 タケル, Yamagishi Takeru): TAKERU
- Chiaki Matsudo (松戸 チアキ, Matsudo Chiaki): Chiaki Seshimo (瀬下 千晶, Seshimo Chiaki)
- Sayuri Tachibana (橘 さゆり, Tachibana Sayuri): Sarara Tsukifune (月船 さらら, Tsukifune Sarara)
- Shotaro Kamiki (神木 正太郎, Kamiki Shōtarō): Yuu Kamio (神尾 佑, Kamio Yū)
- Tsukasa Tamaki (玉城 ツカサ, Tamaki Tsukasa): Takami Yoshimoto (吉本 多香美, Yoshimoto Takami)
- Yuto Tamaki (玉城 ユウト, Tamaki Yūto): Serai Takagi (高木 星来, Takagi Serai)
- Saeko Kirihara (桐原 冴子, Kirihara Saeko): Yuka Nakayama (中山 由香, Nakayama Yuka)
- Carlos Kurosaki (カルロス黒崎, Karurosu Kurosaki): Michael Tomioka (マイケル富岡, Maikeru Tomioka)
- Host of "Carlos Kurosaki's World Mystery Q" (カルロス黒崎のワールド・ミステリーQ, Karurosu Kurosaki no Wārudo Misuterī Kyū): Madoka Nishijima (西島 まどか, Nishijima Madoka)
- Assistant of the show: Hiroko Terada (寺田 浩子, Terada Hiroko)
- Kurosaki's patrons: Akane Koga (古賀 あかね, Koga Akane), Reimi Kobayashi (小林 レイミ, Kobayashi Reimi), Akiko Shiba (芝 彰子, Shib Akiko), Nao Koide (小出 奈央, Koide Nao)
- Director: Satoshi Tochihara (栃原 智, Tochihara Satoshi)
- Videographer: Kenta Akayama (赤山 健太, Akayama Kenta)
- Lighting technician: Taro Fujisawa (藤澤 太郎, Fujisawa Tarō)
- Sound recordist: Koji Kunishige (國重 光司, Kunishige Kōji)

Voice actors

- Ultraman X (ウルトラマンエックス, Urutoraman Ekkusu): Yuichi Nakamura (中村 悠一, Nakamura Yuichi)
- Alien Fanton "Gourman" (ファントン星人 グルマン, Fanton Seijin Guruman): Yasunori Matsumoto (松本 保典, Matsumoto Yasunori)
- X Devizer Voice, Navigation Voice, Announcement: Hibiku Yamamura (山村 響, Yamamura Hibiku)
- Ultraman Ginga (ウルトラマンギンガ, Urutoraman Ginga): Takuya Negishi (根岸 拓哉, Negishi Takuya)
- Ultraman Zero (ウルトラマンゼロ, Urutoraman Zero): Mamoru Miyano (宮野 真守, Miyano Mamoru)

=== English dub actors ===
- Daichi Ozora: Britain Simons
- Asuna Yamase: Elise Napier
- Wataru Kazama: John Katona
- Hayato Kishima: Bradford Hill
- Mamoru Mikazuki: Josh Madson
- Rui Takada: Valerie Rose Lohman
- Takeru Yamagishi: R.J. Word
- Chiaki Matsudo: Beth Ann Sweezer
- Sayuri Tachibana: Alison Lees-Taylor
- Shotaro Kamiki: Roy Abramsohn
- Tsukasa Tamaki: Pamela Hill
- Yuto Tamaki: Anisa Vong
- Saeko Kirihara: Lisle Wilkerson
- Carlos Kurosaki: Justin Andrews
- Assistant of Show: Parissa Koo
- Director: Jay Dee Witney
- Ultraman X: William Winckler
- Alien Fanton "Gourman": G. Larry Butler
- Ultraman Ginga: Nicholas Adam Clark
- Ultraman Victory: Bryan Forrest
- Ultraman Zero: Daniel Van Thomas
- Ultraman Max: Frank Gerrish
- Narrator: David Ruprecht

== Theme song ==
- "Unite ~Kimi to Tsunagaru Tame ni~" (Unite ～君とつながるために～; "Unite ~To Unite With You~")
  - Lyrics: TAKERU, Chiaki Seshimo
  - Composition & Arrangement: Takao Konishi
  - Artist: Voyager feat. Project DMM
