= Shingo Yanagisawa =

Japanese actor, tarento and comedian (born 1962)

- 柳沢 慎吾
- Born: 6 March 1962 (age 64); Odawara, Kanagawa Prefecture, Japan
- Occupations: Actor; comedian
- Years active: 1979–present
- Agent: Heart Ray
- Website: Official profile

Shingo Yanagisawa (柳沢 慎吾, Yanagisawa Shingo; born March 6, 1962 in Odawara, Kanagawa Prefecture) is a Japanese actor and comedian.

== Filmography ==
=== Variety ===
Year	Title	Notes	Ref.
2015	Shingo Yanagisawa ni Bazooka!!! Jack		

=== TV dramas ===
Year	Title	Role	Notes	Ref.
1979	Kinpachi-sensei	Kaede Middle School student	Episode 7	
1980	Tonda Couple	Shingo Narimoto		
1983–1997	Apples and Oranges	Nomi Sakai	4 seasons	
1986	Hanekonma	Yoshihiro Tachibana	Asadora	
1999	Genroku Ryōran	Saruhashi Musashinosuke	Taiga drama	
2010	Teppan	Hideo Shinoyama	Asadora	
2013	Yae's Sakura	Kayano Gonbei	Taiga drama	

=== Films ===
Year	Title	Role	Notes	Ref.
1981	Sailor Suit and Machine Gun	Tomoo		
2015	Kamen Rider Drive: Surprise Future	Susumuji Koyo		
2016	Pin-chū!	Yoichi Uton	Lead role	
2027	The High School Family	The principal		

=== Japanese dub ===
==== Live-action ====
Year	Title	Role	Dub for	Notes	Ref.
2015	Pixels	Sam Brenner	Adam Sandler		
2017	War for the Planet of the Apes	Bad Ape	Steve Zahn		

==== Animation ====
Year	Title	Role	Notes	Ref.
2005	Madagascar	Marty		
2008	Madagascar: Escape 2 Africa	Marty		
2010	Madagascar 3: Europe's Most Wanted	Marty		

=== Advertisements ===
Year	Title	Ref.
2015	Mitsubishi UFJ Trust and Banking Corporation	
2016	Acecook Wakame Ramen	
