= Takao Nakano =

Japanese film director, screenwriter and actor

- Born: May 15, 1962 (age 64); Osaka, Japan
- Occupations: Film director Screenwriter; Actor
- Years active: 1991–

Takao Nakano (中野貴雄, Nakano Takao; born May 15, 1962) is a Japanese film director, screenwriter and actor who has worked in pink film, adult videos (AV), and in mainstream comedy, horror and fantasy films. Film critic Jasper Sharp describes him as one of the few figures in the Japanese erotic film scene who have made a name for themselves overseas.

== Life and career ==
Nakano was born in Osaka, Japan in 1962. He began working in pink film with the Shintōhō Eiga company and in 1991, together with Toshiki Satō and Toshiya Ueno, Nakano assembled a conpendium of the best scenes from pink films which was released by Shintōhō Eiga as That's Hentai-tainment.

Nakano made his debut as a director with the pink film Super Extreme Real Performance: Stupefaction (超過激本番・失神, Chō kageki honban" shassin), also known as Spiral Zone, for Shintōhō Eiga in 1992. Nakano won the Best New Director award at the 1992 Pink Grand Prix ceremony.

Nakano moved into the adult video (AV) scene in 1993 directing two videos for V&R Planning, The Playgirls (ザ・プレイガールズ) and The Playgirls 2 (ザ・プレイガールズ2 裸の夜の悩殺拳). The next year, Nakano produced the tentacle rape genre video, ExorSister, the first of a series of four hardcore erotic horror releases. The videos all featured manga artist Bang Ippongi as Maria Cruel the ExorSister. The Allmovie site commented on the "cheesy" quality of the shot on video productions. One of the sequels Uratsukidōji: Daiinshin Fukkatsu-hen starred AV Idol Yumika Hayashi. Nakano followed this series with the 1996 softcore comedy video Sumo Vixens (花のおんな相撲, Hana no onna sumō) featuring topless sumo wrestling girls including actress Kei Mizutani. It was later (2001) released with English subtitles. As an actor, Nakano performed in the gay-themed 1997 pink film The Gays in Wonderland (不思議の国のゲイたち, Fushigi no kuni no gei-tachi).

In 1998 Nakano wrote and directed the V-Cinema release Shogun's Secret Harem aka Edo Castle Shogun's Harem Romantic Story: Big Debauchery Melting Picture Scroll (江戸城大奥綺譚 大淫乱蕩絵巻, Edo-jō Ō-oku Kitan: Dai-Inran Tō Emaki) set in the Edo period and starring actresses Yumi Yoshiyuki, Yumika Hayashi and Hotaru Hazuki. He was also the screenwriter for the 2000 pink film fantasy Whore Angels which won the Silver Prize for Best Film of the year at the 2000 Pink Grand Prix ceremony. Nakano's second venture into directing pink film was again for Shintōhō Eiga, the May 2002 production Playgirl 7: Most Extreme Bawdy Games (プレイガール７ 最も淫らな遊戯, Pureigāru 7:motto mo midara na yūgi). But Nakano's most important contribution to pink film was probably his screenplay for the internationally known The Glamorous Life of Sachiko Hanai which had a significant effect on the making of pink film.

Nakano also continued his career as a pink film actor, appearing in several works directed by Yumi Yoshiyuki, including the February 2004 Aspiring Home Tutor: Soiled Pure Whiteness which took the award for Seventh Best Film at the Pink Grand Prix ceremony and the Pearl Prize at the Pinky Ribbon Awards and the 2005 Miss Peach: Peachy Sweetness Huge Breasts which won the fifth Best Film of the year at the Pink Grand Prix ceremony and the Pinky Ribbon Award as the Best Film of 2005.

In August 2004, he returned to the horror genre, writing and directing the low-budget V-Cinema Sexual Parasite: Killer Pussy (奇性蟲 キラープッシー, Kiseichū: Kiraa Pusshii), a revision of David Cronenberg's Shivers starring Yumi Yoshiyuki and Sakurako Kaoru. One review describes it as a "comical, over-the-top" film "that delivers a bizarre storyline that is largely entertaining." The film was a subject of one of the segments of the BBC documentary Japanorama.

Nakano has been active in promoting live girl-on-girl wrestling bouts in Tokyo and several of his works have featured wrestling or cat fighting including the previously mentioned Sumo Vixens and the 2002 video Metomic: Hand-to-Hand Battle Royale (女闘美ック・ファイト 肉弾バトル・ロワイアル, Metomikku faito:ikudan batoru rowaiyaru) which also starred Kei Mizutani. He also wrote the screenplay for the wrestling comedy Kabuto-O Beetle from 2005.

More recently, he wrote and directed the 2009 erotic comedy Hop Step Jump! (ほっぷ すてっぷ じゃんぷッ！), a fantasy comedy based on a manga by Okada Kazuto about a bullied school custodian who becomes a human frog with superhuman powers when he is bitten by a poisonous frog. He also wrote and directed the May 2010 release Big Tits Zombie featuring AV Idol Sora Aoi as a zombie killing stripper.

Nakano was one of several former colleagues who participated in the 2009 documentary by Japanese-Korean director Tetsuaki Matsue on Yumika Hayashi titled Annyong Yumika (あんにょん由美香, Annyon Yumika).

Starting in 2014, he made involvements in Tsuburaya Productions-related media, becoming the writer of the Ultra Series. Among of his notable works are: Ultraman Ginga S, Ultraman X and Ultraman Orb.

== Filmography ==
- series head writer denoted in bold

=== Writer/Director ===
- Super Extreme Real Performance: Stupefaction (1992)
- The Playgirls (1993)
- The Playgirls 2 (1993)
- Shogun's Secret Harem (1998)
- Playgirl 7: Most Extreme Bawdy Games (2002)
- Sexual Parasite: Killer Pussy (2004)
- Hop Step Jump! (2009)
- Big Tits Zombie (2010)

=== Writer (Television) ===
- Element Hunters (2009)
- **Ultraman Ginga S** (2014)
- **Ultraman X** (2015)
- **Ultraman Orb** (2016)
- **Ultraman R/B** (2018)
- **Ultraman Taiga** (2019)
- Ultraman Z (2020)
- Ultraman Decker (2022)
- Ultraman Blazar (2023)
- Ultraman Arc (2024)
- Ultraman Omega (2025)

=== Writer (Film) ===
- Ultraman Ginga S The Movie (2015)
- Ultraman X The Movie (2016)
- Ultraman Orb The Movie (2017)
- Ultraman R/B The Movie (2019)
- Ultraman Taiga The Movie (2020)
