= The Alfee =

Japanese rock band

- Also known as: Alfie, The KanLeKeeZ
- Origin: Tokyo, Japan
- Genres: Progressive rock; hard rock; folk music
- Years active: 1973–present
- Labels: Victor, Pony Canyon, EMI, Universal/Virgin
- Members: Masaru Sakurai; Kohnosuke Sakazaki; Toshihiko Takamizawa
- Past members: Yasuo Miyake
- Website: www.alfee.com

The Alfee (formerly spelled Alfie) is a Japanese rock band formed in Tokyo in 1973. Originally a folk quartet, they became a trio of bassist Masaru Sakurai, acoustic guitarist Kohnosuke Sakazaki and electric guitarist Toshihiko Takamizawa in 1975. With all three performing vocal duties, they adopted a harder rock sound in the early 1980s. Beginning with their 16th single "Marie-Anne" in 1983, they have released 59 consecutive top 10 singles. The Alfee hold the record for most concerts performed by a Japanese band, with 3,000 as of April 2026. HMV Japan ranked them number 92 on their list of the top 100 Japanese pop acts.

== History ==
After moving to Tokyo in 1970, Masaru Sakurai formed a three-piece band at Meiji Gakuin Senior High School called Confidence (コンフィデンス), which covered Western music acts such as Simon & Garfunkel. In 1972, they entered a folk music contest sponsored by Victor and won. There, Sakurai met Kohnosuke Sakazaki, who joined the group later that year. Sakurai and Sakazaki both enrolled in Meiji Gakuin University. There, they recruited Toshihiko Takamizawa, who was also a classmate of Sakurai's in high school. Confidence changed their name to Alfie in 1973, and released their first single "Natsu Shigure" on August 25, 1974. Their first album, Seishun no Kioku (re-titled Greenhorn on most re-issues), was released on July 25, 1975. Yasuo Miyake then left the group, leaving the lineup of Sakurai, Sakazaki and Takamizawa, which continues to this day. The song "Fuchutorimono Hikae" was set to be released as their third single on December 10, 1975, the day the statute of limitations expired for the 300 million yen robbery, which is parodied in the lyrics. However, Victor cancelled its release due to the connection, causing a rift between the band and their label. (The song would finally be released in 2014 as part of a re-release of Seishun no Kioku that coincided with the band's 40th anniversary.) Alfie produced no further music for Victor. Instead, they acted as the backing band for artists such as Hiroshi Kamayatsu. In 1979, they signed with Pony Canyon (then known as Canyon Records), changed the spelling of their name to Alfee, and released "Love Letter" as their third single on January 21.

In 1983, their song "Marie-Anne" became a massive hit. It earned them an appearance at the prestigious Kōhaku Uta Gassen event, where they performed the song. That year, Alfee performed at the Nippon Budokan for the first time. This began a 35-year tradition of them performing at the venue every year, until 2019, when renovations for the 2020 Summer Olympics ended the streak. They hold the record for most concerts at the Nippon Budokan by a band, with 105 as of December 2025.

The band added "The" in front of their name in 1986. That year, their August 3 concert Sweat & Tears Tokyo-Bay Area, which was held at Tokyo Bay Reclaimed Land No. 13 (now Odaiba), set a Japanese attendance record for the largest-ticketed concert ever held by a single act when it attracted 100,000 people. Additionally, the name "Tokyo Bay Area" coined by Takamizawa, became a common name by which the area is known.

With their 50th single, "Taiyō ha Shizumanai", released in August 2002, The Alfee set a Japanese record for 35 consecutive top 10 singles on the Oricon Singles Chart.

In March 2014, Sakurai, Sakazaki and Takamizawa were presented with honorary degrees from Meiji Gakuin University, their alma mater where they had formed The Alfee. In the 1970s, Takamizawa had dropped out of the school, while Sakurai and Sakazaki were expelled. At a December 2015 concert at the Nippon Budokan, The Alfee performed as an alterego band named The KanLeKeeZ. The idea was, with all three members having reached their 60s, they decided to pay tribute to group sounds bands of the 1960s. The KanLeKeeZ released the album G.S. meets The KanLeKeeZ on December 21, 2016. It won a Planning Award at the 59th Japan Record Awards in 2017.

Due to providing the theme song to Kansai TV's broadcast of the Osaka International Women's Marathon for 31 consecutive years from 1987 until 2018, when the broadcaster announced they would no longer use themes, The Alfee were certified with the Guinness World Record for "Most theme songs sung by the same artist for the same international sports event broadcast on TV" in December 2018.

With the release of "The 2nd Life -Daini no Sentaku-" in July 2021, The Alfee achieved 55 consecutive top 10 singles on the Oricon Singles Chart. This tied them with SMAP and AKB48 for second place, behind Arashi with 58. Celebrating their 50th anniversary, they performed at the Nippon Budokan on December 23 and 24, 2023. The former marked their 100th concert at the venue. The July 2024 double A-side "Ko.Da.Ma." / "Romance ga Maiorite Kita Yoru" was their 58 consecutive top 10 single, returning them to second place alongside Arashi, and behind AKB48 with 62. At the end of the year, The Alfee performed at the 75th NHK Kōhaku Uta Gassen. Taking place 41 years after their first Kōhaku Uta Gassen appearance, it marks the longest gap between appearances in the event's history. "Heart of Rainbow", released in July 2025, made them the male act with the most consecutive top 10 singles.

== Members ==
Principal members

- Masaru Sakurai (桜井 賢, Sakurai Masaru): Born January 20, 1955 (age 71) in Chichibu, Saitama. Vocals, bass guitar
- Kohnosuke Sakazaki (坂崎 幸之助, Sakazaki Kōnosuke): Born April 15, 1954 (age 72) in Sumida, Tokyo. Vocals, acoustic guitar, percussion, former bandleader
- Toshihiko Takamizawa (高見沢 俊彦, Takamizawa Toshihiko): Born April 17, 1954 (age 72) in Warabi, Saitama. Vocals, electric guitar, main songwriter, bandleader since 1983. Also has a solo career as "Takamiy".

Early member

- Yasuo Miyake (三宅康夫, Miyake Yasuo): Born January 8, 1955 (age 71). Vocals, guitar (1973–1975)

== Discography ==
=== Studio albums ===
- Seishun no Kioku (青春の記憶; July 25, 1975, re-titled Greenhorn on most reissues)
- Time and Tide (August 21, 1979)
- Sanjūshi (讃集詩; May 21, 1980)
- Almighty (October 21, 1981)
- Doubt, (April 21, 1982)
- Alfee (January 5, 1983)
- Alfee's Law (September 5, 1983)
- The Renaissance (July 5, 1984)
- For Your Love (June 19, 1985)
- Ages (November 25, 1986)
- UK Breakfast (December 9, 1987)
- DNA Communication (March 21, 1989)
- Arcadia (October 17, 1990)
- Journey (April 29, 1992)
- Mugen no Hate ni (夢幻の果てに; January 20, 1995)
- Love (March 21, 1996)
- Nouvelle Vague (March 25, 1998)
- Ōrb (September 29, 1999)
- Glint Beat (September 12, 2001)
- Going My Way (October 1, 2003)
- One -Venus of Rock- (November 22, 2006)
- Shin Sekai -Neo Universe- (新世界 -Neo Universe-; March 10, 2010)
- Sanmi Ittai (三位一体; December 23, 2015)
- Battle Starship Alfee (June 26, 2019)
- Tenchi Sōzō (天地創造; February 23, 2022)
- Kimi ga Ikiru Imi (君が生きる意味; December 24, 2025)

=== Compilation albums ===
- Alfee A-Side Collection (ALFEE A面 コレクション; July 21, 1983)
- Alfee B-Side Collection (ALFEE B面 コレクション; October 5, 1983)
- Page One: 13 Pieces of Alfee (December 5, 1983)
- Alfee Gold (September 5, 1984)
- Alfee Silver (September 5, 1984)
- Best Selection (December 5, 1984, re-titled Best Selection I on re-issues)
- Alfee 4-Way Story (August 21, 1985, released on two separately-sold cassettes)
- The Best Song (December 5, 1985)
- Alfee A-Side Collection Special (アルフィーA面コレクション スペシャル; April 21, 1986)
- Alfee B-Side Collection Special (アルフィーB面コレクション スペシャル; April 21, 1986)
- Non-Stop (December 21, 1986)
- Best Selection II (May 21, 1988)
- The Alfee: The Best (December 4, 1991)
- Promised Love -The Alfee Ballad Selection- (December 16, 1992)
- Single History I: 1979–1982 (September 20, 1994)
- Single History II: 1983–1986 (November 20, 1994)
- Single History III: 1987–1990 (December 20, 1994)
- Single History IV: 1991–1994 (February 20, 1995)
- Emotional Love Songs (November 19, 1997)
- Emotional Message Songs (November 19, 1997)
- Pride (August 7, 1998)
- The Best 1997–2002 ~Apres Nouvelle Vague~ (March 5, 2003)
- Yume yo Isoge -Osaka International Ladies Marathon Image Song Album- (夢よ急げ-大阪国際女子マラソンイメージソング・アルバム-; March 10, 2004)
- The Alfee 30th Anniversary Hit Single Collection 37 (August 25, 2004)
- Starting Over ~Best Hit of The Alfee~ (March 29, 2006)
- Single History V: 1996–2001 (March 4, 2009)
- Single History VI: 2002–2008 (March 4, 2009)
- Alfee Gets Requests (July 25, 2012)
- Alfee Gets Requests! 2 (June 18, 2014)
- Single History VII: 2009–2012 (March 30, 2016)
- Last Run! (December 19, 2018)
- Single Connection & AGR -Metal & Acoustic- (December 20, 2023)
- The Alfee 50 Songs 1974–1996 (August 16, 2024)

=== Other albums ===
- One Night Dreams 1983–1987: Special Live Edition (September 17, 1987, live album)
- The Alfee Classics with London Symphony Orchestra (March 21, 1990, remix album)
- Confidence -The Alfee Acoustic Special Live- (July 21, 1993, live album)
- Live in Progress (July 21, 1995, live album)
- The Alfee Classics II: The Alfee with Royal Philharmonic Orchestra (December 16, 1996, remix album)
- The Alfee Classics III: The Alfee with Royal Philharmonic Orchestra (November 16, 2001, remix album)
- 40th Anniversary Special Concert at Nippon Budokan (デビュー40周年 スペシャルコンサート at 日本武道館; March 18, 2015, live album)

=== Singles ===
==== 1970s ====
- "Natsu Shigure (夏しぐれ; August 25, 1974)
- "Seishun no Kioku" (青春の記憶; May 25, 1975)
- "Love Letter" (ラブレター; January 21, 1979)
- "Odoriko no Yō ni" (踊り子のように; April 21, 1979)
- "Hoshi Furu Yoru ni... " (星降る夜に...; July 21, 1979)
- "Fuyu Shōgun" (冬将軍; October 21, 1979)

==== 1980s ====
- "Mugongeki" (無言劇; March 21, 1980)
  - Theme song of the 1980 TV Tokyo drama Aitsu to Ore
- "Utsukushī Season" (美しいシーズン; June 21, 1980)
  - Theme song of the 1980 Toei film Furyou Shounen
- "Koibito ni Naritai" (恋人になりたい; November 5, 1980)
- "Atesaki no Nai Tegami" (宛先のない手紙; May 21, 1981)
- "Tōri Ame" (通り雨; October 21, 1979)
- "Nakanai de My Love" (泣かないでMY LOVE; March 21, 1982)
- "Sunset Summer" (June 21, 1982)
- "Wakare no Rhythm" (別れの律動; November 21, 1982)
- "Akatsuki no Paradise Road" (暁のパラダイス・ロード; March 21, 1983)
- "Marie-Anne" (メリーアン; June 21, 1983)
- "Hoshizora no Distance" (星空のディスタンス; January 21, 1984)
  - Theme song of the 1984 TBS TV drama Mujaki na Kankei
- "Starship -Hikari wo Motomete" (STARSHIP－光を求めて－; May 21, 1984)
  - Theme song of the 1984 film SF Shinseki Lensman
- "Koibito-tachi no Pavement" (恋人達のペイヴメント; October 17, 1984)
- "Cinderella ha Nemurenai" (シンデレラは眠れない; February 21, 1985)
- "Kiri no Sofia" (霧のソフィア; October 16, 1985)
- "Fūyōbi, Kimi wo Tsurete" (風曜日、君をつれて; March 5, 1986)
- "Sweat & Tears" (July 5, 1986)
- "Rockdom: Kaze ni Fukarete" (ROCKDOM －風に吹かれて－; September 5, 1986)
- "Sapphire no Hitomi" (サファイアの瞳; March 11, 1987)
- "Don't Pass Me By" (君が通り過ぎたあとに, Kimi ga Tōrisugita Ato ni) March 11, 1987
  - Theme song of the 1987 Toho film Touch 3
- "Byakuya (白夜 -byaku-ya-; July 1, 1987)
- "My Truth" (October 28, 1987)
- "1-gatsu no Ame wo Wasurenai" (1月の雨を忘れない; January 21, 1988)
- "Weekend Shuffle -Hanayaka na Shūmatsu-" (WEEKEND SHUFFLE－華やかな週末－; March 16, 1988)
  - Theme song of the 1988 TBS drama Papa ha Nenjū Kurō-suru
- "19 (Nineteen)" (July 27, 1988)
- "Faith of Love" (December 21, 1988)
  - "Faith of Love" was the theme song of the 1989 Toei film Shogun's Shadow
- "Koibito no Uta ga Kikoeru" (恋人の歌がきこえる; October 25, 1989)
  - Theme song of the 1989 NTV drama of the same name

==== 1990s ====
- "Flower Revolution" (January 31, 1990)
- "Promised Love" (February 5, 1992)
  - Theme song of the 1992 NTV drama Pole Position! Aishiki Hito he...
- "Believe" (February 3, 1993)
  - Theme song of the 1992 TBS show Move
- "Victory" (April 28, 1993)
- "Mō Ichido Kimi ni Aitai" (もう一度君に逢いたい; December 1, 1993)
  - Ending theme of the 1992 NTV drama Super TV: Jōhō Saizensen
- "Mada Minu Kimi e no Ai no Uta" (まだ見ぬ君への愛の詩; May 14, 1994)
- "Complex Blue -Ai dake Kanashi Sugite-" (COMPLEX BLUE -愛だけ哀しすぎて-; September 20, 1994)
  - Theme song of the 1994 Fuji TV video series Complex Blue
- "Bōkensha-tachi" (冒険者たち; October 20, 1994)
  - Theme song of the 1994 NHK anime series Montana Jones
- "El Dorado" (エルドラド; October 20, 1994)
  - Ending theme of the 1994 NHK anime series Montana Jones
- "Love Never Dies" (January 29, 1996)
  - Theme song of the 1996 NTV drama Kiseki no Romance
- "Shiawase no Katachi ~Send My Heart~" (倖せのかたち ～Send My Heart～; October 16, 1996)
- "Brave Love: Galaxy Express 999" (February 25, 1998)
  - Theme song of the 1998 Toei anime film Galaxy Express 999: Eternal Fantasy
- "Kibō no Kane ga Naru Asa ni" (希望の鐘が鳴る朝に; February 3, 1999)
  - Theme song of the 1999 TBS film Salary Man Kintaro
- "Wings of Freedom" (May 23, 1999)
  - Sold only at Yokohama Flügels matches
- "Justice for True Love" (August 18, 1999)
  - Theme song of the 1999 anime film Kindaichi Shōnen no Jikenbo 2: Satsuriku no Deep Blue

==== 2000s ====
- "Never Fade" (December 6, 2000)
  - Ending theme of the TV Asahi program Tx2 Show
- "Juliet" (August 22, 2001)
  - Theme song of the TV Asahi program Sushi Azarashi and the ending theme of the TV Asahi program Tx2 Show
- "Taiyō ha Shizumanai" (太陽は沈まない; August 14, 2002)
  - Ending theme of the Fuji TV drama Shomuni Final
- "Tanpopo no Uta " (タンポポの詩; August 13, 2003)
  - Ending theme of the TV Asahi anime Doraemon
- "Kibō no Hashi" (希望の橋; February 18, 2004)
  - Theme song of the TBS drama Salary Man Kintaro 4
- "100 Oku no Love Story" (100億のLove Story; August 17, 2005)
  - Theme song of the TBS film Kochira Hon'ike Gamisho 5
- "Innocent Love" (October 24, 2006)
  - Theme song of the drama Mikon Roku Shimai
- "Dear My Life" (April 4, 2007)
- "Lifetime Love" (March 19, 2008)
- "Sakura Nomi no Jukusuru Toki" / "Kaze no Uta" (桜の実の熟する時 / 風の詩; May 13, 2009)
- "Looking for Daybreak" (夜明けを求めて, Yoake o Motomete; October 7, 2009)
- "Dedicate My Love" (この愛を捧げて, Kono Ai o Sasagete; December 16, 2009)
  - Theme song of the film Uchuu Senkan Yamato Fukkatsu-hen

==== 2010s ====
- "Let It Go" (May 3, 2011)
- "Ikiyou" (生きよう; March 14, 2012)
- "Final Wars!" / "Mōichido Koko Kara Hajimeyou" (もう一度ここから始めよう) (February 20, 2013)
- "Glorious" (November 13, 2013)
- "Eiyū no Uta (英雄の詩; August 26, 2014)
- "Kyō no Tsudzuki ga Mirai ni Naru" (今日のつづきが未来になる; May 25, 2016)
- "Anata ni Okuru Ai no Uta" (あなたに贈る愛の歌; May 24, 2017)
- "Ningen Dakara Kanashī nda" (人間だから悲しいんだ; December 20, 2017)

==== 2020s ====
- "Tomoyo Jinsei o Kataru Mae ni" (友よ人生を語る前に; September 2, 2020)
- "Joker -Nemuranai Machi- (Joker -眠らない街-; December 9, 2020)
- "The 2nd Life -Daini no Sentaku-" (The 2nd Life -第二の選択-; July 28, 2021)
- "Hoshizora no Ceremony" (星空のCeremony) / "Circle of Seasons" (October 5, 2022)
- "Hagane no Kishi Q" (鋼の騎士Q) / "Never Say Die" (May 17, 2023)
- "Ko.Da.Ma." / "Romance ga Maiorite Kita Yoru" (ロマンスが舞い降りて来た夜; July 24, 2024)
- "Heart of Rainbow" (July 30, 2025)

== Videography ==
- Over Drive 1983 Alfee 8.24 Budokan (October 21, 1983)
- Flying Away Alfee in Yokohama Stadium 1984.8.3 Fri (September 21, 1984)
- Alfee 3 Days 1985.8/27/28/29 Yokohama Stadium (October 15, 1985)
- The Alfee History I 1982–1985 (December 15, 1985)
- The Alfee 1986 8.3 Sweat & Tears Tokyo Bay-Area (October 5, 1986)
- 1986 12.24 Christmas Special All Night The Alfee (May 21, 1987)
- Sunset – Sunrise 1987 Aug. 8–9 (September 30, 1987)
- Meigaku Live 3 November 1987 (June 21, 1988)
- All Over Japan 4 Access Area 1988 (October 5, 1988)
- The Alfee in Gekitotsu (THE ALFEE in 激突; December 21, 1988)
- The Alfee with Jean Paul Gaultier (June 14, 1989)
- U.S. Camp Drake ASC The Alfee 1989.8.13 Sun (October 4, 1989)
- Bridge Across the Future Reel I: Yokohama MM21 Reel I (October 3, 1990)
- Bridge Across the Future Reel II: Yokohama MM21 Reel II (October 3, 1990)
- Arcadia Included by Count Down 1999 (November 21, 1990)
- Long Way to Freedom Revolution II & Smile Photo Collection (March 27, 1991)
- 10kaime no Natsu -Since 1991- (10回目の夏 -SINCE 1991-; October 2, 1991)
- The Alfee History II 1986–1991 (March 25, 1992)
- Just Live! Promised Night August 9, 1992 (October 7, 1992)
- Video Clips Victory (July 21, 1993)
- Victory Stadium Silver Night Special (October 21, 1993)
- Victory Stadium Gold Night Special (October 21, 1993)
- King's Night Dream Western Conference Final (October 5, 1994)
- King's Night Dream Eastern Conference Final (October 5, 1994)
- Gen'yosai Red Phantom Eve (幻夜祭 Red Phantom Eve; October 4, 1995)
- Gen'yosai Blue Phantom Eve (幻夜祭 Blue Phantom Eve; October 4, 1995)
- 1982-1994 Osaka Kokusai Joshi Marason Song by The Alfee (1982-1994 大阪国際女子マラソン Song by THE ALFEE; January 19, 1996)
- Yokohama Red Bricks I (October 2, 1996)
- Yokohama Red Bricks II (October 2, 1996)
- The Alfee Classics ~Yūgō~ (THE ALFEE CLASSICS 〜融合〜; March 19, 1997)
- Emotional Field Heat & Beat Emotion I (October 16, 1997)
- Emotional Field Heat & Beat Emotion II (October 16, 1997)
- The Alfee History III 1992–1997 (October 17, 1997)
- Tokyo One Night Dream (October 16, 1998)
- The Alfee in NY at Forest Hills Stadium 1st. July. 1998 (December 16, 1998)
- Millennium Carnival I (October 14, 1999)
- Millennium Carnival II (November 17, 1999)
- The Alfee in Berlin at Brandenburg Tour 26th, September 1999 (December 22, 1999)
- Millennium Final in Osaka － Live at Osakajyo-Hall "A.D. 1999" (March 16, 2000)
- Tokyo Aube Stadium Alfee Classics Night (October 16, 2000)
- Tokyo Aube Stadium Alfee Rockdom Night (October 16, 2000)
- The Best Ten & "Aru Hii Totsuzen!" Complete Edition 2000 (ザ・ベストテン&「ある日ィ突然!」 Complete edition 2000; December 22, 2000)
- Emotion Live at Budokan Dec. 24 (December 22, 2000)
- Nouvelle Vague Live at Budokan Dec. 24 (December 22, 2000)
- Final Count Down A.D. 1999 Live at Budokan Dec. 24 (December 22, 2000)
- Count Down 2001 Hello Good-bye (March 28, 2001)
- Kingdom Chapter I: Grateful Birth (November 16, 2001)
- Kingdom Chapter II: Never Ending Dream (November 16, 2001)
- The Alfee History IV 1997–2001 (March 27, 2002)
- Legend of The Stadium V Silver Legend (November 20, 2002)
- Legend of The Stadium V Gold Legend (November 20, 2002)
- Yokohama Swinging Generation: Generation Dynamite Day Aug. 16 (November 19, 2003)
- Yokohama Swinging Generation: Swinging Generation Day Aug. 17 (November 19, 2003)
- Aube 2000 Live at Budokan Dec. 24 (December 17, 2003)
- Aube 2001 Glint Beat Live at Budokan Dec. 24 (January 21, 2004)
- Aube 2002 Transformation Live at Budokan Dec. 24 (April 14, 2004)
- 30th Anniversary Video Clips II (September 15, 2004)
- The Alfee History I–III DVD Box Special Edition (September 15, 2004)
- 30th Anniversary 2004 Travelin' Band Live at NHK Hall May 30 (October 14, 2004)
- Love & Peace: A Day of Love Aug. 14 (November 7, 2004)
- Love & Peace: A Day of Peace Aug. 15 (November 7, 2004)
- 30th Anniversary Count Down 2005: Time and Tide (March 30, 2005)
- Tokyo Bay-Station Terminal 1 (November 23, 2005)
- Tokyo Bay-Station Terminal 2 (November 23, 2005)
- 2000th Live Concert Starting Over (March 29, 2006)
- 25th Summer 2006 Yokohama Star-ship Only One Night Aug. 12 (December 13, 2006)
- 25th Summer 2006 Yokohama Star-ship Next One Night Aug. 13 (December 13, 2006)
- Aube 2003 Going My Way Live at Budokan Dec. 24 (April 30, 2008)
- 30th Anniversary 2004 Travelin' Band Live at Budokan Dec. 24 (April 30, 2008)
- Aube 2005 Starting Over Live at Budokan Dec. 24 (April 30, 2008)
- Aube 2006 One Live at Budokan Dec. 24 (April 30, 2008)
- Aube 2008 Renaissance Live at NHK Hall (August 18, 2008)
- Aube 2007 Tenga no Fune Live at Budokan Dec. 24 (AUBE 2007 天河の舟 Live at BUDOKAN Dec.24; December 23, 2008)
- Aube 2008 Renaissance Live at Budokan Dec. 24 (December 23, 2009)
- Yokohama Perfect Burn 8.8 Burn Into Memory Night (February 14, 2010)
- Yokohama Perfect Burn 8.9 Burn Into Perfect Night (February 14, 2010)
- 35th anniversary 2009 My Truth Live at Budokan Dec. 24 (December 23, 2010)
- Aube 2010 Neo Universe II Live at Budokan Dec. 24 (April 20, 2011)
- The Alfee 2011 Special DVD "I Love You" (August 25, 2011)
- Neo Universe 2011 Final Series I Love You, Always... Live at Budokan Dec. 24 (April 25, 2012)
- One Night Dream 2012 We Get Requests! 2012.7.28 at Saitama Super Arena (December 23, 2012)
- The Alfee 2013 Special DVD "Grateful Birth" (August 24, 2013)
- Neo Universe 2012 Final Series Catch Your Earth Live at Budokan Dec. 24 (December 23, 2013)
- 40th Anniversary 2014 Video Clips II+ (August 6, 2014)
- Neo Universe 2013 Final Series Grateful Birth Final Live at Budokan Dec. 24 (October 25, 2014)
- 40th Anniversary 2014 40-nen-me no Natsu Saitama Super Arena 26.July.2014 (40th Anniversary 2014 40年目の夏 SAITAMA SUPER ARENA 26.July.2014; December 23, 2014)
- 40th Anniversary 2014 40-nen-me no Natsu Saitama Super Arena 27 July.2014 (40th Anniversary 2014 40年目の夏 SAITAMA SUPER ARENA 27.July.2014; December 23, 2014)
- The Last Genesis ~Toshi no Kiseki to Kiseki~ (THE LAST GENESIS ～40年の軌跡と奇跡～; June 17, 2015)
- 2,500 Kai Kinen Kaminari-mai Iwai! Sakuraimasaru Kanreki Konsāto (2500回記念雷舞 祝！桜井賢還暦コンサート; October 25, 2015)
- 40th Anniversary 2014 Genesis Final Live at Budokan Dec. 24 (November 25, 2015)
- Best Hit Alfee 2015 One Night Circle (December 23, 2015)
- Best Hit Alfee Final 2015 Live at Budokan Dec. 24 (November 30, 2016)
- Best Hit Alfee 2016 30th Summer! Natsu Fest Yokohama Arena 30.July.2016 (Best Hit Alfee 2016 30th Summer！ 夏フェス YOKOHAMA ARENA 30.July.2016; December 29, 2016)
- Best Hit Alfee 2016 30th Summer! Natsu Fest Yokohama Arena 31.July.2016 (Best Hit Alfee 2016 30th Summer！ 夏フェス YOKOHAMA ARENA 31.July.2016; December 29, 2016)
- Best Hit Alfee Final 2016 Fuyu Festa Live at Budokan Dec. 24 (Best Hit Alfee Final 2016 冬フェス Live at BUDOKAN Dec.24; December 9, 2017)
- 31st Summer Best Hit Alfee 2017 Natsu Festa Yokohama Arena 29.July.2017 (31st Summer Best Hit Alfee 2017 夏フェスタ YOKOHAMA ARENA 29.July.2017; December 29, 2017)
- 31st Summer Best Hit Alfee 2017 Natsu Festa Yokohama Arena 30.July.2017 (31st Summer Best Hit Alfee 2017 夏フェスタ YOKOHAMA ARENA 30.July.2017, December 29, 2017)
- Best Hit Alfee Final 2017 Fuyu Festa Live at Budokan Dec. 24 (Best Hit Alfee Final 2017 冬フェスタ Live at BUDOKAN Dec.24; December 8, 2018)
- 45th Anniversary Summer Best Hit Alfee 2018 Natsu no Maki Château of The Alfee Yokohama Arena 28.July (45th Anniversary Summer Best Hit Alfee 2018 夏ノ巻 Château of The Alfee YOKOHAMA ARENA 28.July; December 29, 2018)
- 45th Anniversary Summer Best Hit Alfee 2018 Natsu no Maki Château of The Alfee Yokohama Arena 29.July (45th Anniversary Summer Best Hit Alfee 2018 夏ノ巻 Château of The Alfee YOKOHAMA ARENA 29.July; December 29, 2018)
- 45th Anniversary Best Hit Alfee Final 2018 Fuyu no Maki Château of The Alfee III Live at Budokan Dec. 24 (45th Anniversary Best Hit Alfee Final 2018 冬ノ巻 Château of The Alfee III Live at BUDOKAN Dec.24; October 27, 2019)
- 45th Anniversary Summer Best Hit Alfee 2019 Natsu no Ran Battle Starship Alfee Makuhari Messe 3.August.2019 (45th Anniversary Summer Best Hit Alfee 2019 夏の乱 Battle Starship Alfee Makuhari Messe 3.August.2019; December 29, 2019)
- 45th Anniversary Summer Best Hit Alfee 2019 Natsu no Ran Battle Starship Alfee Makuhari Messe 4.August.2019 (45th Anniversary Summer Best Hit Alfee 2019 夏の乱 Battle Starship Alfee Makuhari Messe 4.August.2019; December 29, 2019)
- 45th Anniversary Best Hit Alfee Final 2019 Fuyu no Ran Battle Starship Alfee III (45th Anniversary Best Hit Alfee Final 2019 冬の乱 Battle Starship Alfee III; December 23, 2020)
- 46th Birthday Eve Natsu no Yume 2020.8.24 (46th Birthday Eve 夏の夢 2020.8.24; January 29, 2021)
- 46th Birthday Natsu no Yume 2020.8.25 (46th Birthday 夏の夢 2020.8.25; January 29, 2021)
- Best Hit Alfee 2020–2021 Love & Hope Aki no Yume Fuyu no Yume (BEST HIT ALFEE 2020-2021 LOVE & HOPE 秋の夢 冬の夢; November 22, 2021)
- Oretachi no Budōkan 2020 (俺たちの武道館2020; August 25, 2022)
- 2021 Summer Baby, Come Back! 31.July.2021 (December 10, 2022)
- 2021 Summer Baby, Come Back! 1.August.2021 (December 10, 2022)

== BE∀T BOYS Discography ==
Singles

- [1981.08.05] Stars☆On 23 (スターズ☆オン23) (BEAT BOYS)
- [1988.11.02] HE∀RTBRE∀K LONELY R∀IN
- [1989.05.31] Dare Yori mo Lady Jane (誰よりもLady Jane; Lady Jane Over Anyone Else)
- [1990.07.21] Futari Dake no Yoru (ふたりだけの夜; Night for Only Us)
- [1996.04.03] Epicurean (エピキュリアン)
- [1997.03.19] May Be

Albums

- [1988.10.21] BE∀T BOYS TOJO!!
- [1989.07.05] GO!GO! BE∀T BOYS!!

Videos

- [1989.10.21] GRE∀T PROMOTION
