= Ultraman Nexus (character) =

- Ultra Series character
- Ultraman Nexus in Anphans as portrayed in the Crunchyroll poster of his series.
- First appearance: Ultraman Nexus (2004)
- Created by: Keiichi Hasegawa
- Designed by: Hiroshi Maruyama (all forms)
- Portrayed by: Keiji Hasegawa (The Next); Daisuke Terai; Hideyoshi Iwata
- Voiced by: Japanese: Hideyuki Tanaka (The Next); Yasunori Masutani (Nexus); Koichi Toshima (2015); English: Joe Chambrello (William Winckler Productions)

In-universe information
- Aliases: Ultraman Noa (true form); Ultraman The Next (devolved form); Ultraman Nexus (devolved form); Ultraman; Noa; Legendary Giant
- Species: Ultra
- Gender: Male
- Weapon: Armed Nexus; Arrow Armed Nexus; Noa Aegis
- Origin: Unknown

Ultraman Nexus (ウルトラマンネクサス, Urutoraman Nekusasu) is the titular character of the 2004-2005 Ultra Series Ultraman Nexus. His true form is the legendary warrior Ultraman Noa (ウルトラマンノア, Urutoraman Noa), he chased his twisted doppelgänger Dark Zagi and managed to defeat the villain but the battle cost him his true form, causing him revert first into Ultraman The Next (ウルトラマン・ザ・ネクスト, Urutoraman Za Nekusuto) where he chased the Space Beast, Beast the One to Earth and bonded with an Air Force pilot named Shunichi Maki. Five years later in 2009, he evolved into Ultraman Nexus and bonded with several hosts, called Dunamists to fight against a wave of Space Beasts and the dark giants. When Dark Zagi rose to prominence once more, Nexus bonded with Kazuki Komon and regained his true form, Noa, defeated the evil warrior and finally killed him for good.

Nexus has become the main Ultra Warrior in the ULTRA N PROJECT media of the Ultra Series and continues to appear in later installments in this form despite his true and strongest form being Noa, although the latter did have several appearances. A distinction of Nexus from the other Ultra Warriors is his Energy Core, which he retained in all of his forms, which is used as the main logo of the ULTRA N PROJECT. As Noa, he is acknowledged by the franchise to be the oldest Ultra in existence at the age of 350,000 years old, surpassing Ultraman King from Ultraman Leo whose age is 300,000 years old.

Ultraman Nexus' grunts were provided by Yasunori Masutani (増谷 康紀, Masutani Yasunori), who did Noa's grunts as well. As Ultraman The Next, he was voiced by Hideyuki Tanaka (田中 秀幸, Tanaka Hideyuki), the current voice actor of Zoffy in the Heisei Era of Ultra Series. In the series, Ultraman Nexus was played by suit actors Daisuke Terai (寺井 大介, Terai Daisuke), who was also Ultraman Noa's suit actor and sometimes by Hideyoshi Iwata (岩田 栄慶, Iwata Hideyoshi), the suit actor of dark giants Dark Faust, Dark Mephisto and Dark Zagi. For Ultraman The Next, his suit actor was Keiji Hasegawa (長谷川 恵司, Hasegawa Keiji).

== Character Conception ==
The prototype design for Junis Modes of Ultraman Nexus, drawn by Hiroshi Maruyama.

All of Nexus' forms (including The Next and Noa), were designed by Hiroshi Maruyama. His original design was meant to be neutral but was soon enhanced with Japanese clothing. Nexus's head resembled the kabuto helmet and his entire body is based on hakama. The black lining on his body was themed after calligraphy. When he transforms into Junis, the suit would feature another resemblance to kamishimo. Hiroshi Maruyama had also proposed three design variations for Junis Modes for Ultraman Nexus.

Ultraman Nexus, alongside the series itself, was originally meant to be named Ultraman Cross. Reminiscing on his younger days in Chigasaki, Kanagawa, producer Hiroyasu Shibuya remembered the Hakone Ekiden, which is a popular relay marathon races held between Tokyo and Hakone in Japan on 2 and 3 January, around the New Year and decided to use the sport as the plann for Dunamists, Nexus' Ultra Hosts that passed the baton of Ultraman to each other in a similar way to said participants. It also refers to Kazuki Komon, the series' main character, who has made multiple connections with every Dunamists he came across and eventually envisioned the series as a "mystery relay race". When still in the Ultraman Cross stages, the protagonist was never meant to be a member of an attack team and said team was originally meant to be a bunch of drop-outs, who eventually ranked up into a first-class team, fitting with the series' main theme, "to connect the bonds". According to Yuichi Abe, the production team also thought of the "Meta-Field" concept, which involves fighting in an alternate dimension, becoming one of the plot points of the story, considering that not many characters in the story had any awareness of either Ultraman or the monsters.

Ultraman The Next's first appearance in the movie is made to look deliberately incomplete. The director [Kazuya Konaka] asked me to design what he called a ‘mutant Ultraman’. In his first incarnation, the face and body of The Next were molded to look almost exactly like the clay demo model I built, meaning that all of the little dips and imperfections were retained. But the Bible says that man was originally made out of clay, right?

— Comments from designer Hiroshi Maruyama, SciFi JAPAN.

Ultraman The Next's design was combined from Ultraman Nexus and the original Ultraman's Type A and Type B suits. The Next's Anphans mode was particularly based on Ultra Type A, due to their similar "wrinkled" appearances. Before his suit was made, a clay model of the Next was sculpted. Maruyama stressed the difficulty of reinventing the Ultraman design, stating, "Ultraman is a very simple design. This, unfortunately, removed some of the simplicity which is a big part of the design's charm. But it really can't be helped. If you tried to remove anything form that design what would you have? It would look like Pepsi Man!" Maruyama originally wanted to give Ultraman "transparent skin" with "glowing streams of red energy" but stated that the executives found the idea "a bit too shocking". Keeping director Konaka's concept of "mutant Ultraman" in mind, Maruyama also emphasizes the image of lava instead of muscles and blood vessels, with Anphans being based on solidified cold lava whereas Junis is burning red.

Ultraman Noa's design was proposed to be a break away from conventional designs of Ultra Warriors. His original design lacked the Noa Aegis on his back. Another break from the tradition was his energy core, which was located in the same place where an Ultra Warriors' Color Timer was supposed to be. The suit also has silver plating in addition to the color paint, but because the paint took time to dry, Noa's first photo session had his suit with visible fingerprints and scratches.

=== Name ===
Ultraman Nexus was never mentioned by his full name through most of the series, only being called "Ultraman" or the "giant of light". His personal name, Nexus was brought up by Kazuki Komon in the final episode after inheriting the Ultra's light. As the Next, it was a code name by Sara Mizuhara due to him being a countermeasure against Beast the One. As Ultraman Noa, his name was derived from the prophet in the Abrahamic religions, Noah.

== History ==
=== Ultraman Noa: Battle of Dream ===
Known as the legendary giant that protected the galaxy in ancient times, eventually gaining the title Legendary Superman (伝説の超人, Densetsu no Chōjin). 20,000 years prior to Ultraman Nexus, Nebula M80 of the globular cluster of Scorpius is at the edge of extinction from the attacks of Space Beasts, carnivorous monsters whose sole purpose in existence was to feed on the fears of other beings. Noa engaged in a fierce fight against these monsters, bonding with various beings called Dunamists, whose desired to protect those closest to them, giving the silver giant the strength he needed to fight. Exhausted from the battle, Noa descended into a long slumber and at that time a group of alien beings (who would be called the "Visitors") attempted to create a protector of their own, known as Ultinoid Zagi. This giant was inspired from Ultraman Noa but once awakened, he developed a twisted consciousness upon discovering his status as a fake Ultraman and began to rampage as Dark Zagi. This leaves his creators with no choice but to destroy their own planet by detonating their sun, in an attempt to destroy their mistake.

Dark Zagi, however, survived and entered a portal that was created by said explosion, leading him towards the Universe of the Land of Light in the Nebula M78, facing the Ultra Brothers while leading his own army of monsters. The Land of Light at that time was in an era of crisis and during the confrontation with the Ultra Brothers, Zagi briefly held Zoffy as a hostage. Noa joined forces with the Space Garrison and finally sent both himself and Zagi back to their dimension. While Zagi lost his physical form, Noa sealed the dimensional portal with Noa The Final but the cost was being reverted into Ultraman the Next.

=== Ultraman The Next ===
Ultraman The Next in Anphans vs Beast the One in Reputiria

Pursuing the Space Beast called The One to Earth in 2004, The Next soon bonded with Air Force pilot Shunichi Maki, a family man whose only wish was to take his son on a flight before his possible death from an incurable disease. When Maki was used as bait to lure The One, he soon transformed into The Next, using his newfound power to defend himself before The One retreated and the Ultra reverted to Maki from his injuries. Although refusing to transform again, Maki used The Next once more to fight Beast the One in a tunnel and rescue a mother-child pair from a falling building, simultaneously evolved into Junis Mode. As this form was bigger than before, The Next engaged in a final battle against The One, receiving support from the Air Force and finally defeated the One with the Evol Ray Schtrom beam attack. In the aftermath, The Next separated from Maki and fully healed him before going into a deep slumber.

=== Ultraman Nexus ===
In 2008 (the story eventually progressed to 2009 for the finale), The Next reawakened and evolved into Nexus. He first bonded with former cameraman Jun Himeya. Through this bond, it provided Nexus with the ability to evolve into Junis. Despite his mission to fight against the Space Beasts and save civilians, he was treated as a monster by the Night Raiders except one of them, Komon, who saw him as an ally due to being saved by the Ultraman before and the two became fast friends. Nexus faced several trials and his strength was put to test when facing against Dark Faust and Dark Mephisto. In addition, because of his ties to Nexus, Himeya was caught by the TLT and forced to be used in an experiment in creating a weapon that is capable of taking down the Space Beast.

Ultraman Nexus Junis vs Dark Mephisto

Although he managed to escape, the Illustrator warned him that due to his body condition, one more transformation would kill him. In the Land of the Dead, Nexus fought against Kutuura with Himeya's long time friend who was held captive by Dark Mephisto but his injuries took effect and in the aftermath, he was captured and seemingly died from the depletion of his energy. The Night Raiders entered the land of the dead and managed to defeat Kutuura with the Ultimate Vanisher, a new beam weapon developed from Nexus' energy beam. Through Himeya's renewed spirit, Nexus was partially revived but while still in weakened state, the Night Raiders used the Ultimate Vanisher's last bit of energy to revive Nexus, allowing the Ultra Warrior to turn the tables and defeat Mephisto but seemingly died in the explosion. Before departing, Himeya had a last talk with Komon and reassured him that the light would be passed on to someone else.

Ultraman Nexus Junis Blue killing a second Galberos.

The baton of light was soon passed to Ren Senjyu, a child who was born from an experiment who worked in an amusement park. Nexus bonded with the youth and received Junis Blue as a result. In a similar way to Himeya, Ren befriended with Komon, who was also aware of the latter's inheritance to Nexus' light and alongside other Night Raiders, he revolted the TLT's decision to have Ren be a test subject like Himeya was. Junis Blue also fought Mephisto Zwei, a Dark Mephisto clone from a corrupted Memory Police officer. During this battle, Nexus gained assistance from the original Mephisto (who wished to redeem himself) and the latter sacrificed himself to have the warrior of light kill his clone. However, his final days as a Dunamist nearing close, due to the flaws in his DNA during his creation. In a similar state to his predecessor Himeya, Ren's condition affected his prowess when fighting against Ezmael, a combination of past Space Beasts until Night Raiders provide cover for him long enough to come up with a new attack that could finally defeat the monster. Nexus soon ended their merger and Ren survived due to the cure for his condition.

As the light choose Nagi, the deputy captain of Night Raider, the villain, prior called Unknown Hand, revealed himself, and that he had orchestrated the incidents during the series' course and did so for Nagi to gain the light. With few available TLT forces left, they faced Unknown but an enraged Nagi transformed into Nexus, which lead to her capture and Unknown Hand's resurrection into Dark Zagi. His revival caused simultaneous Space Beast attacks worldwide while he was rampaging in Japan. Komon managed to save Nagi and his actions lead him to inherit of Nexus' light. Transforming into the giant, Komon used all of Nexus' past forms with memories of his predecessors encouraging him to keep on fighting until he evolved into the true form that Nexus had lost long ago, Ultraman Noa. As Noa, Komon easily overpowered Zagi in terms of strength and quickly finished him off when their beams clashed with each other.

=== Dreams ===
In a novel that was bundled with the release of Ultraman Nexus TV Complete DVD Box, three years after Dark Zagi's destruction (2012), Komon was appointed to the captain of Japan's branch of the Night Raider with Noa having already left him. However, when an unknown man revealed himself to be the Dark Giant, Dark Lucifer, both him and Nagi bonded with Ultraman Noa once more to counter this threat.

=== Subsequent appearances ===
- Ultraman Zero: The Revenge of Belial (2010): In this movie, Ultraman Noa was revealed to have been created the Shield of Baradhi, which placed alongside his statue underneath the surface of the Planet of Mirrors. When Run, Nao and Emerana tried to retrieve it, the shield crumbled to dust due to its age but soon appeared for real when the resistances do not surrender to Belial's tyranny, causing Ultraman Noa to appear in Zero's mind, reviving him and providing the young warrior with the Shield of Baraj's true form: Ultimate Aegis. With the shield itself, Zero was able to turn the tables against Belial and killed him with a single blow.
- Ultraman Ginga S The Movie (2015): Nexus was among the Heisei Ultras that were held captive by Etelgar until the UPG members freed them. While the other Heisei Ultras made their way to the top Etelgar's tower, Nexus was forced to stay behind to fight against a replica of Dark Mephisto before joining other Heisei Ultras to destroy Etelgar's castle. According to the book Ultraman Ginga S Super Complete Works, Nexus (in Nexus form) was defeated and sealed by Arena and Etelgar. He was voiced by Kōichi Toshima (外島 孝一, Toshima Kōichi) and Joe Chambrello in the English Dub. As with all Heisei Ultraman, Nexus's dialogue is accompanied with him shouting the name of his attacks. This part was made intentional by movie director Koichi Sakamoto, who wants the young audiences (children) to remember their attacks.
- Ultraman X (2015): Nexus appeared in episode 20 of the series. Arrived on an alternate Earth after Space Beasts appeared in that universe first. Nexus bonded with Sayuri Tachibana, Xio's lieutenant, to help her with defending her family in Canada against Bemular and assisted X in defeating a giant Bugbuzun Brood. Before departing, he told Daichi to never give up in his dreams and gave him a Cyber Card. In this episode, Nexus and X first met Bugbuzun Brood in Shinjuku before being taken into the Meta-Field. The city's skyline was recycled from Ultraman: The Next movie and initially the battle scene was meant to be in said city before the production team decided to film it in the Meta-Field instead.
- Ultraman X The Movie (2016): Nexus' card was among the Ultra Warrior Cyber Cards in Xio's possession. The Ultramen cards resonated with people's hopes and brought them to fight against Tsurugi Demaaga that rampaged worldwide. Nexus Junis Mode fought against one in Cairo, Egypt and like the rest of the Ultra Warriors, he was given an additional power boost to destroy the monsters. The Ultra Warriors later regrouped, meeting with X before leaving.
- Ultraman Z (2020): Nexus' power inhabited the Ultraman Nexus Medal (ウルトラマンネクサスメダル, Urutoraman Nekusasu Medaru), one of the many Ultra Medals developed on the Land of Light. After its theft and destruction of Genegarg on Earth, Nexus was among those salvaged by GAFJ and retrieved by Ultraman Z, using it alongside Cosmos and Mebius to execute Lightning Generade (ライトニングジェネレード, Raitoningu Jenerēdo).

== Profile ==
Ultraman Nexus's statistics below were never mentioned in the original series, but were brought up in magazines and official websites:

- Height: micro ~ 49 m (can also shrink to 10 ~ 20 m, depending on locations)
- Weight: 40,000 t (Anphans), 44,000 t (Junis), 42,000 t (Junis Blue)
- Flight Speed: Mach 3 (Anphans), Mach 4 (Junis), Mach 5 (Junis Blue)
- Time Limit: 3 minutes (in Meta Field)
- Birthplace: Unknown
- Year Debut: 2004
- First Appearance: Ultraman Nexus (2004)

=== Description ===
As the official website of Tsuburaya Productions stated: "An Ultraman whose power is transformed by the Dunamists. The baton of Dunamist has been passed to multiple individuals such as news cameraman Jun Himeya, amusement park worker Ren Senjyu, TLT-J Vice Captain Nagi Saijyo and officer Kazuki Komon. Ultraman Nexus' final ultimate form is Ultraman Noa"

=== Transformation ===
The Dunamists transform into Nexus via the Evoltruster (エボルトラスター, Eborutorasutā), a dagger like object, by removing its sheath and raises the blade upwards.

=== Features and weapons ===
- Energy Core (エナジーコア, Enāji Koa): An organ which bears the bow-shaped insignia and is the power source of Nexus power. It functions in a similar manner to an Ultra Warrior's standard Color Timer and blinks when Nexus reaches his limits. Aside from being a power source, several of Nexus' attacks are directly channeled through said organ.
- Core Gauge (コアゲージ, Koa Gēji): A Color Timer-like organ which is spotted in Nexus' Junis modes. It functions like a normal Color Timer, notifying the Ultra Warrior of his time limit when entering Meta Field.
- Armed Nexus (アームドネクサス, Āmudo Nekusasu): A pair of bracers on Nexus' arms, which provided him with multiple techniques and attacks. Underneath these bracers are Elbow Cutter (エルボーカッター, Erubō Kattā) blade protrusions which can be used for melee combat or generating beam projectiles.
  - Arrow Armed Nexus (アローアームドネクサス, Arō Āmudo Nekusasu): Once assuming Junis Blue, the right Armed Nexus transforms into the Arrow Armed Nexus. The bracer possess four modes, with one being its default form and the other three initiate corresponding attacks.

=== Forms and abilities ===
Unlike most Ultras, Nexus' flight method did not require him to perform hand maneuvers. All of Nexus' available forms can be strengthened once entering the Meta Field (メタフィールド, Meta Fīrudo) but decrease should he entered the Dark Field (ダークフィールド, Dāku Fīrudo) or Zagi's variation, Dark Field G (ダークフィールドG, Dāku Fīrudo Jī).

- Anphans (アンファンス, Anfansu): Ultraman Nexus's default mode, it grants the user all of the most basic powers and is always present when first transforming. All other modes must be shifted into instead of appearing automatically and usually used by any Dunamists. Along with being Nexus' most basic form, he also has a limited amount of time to fight in this mode. His finisher attack in this form is Cross Ray Schtrom (クロスレイ・シュトローム, Kurosu Rei Shutorōmu). It also can use the Energy Core activate a hidden function called Core Final (コアファイナル, Koa Fainaru), allowing Nexus to unleash his hidden energy. This technique was used by Himeya in episode 24 to partially revive Nexus, director's cut version of episode 29 by Ren to escape from Banpira's webbing and in final episode by Komon to evolve Nexus to his Junis forms and finally regaining Ultraman Noa.
- Junis (ジュネッス, Junessu): An evolved form of Ultraman Nexus from Anphans, gained through his bonding with Himeya. When in this mode, Nexus can utilize Phase Shift Wave (フェーズシフトウエーブ, Fēzu Shifuto Uēbu) summoning the Meta Field that transports himself and any opponent to an alternate dimension so that he can safely battle without causing damage to their surroundings. The analysis later showed that the Meta Field is actually a manifestation of the host's physical body, which was why every battle affected Himeya so greatly and continued to weaken him. Junis mode's ultimate attack is the Over Ray Schtrom (オーバーレイ・シュトローム, Ōbā Rei Shutorōmu), an L-shape beam attack fired from Nexus' right forearm and Core Impulse (コアインパルス, Koa Inparusu) through the use of Energy Core. This form is usually utilized by Himeya but was once used by Komon and Sayuri.
  - Crossover Formation (クロスオーバーフォーメーション, Kurosu Ōbā Fōmēshon): A momentary power boost that is nigh-identical to Ultraman Tiga's Glitter Tiga. Appeared in Ginga S The Movie, this form is used by all Heisei Ultras to empower their finishers and destroy Etelgar's castle.
- Junis Blue (ジュネッスブルー, Junessu Burū): An evolved version of the original Junis, which trades the red markings for a blue coloration and was acquired through Nexus' bonding with Ren Senjyu. This form retained the abilities used by Anphans and the original Junis, such as Cross Ray Schtrom and Board Ray Feather. This form reflects its user (Ren)'s disregard of his own safety due to his status as a short-lived human, hence the Junis Blue being generally sleeker and overall faster than the previous modes. He also gained the Arrow Armed Nexus, which allows him to use Schtrom Sword (シュトロームソード, Shutorōmu Sōdo) and utilize the energy bow attack Arrow Ray Schtrom (アローレイ・シュトローム, Arō Rei Shutorōmu). However, his strongest attack is by combining the former two attacks into the Over Arrow Ray Schtrom (オーバーアローレイ・シュトローム, Ōbā Arō Rei Shutorōmu). This form is generally used by Ren and was once utilized by Komon in his final battle against Dark Zagi before evolving into Ultraman Noa.

=== Ultraman the Next ===
- Height: 10 m (Anphans), 40 m (Junis)
- Weight: 2.5 ton (Anphans), 26,000 t (Junis)

The Next is Nexus' lowest forms possible, which was first shown after Noa used the ability Noa The Final, regressing him into this state. When chasing The One to Earth, he bonded with Shunichi Maki but was originally at his weakest form Anphans, he soon evolved into Junis with their merging being completed. Unlike other Dunamists after him, Maki transformed through sheer willpower.

- Anphans: The Next's original form, which is an analogous to Ultraman Type A and Nexus's Anphans. Because of his incomplete merging, The Next is only 10 meters tall, which was enough to face The One in Reputiria stage. The Next's fighting style involves the use of brute strength and normal physical attacks. His only ranged attack is Elbow Cutter (エルボーカッター, Erubō Kattā), which launches energy blade projection.
- Junis: The Next's evolved form, which is an analogous to Ultraman Type B and Nexus Junis. This form is achieved upon his complete merging with Maki, thus making its appearance higher and nearing close to Nexus. The Next gained a pair of bracers called Stratos Edge (ストラトスエッジ, Sutoratosu Ejji), which allows him to utilize energy-based attacks, such as Lambda Slasher (ラムダ・スラッシャー, Ramuda Surasshā), an improved variant of Anphans' Elbow Cutter. His finisher is Evol Ray Schtrom (エボルレイ・シュトローム, Eboru Rei Shutorōmu), which decomposes his opponents to molecular levels.

=== Ultraman Noa ===
Ultraman Noa

- Height: micro ~ 50 m (55 m with Noa Aegis)
- Weight: 55,000 t
- Age: 350,000 years old
- Flight speed: Unmeasurable
- Running speed: Mach 27
- Underwater speed: Mach 17
- Latent speed: Mach 15
- Jumping height: 10,000 m
- Grip strength: 250,000 t
- Brute strength: 220,000 t

The true form of Nexus, Noa is in fact the strongest of all previous forms and possess the Noa Aegis (ノアイージス, Noa Ījisu) on his back. He originally lost this form a long time ago after sealing a dimensional portal to the Land of Light via Noa The Final (ノア・ザ・ファイナル, Noa Za Fainaru) technique but regained it after multiple mergers with past Dunamists and the most recent one being Komon. In this form, Noa managed to turn the tables against his revived adversary, Dark Zagi and defeated him when their finishers clashed. Noa's finishing attack is called Lightning Noa (ライトニング・ノア, Raitoningu Noa), but has three stronger attacks, being the aforementioned Noa The Final, the dimensional travelling ability Dimension Noa (ディメンション・ノア, Dimenshon Noa) and the yet to be revealed Ultimate Noa (ウルティメイト・ノア, Urutimeito Noa).

=== Ultra Warriors with Nexus' powers ===
The list below refers to later Ultras who possess a replica of or inherited their powers from Ultraman Nexus or his strongest form, Noa.

- Ultimate Zero
- Ultraman Ginga Victory
- Ultraman X
  - Ultraman Zero Armor (indirectly via Ultimate Zero)
  - Ultraman Nexus Cyber Card
- Ultraman Orb Spacium Schtrom
- Ultraman Geed Noactive Succeed

== In other media ==
=== Video games ===
- Ultraman Nexus is one of the playable characters in the crossover game HEROES' VS. He is voiced by Takuji Kawakubo, the actor for Kazuki Komon.
- As a tie-in to the Ginga S Movie, a smartphone game was released, called the Ultra 10 Braves (ウルトラ10勇士, Urutora Jū Yūshi). Nexus was reimagined as the original ninja from Sanada Ten Braves, Nezu Jinpachi (根津 甚八), also called as Nexus (根草主, Nekusasu). His main weapon is a Yari.
- Ultraman Nexus is part of the characters in Ultraman:Be Ultra, a mobile game based on the Ultraman manga. He is represented as an Ultraman Suit modeled after his Junis Blue Mode.

== Dunamists ==
Dunamists (適能者(デュナミスト), Dyunamisuto; lit. "Chosen People") are beings who bonded with Nexus due to their willingness to risk themselves when protecting their loved ones from Space Beasts. All Dunamists exhibited the ability to use extrasensory perception and superhuman abilities. In Nexus' cases, they also gained the Blast Shot (ブラストショット, Burasuto Shotto), a gun which fires vacuum bullet ammunition and is also capable of exorcising dark influences on humans and creating a protective barrier. Although only demonstrated by Himeya, they also utilized a transportation called Stone Flugel (ストーンフリューゲル, Sutōn Furyūgeru) that can heal the injuries they sustained.

=== Shunichi Maki ===
Shunichi Maki
- Ultra Series character
- First appearance: Ultraman: The Next
- Created by: Tsuburaya Productions
- Portrayed by: Tetsuya Bessho

Shunichi Maki (真木 舜一, Maki Shun'ichi) is the first Dunamist on Earth, bonded with Noa's devolved form The Next and the main character of Ultraman: The Next 2004 movie.

An air force pilot whose content on flying with his ill son, Shunichi encountered the light, who was revealed to be Ultraman The Next and bonded with him. Although originally discharged, his connection to the light was soon exploited by BSCT in hopes of killing The One, a monster with a similar origin to Maki. When The One attacked BSCT's headquarters, it was then when Maki transformed into The Next in Anphans, successfully fending off against The One before it retreated. Maki reverted to himself after exhausted and chastised the team for using him as a life bait, though one of them, Sara stated that he was fated to be The One's enemy due to his inheritance of the strange light, dubbed as "The Next". Although BSCT offered Maki to assist them, he refused and wished to spend more time with his son. Promising the boy to take a flight with him again, Maki finally joined the BSCT in pursuing The One. When The One grew into a gigantic monster, Maki transformed into The Next and this time evolved into Junis, capable of fighting in a more stabilized form and finally put an end to The One's assaults by killing him with Evol Ray Storm. The Next severed his bonds with Maki and gave him another life force to fulfill his promise on taking his son to a flight.

Maki was briefly mentioned in episode 33 of Ultraman Nexus when Sara Mizuhara explained him to TLT-J members, now with their secrets were quickly discovered.

Shunichi Maki was portrayed by Tetsuya Bessho (別所 哲也, Bessho Tetsuya).

=== Jun Himeya ===
Jun Himeya
- Ultra Series character
- First appearance: Ultraman Nexus Episode 1: "Night Raid" (2004)
- Created by: Tsuburaya Productions
- Portrayed by: Yusuke Kirishima

Jun Himeya (姫矢 准, Himeya Jun) is the second Deunamist, first appeared in episode 1 to 24 before reappearing in the finale.

He was a serious, somewhat brooding individual, not given to trusting institutions such as the Night Raiders. He eventually struck up some sort of kinship with Komon, rescuing him from danger a few times. Himeya was a photojournalist, specializing in war photos. During one assignment (presumably somewhere in Southeast Asia), he was injured and subsequently treated by an orphan named Sera. tragically, Sera was caught up in armed conflict, and was killed as she rushed towards Himeya. A distraught Himeya returned; ironically, he became famous for the collection of pictures he took. Sometime after, Himeya encountered the Light. Trying to make up for what he was unable to do in the past, Himeya used the power of the Light to protect humanity and battle the Space Beasts, sacrificing everything within battle. After a climactic battle with Dark Mephisto, Himeya is presumed to have died; at the end of the series, the viewer learns that Himeya had survived, very much alive and well.

Jun Himeya was portrayed by Yusuke Kirishima (桐島 優介, Kirishima Yusuke). While planning, the crew also thought up of mature side for the characters. One such example was Jun Himeya, who they thought up of using the Devilman concept by having the character drunk with power and somewhat having internal conflicts with himself. This darker concept been had long planned but was forced to be scrapped due to the events of September 11 attacks and instead created a milder storyline which came into realization as Ultraman: The Next.

=== Ren Senjyu ===
Ren Senjyu
- Ultra Series character
- First appearance: Ultraman Nexus Episode 26: "The Third" (2005)
- Created by: Tsuburaya Productions
- Portrayed by: Masato Uchiyama

Ren Senjyu (千樹 憐, Senju Ren) is the third Dunamist, receiving the Light after Himeya's disappearance.

Outwardly, he is cheerful, optimistic and simple to the point of ditsy — this, however, conceals his past experiences. Ren is not a normal human, but rather a 'son of Prometheus': a human created through genetic engineering under the flag of "Prometheus Project" (an experiment performed in Dallas, Texas in the United States). He has faster reflexes, physical strength and ESP than a normal human. However, Ren suffered from a genetic imbalance in his DNA which cuts his lifespan to only 17–18 years. His only hope to prolong his life was a drug known only as 'Raphael'. Running away from the institute in Dallas, Ren came to Japan hoping to live his last days as a 'normal' human, but instead encountered the Light and become Nexus' third Dunamist. By the end of the series, Ren survived and presumably continues to live a normal life in Japan.

Ren Senjyu was portrayed by Masato Uchiyama (内山 眞人, Uchiyama Masato).

=== Nagi Saijyo ===
Nagi Saijyo
- Ultra Series character
- First appearance: Ultraman Nexus Episode 1: "Night Raid" (2004)
- Created by: Tsuburaya Productions
- Portrayed by: Yasue Sato

Nagi Saijyo (西条 凪, Saijō Nagi) is the deputy captain of the Night Raiders.

She is very strict, especially to Komon and can be quite brutal in certain situations. She hates Space Beasts, stemming from incidents regarding her childhood and her former lover Shinya Mizorogi, the former deputy leader of the team. When she was younger, her parents were murdered by a Space Beast (In the end revealed as Dark Zagi in human form). After she joined the Night Raiders to fulfill her vow to destroy the beings that killed her mother, she met and eventually fell in love with Mizorogi Shinya, the former deputy leader of Night Raider. When Mizorogi fell to the dark side, she deepened her hatred and was willing to do anything to bring down a Space Beast, which she does not know that the hatred is actually a trap set up by Dark Zagi to make her surrender all of the light to him when she became a Dunamist. In the final episode, she is saved by Komon when the darkness tries to devour her.

Nagi Saijyo was portrayed by Yasue Sato (佐藤 康恵, Satō Yasue). According to the production crew, Nagi was meant to be Komon's savior in the past. To completely shroud the character, she was given the appearance of Himeya's shadow while retaining a Night Raider glove. This plan however never came to realization after the series was forced to be ended quickly due to poor ratings.

=== Kazuki Komon ===
Kazuki Komon
- Ultra Series character
- First appearance: Ultraman Nexus Episode 1: "Night Raid" (2004)
- Created by: Tsuburaya Productions
- Portrayed by: Takuji Kawakubo

Kazuki Komon (孤門 一輝, Komon Kazuki) is the main viewpoint character and sometimes narrator of the series.

Komon is a kind-hearted, straightforward person who is always willing to help others. Before he was recruited by TLT, Komon was from a rescue team. When Komon was a child, he fell into a river and almost drowned, only to be rescued by a mysterious person he believes to be an alien. Because of the incident, Komon decided to help others and joining the Night Raiders was a good opportunity to do so. He is later revealed to be the last Dunamist chosen by The Light. Because of his interaction with the first two Dunamists enabling him to inherit their light, during his battle against Dark Zagi not only he was able to switch to both Junis and Junis Blue modes, but he was able to evolve into his ultimate form: Ultraman Noa.

Kazuki Komon is portrayed by Takuji Kawakubo (川久保 拓司, Kawakubo Takuji). Komon is already considered as an important character during the show's planning, as the production crew compared his meeting newer Dunamists and befriended them in a similar manner to the Dunamists' concept of "relay race". During the audition of said characters, the production crew asked the actors to describe "hero" from their own point of view. Takuji Kawakubo answered, "It's a longing. Its what you want yourself to become." This eventually made Komon as the final Dunamist of the series.

=== Sayuri Tachibana ===
Sayuri Tachibana
- Ultra Series character
- First appearance: Ultraman X Episode 1: "Voice from the Starry Sky" (2015)
- Created by: Tsuburaya Productions
- Portrayed by: Sarara Tsukifune

Sayuri Tachibana (橘 さゆり, Tachibana Sayuri) is the 40-year-old female deputy captain of Xio, an expert in search and rescue missions and a tactical leader due to her past as a member of a rescue team. She is also observant of Xio members and acts as a parental figure despite her stoic demeanor. She has two daughters, who immigrated to Canada with Tachibana's husband due to safety measures. In episode 20, she was temporary elected as the sixth Dunamist by Ultraman Nexus, using the opportunity to rescue her family in Canada and helped Ultraman X fight Bugbuzun Brood. Her temporary bonding with Nexus leaves her a clue to Ultraman X's identity.

Sayuri Tachibana is portrayed by Sarara Tsukifune (月船 さらら, Tsukifune Sarara). The reason Sayuri was chosen as a Dunamist is a tribute to Nagi Saijyo from Ultraman Nexus, who was planned to have a deeper plot involvement as the fourth Dunamist but was quickly cancelled and given a slight chance in the final episode due to the series' poor ratings.

== Reception ==
=== Critical Commentary ===
During an interview with the production crew of Ultraman Nexus, Yuichi Abe noted that the most surprising part for Nexus was how the Ultra's human host changed from time to time, which was considered an original concept of the show. Kazuya Konaka also added that had the series not been shortened, he would have expanded said concept.

=== Popularity ===
In the Ultra Series' 45th anniversary (2011), Nexus was placed tenth in the popularity poll and ranked sixth in 2013 with a total of 4084 voters.

=== Merchandise ===
Ultraman Nexus himself had been sold several times as soft-vinyl figures by Bandai. Nexus received his own articulated action figure in Tsuburaya's ULTRA-ACT, with the first one is Junis, which released on February 27, 2013 and Junis Blue on July 27, 2013. Junis Blue itself is a remold of the original Junis' figure. Ultraman Noa's figure was released in January 2014 as a P-Bandai exclusive release, with his figure being a remold of Dark Zagi, who was released a month earlier in December 2013.
