= List of Ultraman X characters =

This is the character list of 2015 Ultra Series Ultraman X.

== Xio ==
The Xeno Invasion Outcutters (ゼノインベージョンアウトカッターズ, Zeno Inbējon Autokattāzu), abbreviated as Xio (ジオ, Jio), is a team under the Earth defense organization UNVER and is based at the Operation Base X (オペレーションベースX, Operēshon Bēsu Ekkusu). According to the documentary episode, counting the maintenance staffs as well, the total number of workers in Operation Base X is 2700 people. As of the final episode, Daichi's relation to Ultraman X had been disclosed and the Ultra Warrior is accepted into the team. Their catchphrase is "One for all, all for one".

The announcements and navigation voice for Xio technologies is voiced by Hibiku Yamamura (山村 響, Yamamura Hibiku).

=== Main members ===
==== Daichi Ozora ====
Daichi Ozora (大空 大地, Ōzora Daichi) is a 20-year-old youth from the Research and Development section lab team from Xio and the series' main protagonist. Despite his position, Daichi is allowed to go on undercover missions whenever needed. Daichi merges with and transforms into Ultraman X using the X Devizer (エクスデバイザー, Ekusu Debaizā) ever since his encounter with Demaaga.

Fifteen years prior to the series, he lost his parents during the Ultra Flare incident, thus leaving him with the Gomora Spark Doll and his mother's space communicator as their keepsakes. He becomes a researcher under the inspiration to find his missing parents and achieving a peaceful coexistence between mankind and monsters. In the finale, Daichi revealed his connection to X towards his teammates and was lost in the cyberspace after a fatal attack. He was rescued by Asuna and resonated with the Spark Dolls to defeat Greeza. Several months later in Ultraman X The Movie Daichi returned from his monster observation activity in Australia and participated in the campaign against Zaigorg.

Daichi Ozora is portrayed by Kensuke Takahashi (高橋 健介, Takahashi Kensuke). As a child, Daichi is portrayed by Leo Ichinose (一瀬 礼旺, Ichinose Reo).

==== Asuna Yamase ====
Asuna Yamase (山瀬 アスナ, Yamase Asuna) is a female Xio officer that is skilled in ground combat and practices martial arts. She is partnered with Daichi during undercover missions. Aged 19 year's old at the start of the series, Asuna celebrated her 20th birthday in episode 3. Despite her tomboyish attitude, Asuna aims to be more feminine and has a strong pride as a woman in the team. In the final episode, she rescued Daichi after he was trapped in cyberspace due to X's kamikaze attack in defeating Greeza.

In the combat field, Asuna usually drive the Land Musketty in against monsters. She becomes a stand-in partner for Cyber Gomora whenever Daichi transformed into X.

Asuna Yamase is portrayed by Akane Sakanoue (坂ノ上 茜, Sakanoue Akane).

==== Wataru Kazama ====
Wataru Kazama (風間 ワタル, Kazama Wataru) is the team's 24-year-old top sniper and expert in operating investigation vehicles. He is a clumsy man but deep inside his heart, he has a huge sense of justice. He is also a skilled pilot in space, beating Hayato, his rival, who is uncommonly good in aerial combat. In high school, Wataru was known to be a pro-rugby player and becomes a representative of Japan's national rugby team, now a member of Xio's Rugby Team during certain matches. He has been working in Xio for six years and has a little brother named Isamu that follows his footstep as a rugby player. In his free time, Wataru likes watching movies, especially romance films. Near the finale, Wataru was thought to be killed by Greeza alongside Mamoru but instead survived and managed to join their teammates in their final battle.

Wataru Kazama is portrayed by Yoshihiko Hosoda (細田 よしひこ, Hosoda Yoshihiko).

==== Hayato Kishima ====
Hayato Kishima (貴島 ハヤト, Kishima Hayato) is the 24-year-old pilot in the team. He considers Wataru to be his rival, yet they are paired by Captain Kamiki in undercover missions. Hayato often relies on logic and calculations, sometimes clashing with Wataru due to his hotheaded attitude. His hometown is in Nagano and his father works as a popular noodle seller. He wants to follow his father's path after his retirement from Xio. During Greeza's revival and Asuna travelling to cyberspace to rescue Daichi, Hayato assumed control of Cyber Gomora to fight against the villain before being defeated and join his comrades in a final stand against Greeza before Ultraman X revived.

Hayato Kishima is portrayed by Ukyo Matsumoto (松本 享恭, Matsumoto Ukyō).

==== Takeru Yamagishi ====
Takeru Yamagishi (山岸 タケル| Yamagishi Takeru) Takeru Yamagishi is one of Xio's main operators. Takeru is shown to be a bit cocky. He is also seen to have a good relationship with Hayato Kishima.

Takeru Yamagishi is portrayed by and named after Voyager band member TAKERU.

==== Chiaki Matsudo ====
Chiaki Matsudo (松戸 チアキ, Matsudo Chiaki) Chiaki Matsudo is one of Xio's main operators. Chiaki is shown to be a bit childish.

She is portrayed by and named after Voyager band member Chiaki Seshimo (瀬下 千晶, Seshimo Chiaki).

==== Sayuri Tachibana ====
Sayuri Tachibana (橘 さゆり, Tachibana Sayuri) is the 40-year-old female deputy captain of Xio, an expert in search and rescue missions and a tactical leader due to her past as a member of a rescue team. She is also observant of Xio members and acts as a parental figure despite her stoic demeanor. She has two daughters, who immigrated to Canada with Tachibana's husband due to safety measures. In episode 20, she was temporary elected as the sixth Dunamist by Ultraman Nexus, using the opportunity to rescue her family in Canada and helped Ultraman X fight Bugbuzun Brood.

Sayuri Tachibana is portrayed by Sarara Tsukifune (月船 さらら, Tsukifune Sarara). The reason Sayuri was chosen as a Dunamist is a tribute to Nagi Saijyo from Ultraman Nexus, who was supposedly to have a deeper plot involvement as the fourth Dunamist but was quickly cancelled and given a slight chance in the final episode due to the series' poor ratings.

==== Shotaro Kamiki ====
Shotaro Kamiki (神木 正太郎, Kamiki Shōtarō) is the 48-year-old Xio captain who also believes that humanity should peacefully coexist with monsters, a trait he shares with Daichi. 11 years prior to the story, he was an ace pilot of the Air Self-Defense Force and lost his wife in that same year from an incurable disease. He has a daughter named Hiromi, whom he was forced to leave behind due to his priorities as an officer. He blames himself for not having time to be with his daughter and felt depressed over it until Xio members reassure him. In reality, Hiromi never complained about it and respected the importance of his job. During his daughter's marriage, he wasn't able to attend it due to Gomess (S)'s attack on the urban city. He assumed control of Cyber Gomora and utilized boxing skills against Gomess (S). He keeps a picture which Hiromi drew in the past during his wife's death and always clinches to his uniform when facing a huge crisis. In Ultraman X The Movie, it seems that his relationship with his daughter started to improve.

Shotaro Kamiki is portrayed by Yuu Kamio (神尾 佑, Kamio Yū).

=== Lab Team ===
The Lab Team (ラボチーム, Rabo Chīmu) is a division whose purpose is to investigate phenomenon and create Xio arsenals. Daichi is also a part of this team, though his uniform also indicates that he is an officer on the battlefield.

==== Mamoru Mikazuki ====
Mamoru Mikazuki (三日月 マモル, Mikazuki Mamoru) is a 20-year-old genius scientist. He usually partners with Rui during research. Near the finale, Mamoru was thought to be killed by Greeza alongside Wataru but instead survived and managed to join their teammates in their final battle.

Mamoru Mikazuki is portrayed by Hayato Harada (原田 隼人, Harada Hayato).

==== Rui Takada ====
Rui Takada (高田 ルイ, Takada Rui) is an 18-year-old cheerful female genius scientist. She likes Eleking and Ultraman Zero, which sometimes lead to an argument with Daichi over their favorite monsters.

Rui Takada is portrayed by Haruka Momokawa (百川 晴香, Momokawa Haruka).

==== Dr. Gourman ====
Gluttonous Alien Alien Fanton "Dr. Gourman" (健啖宇宙人 ファントン星人 グルマン博士, Kentan Uchūjin Fanton Seijin Guruman-hakase) (Note: Official magazines and Bandai products label his race as "Alien Fanton" in rōmaji. As with all Aliens in the series, the Crunchyroll subtitle changed it with placing the "Alien"-suffix after their names (eg. "Fanton Alien").) is the creator of Xio's arsenal and combat vehicles. In addition, he has a large appetite and eats 13 meals a day. Although having watched Daichi's transformation as Ultraman X, he kept this secret to himself. During the finale, Gourman was thought to be killed by Greeza in his last attempt to defend the Spark Dolls but instead survived in the end.

During the events of Ultraman X The Movie, he was revealed to have created several Cyber Cards from past Ultra Warriors that fought alongside Ultraman X and Xio members. He also invented the Beta Capsule (ベータカプセル, Bēta Kapuseru) in hopes of summoning the original Ultraman but failed miserably and caused an explosion in the lab. Using the statue of Ultraman Tiga and the original Ultraman's knowledge, Gourman created their Cyber Cards, which resulted in the appearance of Beta Spark Armor.

Dr. Gourman is voiced by Yasunori Matsumoto (松本 保典, Matsumoto Yasunori) and is a tribute to Alien Fanton from episode 7 of Ultraman Mebius.

=== Mechas and vehicles ===
Xio members deployed three vehicles into the battle, called Xio Special Investigation Vehicles (Xio特捜車, Jio tokusō-sha) with each of them can combine with the combiner unit Xio Musketty (ジオマスケッティ, Jio Masuketti). Additionally, they can also use the power of Cyber Cards as armaments. At the start of the series, only a single Xio Musketty unit was developed but a second unit was made during Greeza's arrival on Earth, used as a sacrificial bullet against the destroyer. Ultraman X The Movie saw the development of two other units in order for all three Musketty vehicles to participate against Zaigorg and its cohorts. All vehicles are named after the main characters of Alexandre Dumas's The Three Musketeers.

- Xio Athos (ジオアトス, Jio Atosu): A Nissan Leaf-based investigation vehicle, its main armament is Athos Laser (アトスレーザー, Atosu Rēzā). By combining with Xio Musketty, Athos can become the fighter jet Sky Musketty (スカイマスケッティ, Sukai Masuketti) and utilizes Fanton Photon Guns (ファントン光子砲, Fanton Kōshi-hō). The fighter jet is themed after the triangle shape.
- Xio Aramis (ジオアラミス, Jio Aramisu): A Nissan NV200-based investigation vehicle, its main armament is Aramis Laser (アラミスレーザー, Aramisu Rēzā). By combining with Xio Musketty, Aramis can become the space shuttle Space Musketty (スペースマスケッティ, Supēsu Masuketti) and utilizes Fantonic Laser (ファントニックレーザー, Fantonikku Rēzā). Space Musketty was developed during X's abduction by Bemstar and later equipped with a second unit of Xio Musketty which possesses an advanced energy measurement unit in place of standard combat weapons. During the events of Ultraman X The Movie, it was revealed to have been armed with a cotton candy launcher by Rui which she used in halting Zaigorg's attack. The space fighter is themed after the circle shape.
- Xio Porthos (ジオポルトス, Jio Porutosu): An e-NT400-based investigation truck. By combining with Xio Musketty, Porthos can become the combat tank Land Musketty (ランドマスケッティ, Rando Masuketti) and utilizes Fanton Rail Cannon (ファントンレールキャノン, Fanton Rēru Kyanon). The combat tank is themed after the square shape.

=== Cyber Cards and Cyber Monsters ===
The Cyber Monsters (サイバー怪獣, Saibā Kaijū), also known as Cybernetic Monsters (電脳怪獣, Den'nō Kaijū), are artificial monsters stored within the Cyber Cards (サイバーカード, Saibā Kādo) created by Xio out of using Spark Dolls as its main basis. Originally, they were supposed to aid Xio in battling against monster threats but the development was briefly halted due to Cyber Gomora's part. Soon, these cards are utilized by Daichi to initiate MonsArmor, where the Cyber Monster combines with Ultraman X. While most cards usually house Cyber Monsters, but Type U categories instead house copies of Ultramen powers.

It was soon revealed that instead of only being copies to Spark Dolls, Cyber Monsters shares the same consciousness to their Spark Doll templates and materialization process not only requires brainwave synchronization, but also their approval to join their partner. This eventually allows Daichi to finally materializes Cyber Gomora to life. To materialize them, the Cyber Monster's Cyber Cards morph into Spark Dolls and the user "Realize" (リアライズ, Riaraizu) it. However, mental linking with a Cyber Monster can be fatal if used for a long time.

Outside its use as "biological weapons", Cyber Cards can also be used as ammunition in Xio's technologies and arsenal. Several of them were given Limiters (リミッター, Rimittā) within their program due to enormous power.

- Cyber Gomora (サイバーゴモラ, Saibā Gomora): Classified as Type G, Cyber Gomora was created from the data of Daichi's Gomora Spark Doll. It was supposedly brought to life at first but the process failed due to Gomora's part in refusal to prevent Daichi from being harmed. It was the first to be modified by Gourman in order to fit its MonsArmor function to X. Starting in episode 11, while Ultraman X battles King Joe, Daichi managed to reassure his partner and the materialization process successfully initiated. Its finisher attack is Cyber Super Oscillation Wave (サイバー超振動波, Saibā Chō Shindō-ha) where it delivers a large shockwave impulse. Alternatively, Cyber Gomora can be paired with Asuna or other Xio members like Captain Kamiki and Hayato should Daichi finds himself occupied. In Ultraman X The Movie, Cyber Gomora was used by Daichi in a failed attempt to stop Zaigorg's advance towards the stone of Baraji. Gomora's card was used by Asuna to maximize her Xio Bazooka, utilizing Gomora Oscillation Cannon (ゴモラ振動砲, Gomora Shindō-hō) to delay Gorg Fire Golza while Ultraman was recovering from the monster's attack.
- Cyber Eleking (サイバーエレキング, Saibā Erekingu): Classified as Type G, Cyber Eleking was created from the data of Eleking Spark Doll. It was modified by Rui in order to fit its MonsArmor function to X. In Xio's first attempt to hold Zaigorg from advancing, Mamoru used Eleking's card in conjunction with two parabolic antennae to utilize Eleking Energy Shield (エレキング・エナジーシールド, Erekingu Enajī Shīrudo) in hopes of imprisoning Zaigorg in a barrier while Xio members tried to destroy it, until the appearance of Gorg Antlar and Fire Golza turned the tables as they destroyed the parabolic antennae that imprisoned their masters.
- Cyber Telesdon (サイバーテレスドン, Saibā Teresudon): Classified as Type G, Cyber Telesdon was created from the data of Telesdon Spark Doll. By installing the card, it grants them its Lava Heatwave (溶岩熱線, Yōgan Nessen). It was first created and used in episode 4 in an operation to rescue Ultraman X from Bemstar, using Telesdon's lava to crack the bird monster's stomach.
- Cyber Bemstar (サイバーベムスター, Saibā Bemusutā): Classified as Type B, Cyber Bemstar was created from the data of Alien Zarab's Bemstar Spark Doll. It was modified for Ultraman X to utilize Bemstar Armor. While joining Tiga Sky Type and Sky Musketty against Gorg Antlar, Space Musketty used the card and initiated Bemstar Heaping Shield (ベムスタールイルイシールド, Bemusutā Ruirui Shīrudo), blocking Gorg Antlar's attack while Sky Musketty charged and destroyed its wings via Cyber Birdon's card.
- Cyber Zetton (サイバーゼットン, Saibā Zetton): Classified as Type G, Cyber Zetton was created from the data of Quila's Zetton Spark Doll. It was meant for X to use against the real Zetton but Quila activated a hidden malware that enslaved X as part of the plan to enact his revenge on Ultraman Max until Daichi purified the card with Cyber Eleking. In Ultraman X The Movie, Cyber Zetton's card was used by Wataru in Land Musketty against Gorg Fire Golza, utilizing Zetton Rail Cannon (ゼットンレールキャノン, Zetton Rēru Kyanon) through the removal of its Limiter to delay it while Ultraman recovered from the monster's attack.
- Cyber King Joe (サイバーキングジョー, Saibā Kingu Jō): Classified as Type M, Cyber King Joe was created from the data of King Joe Spark Doll. By installing the card, it grants them King Joe Dest-Ray Cannon (キングジョーデストレイ砲, Kingu Jō Desutorei Hō). It was first used in episode 19 by Sky Musketty to stop Daichi's Gomora from advancing towards an urban area. This card was used again in Xio's attempt to delay Zaigorg by Sky Musketty once more but failed due to Gorg Antlar and Fire Golza's intervention.
- Cyber Birdon (サイバーバードン, Saibā Bādon): Classified as Type B, Cyber Birdon was created from the data of Birdon Spark Doll. While joining Tiga Sky Type and Space Musketty against Gorg Antlar, Sky Musketty used the card and initiated Birdon Phoenix Attack (バードン・フェニックス・アタック, Bādon Fenikkusu Atakku) through the removal of its Limiter, shrouding the jet with flames and used it to crash Antlar's wings.
- Cyber Red King (サイバーレッドキング, Saibā Reddo Kingu): Classified as Type G, it was created from Red King's Spark Doll. This card was used again in Xio's attempt to delay Zaigorg by Land Musketty, utilizing Red King Armor-Piercing Bullet (レッドキング徹甲弾, Reddo Kingu Tekkōdan) but failed due to Gorg Antlar and Fire Golza's intervention.

== UNVER ==
The Ultimate Noxious event Versus Earth Ranger (究極の有害事象に対抗する地球レンジャー, Kyūkyoku no yūgai jishō ni taikō suru chikyū renjā; UNVER) is an organization founded after the Ultra Flare incident. The organization aims to locate, retrieve and secure unstable Spark Dolls for studying. It was established at the time of Ultra Flare when its predecessor team formed an alliance with the crash-landed group of Alien Fantons (Dr. Gourman's race of origin) in Mexico during their trip to outer space after their planet suffered from depletion of food supplies. Soon Xio was founded under its branch and allies with multiple friendly aliens as means of support. Their base of operation is in Geneva which was stated to be the world's biggest Spark Dolls containment facility, with the second place is in Xio Japan. Unfortunately, the base itself was under attacked by Greeza after absorbing all life forms nearby, including the Spark Dolls to assume its second form.

=== Daisuke Minamikawa ===
Daisuke Minamikawa (南川 大輔, Minamikawa Daisuke; 6, 7) is the chief of UNVER Japanese Branch, he first appeared after tE-rU accidentally destroyed the city with Rudian. During Gargorgon's arrival, he held no mercy for the fugitive and wanted him to be surrendered to the destroyer but stopped by Captain Kamiki. Eventually, after witnessing tE-rU's contribution when he participated in their plan to attack Gargorgon, Daisuke regains faith in Xio members and commended Kamiki for having a good team to manage. According to writer Hirotoshi Kobayashi, Daisuke is an old colleague of Kamiki and was the one who offered him the Captain position in Xio.

Daisuke Minamikawa was portrayed by Koichi Miura (三浦 浩一, Miura Kōichi).

== Ultras ==
=== Ultraman X ===
Ultraman X (above) and Ultraman Exceed X (bottom)

Ultraman X (ウルトラマンエックス, Urutoraman Ekkusu) is an Ultra from space who merges with Daichi as his host to combat against monster threats. While not in transformed state, he resides in the X Devizer, communicating with Daichi over time. Fifteen years prior to the series, he was chasing Greeza and defeated him by throwing him into the sun but in the end accidentally triggered the Ultra Flare incident, thus his body trapped in a form of computer data. He sensed a great frequency in Daichi, being the main reason X bonded with him. His finisher attack is Xanadium Ray (ザナディウム光線, Zanadiumu Kōsen), which capable of regressing his opponents to Spark Dolls instead of killing them.

After Ultraman X lost himself in the cyberspace following his defeat by Tsurugi Demaaga, Daichi ventured in and finds a rainbow which grants him the head-mounted Xlugger (エクスラッガー, Ekusuraggā) boomerang blade, allowing X to become Ultraman Exceed X (ウルトラマンエクシードX, Urutoraman Ekushīdo Ekkusu). The Xlugger is stored on his forehead and can be removed when in need. This form as well expels the Dark Thunder Energy that possessed the monsters.

Near the finale series, X revealed himself to Xio after Greeza headed towards Earth, seeking cooperation with Earth Defense Forces to fight him. Later in the fight, his relation to Daichi was revealed as well but with Greeza proven stronger, the two performed a kamikaze attack by letting themselves absorbed into Greeza and self-destructs, leaving X's Color Timer intact. However, he was revived thanks to Daichi's memory him, as well as Asuna whom managed to find the latter when he drifted in the cyberspace. Using the Hybrid Armor, X manages to defeat Greeza once and for all, preventing the Earth from its fated destruction. Despite still trapped as a computer data, X was later accepted into Xio, now being acknowledged as a member.

During the events of Ultraman X The Movie, X was defeated by Zaigorg and the X Devizer took a huge damage, rendering him untransformed for a moment until the appearance of Ultraman Tiga, which was transformed by Yuto healed the device and finally being able to join the battle once more. Joining with the original Ultraman and Ultraman Tiga, X fought against Zaigorg but once the monster captured the former two's energies, X gained Beta Spark Armor which he used to free them and empower the Ultra Warriors from the worldwide to destroy Tsurugi Demaaga before finishing Zaigorg. X separated from Daichi, revealing that throughout the battle he was able to regain his physical body and set his sight to depart from Earth. Before departing, he thanked Xio for their cooperation since the first time they met and reassured to Daichi that they will always stay united. Sometime later, he returned to Daichi after Desastro made its way to the planet.

Thanks to the upgrades installed by Dr. Gourman, Daichi can initiate MonsArmor (モンスアーマー, Monsuāmā) to combine X with Cyber Monsters.

- Gomora Armor (ゴモラアーマー, Gomora Āmā): The combination result of X and Cyber Gomora, X gains a pair of huge claws as his arsenal, which allows him to create digital shields for protection. His finisher attack is Gomora Oscillation Wave (ゴモラ振動波, Gomora Shindō-ha).
- Eleking Armor (エレキングアーマー, Erekingu Āmā): The combination result of X and Cyber Eleking, X gains a cannon as his arsenal, which allows him to manipulate electricity. His finisher attack is Eleking Electric Shock Wave (エレキング電撃波, Erekingu Dengeki-ha).
- Bemstar Armor (ベムスターアーマー, Bemusutā Āmā): The combination result of X and Cyber Bemstar, X gains an Arm Shield (アームシールド, Āmu Shīrudo) that resembles Bemstar's stomach gorge. The shield can be used as a claw appendage and initiates a finisher attack, Bemstar Spout (ベムスタースパウト, Bemusutā Supauto), where X redirects in incoming attack from the opponent back to them.
- Zetton Armor (ゼットンアーマー, Zetton Āmā): The combination result of X and Cyber Zetton, X gained a pair of huge arm guards/cannons on his hands. It was meant for X to use against the real Zetton but Quila activated a hidden malware that enslaved X as part of the plan to enact his revenge on Ultraman Max until Daichi purified the card with Cyber Eleking. Its main finishers are Zetton Tornado (ゼットントルネード, Zetton Torunēdo) and Zetton Flaming Bullet (ゼットン火炎弾, Zetton Kaen-dan).
- Hybrid Armor (ハイブリッドアーマー, Haiburiddo Āmā): The combination result of X and all MonsAmors, this armor appeared during the final battle against Greeza and wields the Xlugger. The main finisher is Ultimate Xanadium (ウルティメイトザナディウム, Urutimeito Zanadiumu), where X launches an X-shaped ray from his chest before launching the Xlugger. This form was a last minute addition made by Sei Okazaki in hopes of giving a huge impact to the audiences, while the original plan was to have Xio members utilizing the powers of Cyber Cards, which was later used in Ultraman X The Movie.

Apart from that, there are also alternatives to the MonsArmors, the Cyber Armor (サイバーアーマー, Saibā Āmā), which serve as copies of past Ultramen's powers:

- Ultraman Zero Armor (ウルトラマンゼロアーマー, Urutoraman Zero Āmā): The combination result of X and a copy of Ultraman Zero's Ultimate Aegis (ウルティメイトイージス, Urutimeito Ījisu), X gains the Ultimate Aegis and Ultimate Zero Sword (ウルティメイトゼロソード, Urutimeito Zero Sōdo) as his arsenal, which allows him to travel in-between dimensions. (Note: Also called in the series as "Ultimate Zero Armor" (ウルティメイトゼロアーマー, Urutimeito Zero Āmā).)
- Beta Spark Armor (ベータスパークアーマー, Bēta Supāku Āmā): An armor utilized by Ultraman Exceed X during his battle with Zaigorg, it serves as an analogy to Ultraman and Ultraman Tiga. His primary weapon is the Beta Spark Sword (ベータスパークソード, Bēta Supāku Sōdo), which is the combination of the X Beta Capsule (エクスベータカプセル, Ekusu Bēta Kapuseru) and the X Park Lence (エクスパークレンス, Ekusupāku Rensu) and allows him to turn into an arrow configuration and unleash the Beta Spark Arrow (ベータスパークアロー, Bēta Supāku Arō) as his finisher. When combining with Ultraman and Ultraman Tiga, he is capable of utilizing Cyber Wings (サイバーウィング, Saibā Wingu) that provided any Ultra Warriors from various locations on Earth with power boosts.

Ultraman X is voiced by Yuichi Nakamura (中村 悠一, Nakamura Yuichi). His design was made by Masayuki Gotou and was originally themed after Ultraseven but in hopes of invoking an "armor-wearing Ultraman", the original Ultraman's design was incorporated instead, though Ultraseven's design was shelved and reused in Exceed X's Xlugger. In addition to the series' cyberpunk motif, the 1982 science fiction film Tron movie was adapted as well.

=== Past Heisei Ultras and Ultra hosts ===
The following characters below are Heisei Ultras from the past series:

- Ultraman Zero (ウルトラマンゼロ, Urutoraman Zero; 5, X The Movie): See here
- Kaito Touma/Ultraman Max (トウマ・カイト／ウルトラマンマックス, Tōma Kaito/Urutoraman Makkusu; 8, X The Movie): Long ago, an Ultra Warrior that was fighting on an alternate Earth, he approached this continuity in the form of his former human host, having aware of Alien Sran "Quila" trying to sabotage Ultraman X. Exposing Quila's true plan and form in front of Xio, he discovered it too late as X had fallen under Quila's control and transformed to fight Zetton. After Daichi freed X from Cyber Zetton, the two quickly assist Max in fighting Zetton and Quila. With his mission ended, he lends them a portion of his power in a form of a Cyber Card before departing. This card was once used by X to summon Max Galaxy and reducing King Joe to scraps. Kaito Touma is reprised by Sota Aoyama (青山 草太, Aoyama Sōta).
- Ultraman Gingavictory (ウルトラマンギンガビクトリー, Urutoraman Gingabikutorī; 14): The combined form of Ultraman Ginga and Victory. It was accessed in a final battle against Gua Spectre alongside Ultraman Exceed X.
  - Sho/Ultraman Victory (ショウ／ウルトラマンビクトリー, Shō/Urutorman Bikutorī; 13, 14, X The Movie): Following his last fight with Juda Spectre, he was kidnapped into X's world alongside Arisa by Mold Spectre until they took refuge in Xio. Seeing Daichi/X's battle and learn of him from Ultraman Zero, he gave the boy a swordsmanship training and finally joined in fighting the Gua Army, assuming Ultraman Victory Knight (ウルトラマンビクトリーナイト, Urutoraman Bikutorī Naito) in against Alien Magma. He is reprised by Kiyotaka Uji (宇治 清高, Uji Kiyotaka).
  - Hikaru Raido/Ultraman Ginga (礼堂 ヒカル／ウルトラマンギンガ, Raidō Hikaru/Urutoraman Ginga; 13, 14, X The Movie): The main character of Ultraman Ginga and Ginga S. During Mold's attack, he sneaked into another portal made by Mold Spectre and eliminated the Gua Army's Armada before using it to get to X's world and assist his partner and Ultraman X. Hikaru Raido is reprised by Takuya Negishi (根岸 拓哉, Negishi Takuya).
- Ultraman Cosmos (ウルトラマンコスモス, Urutoraman Kosumosu; 14): Mentioned by Hikaru as one of the peaceful Ultraman to Daichi.
- Ultraman Gaia (ウルトラマンガイア, Urutoraman Gaia) and Ultraman Dyna (ウルトラマンダイナ, Urutoraman Daina): Alongside Tiga, their apparition appeared when Ultraman Gingavictory used their signature attacks, Photon Edge (フォトンエッジ, Foton Ejji) and Solgent Ray (ソルジェント光線, Sorujento Kōsen) against Gua Spectre.
- Ultraman Tiga (ウルトラマンティガ, Urutoraman Tiga; 14, X The Movie): See here
- Ultraman Nexus (ウルトラマンネクサス, Urutoraman Nekusasu; 20, X The Movie): See here

=== Past Showa Ultras and Ultra hosts ===
- Ultraman Ace (ウルトラマンエース, Urutoraman Ēsu), Ultraman Leo (ウルトラマンレオ, Urutoraman Reo) and Astra (アストラ, Asutora) (13): Three members of the Ultra Brothers that appeared in Sho's recollection scene in the fight against Juda Spectre.
- Ultraseven (ウルトラセブン, Urutora Sebun; 14): See here
- Ultraman (ウルトラマン, Urutoraman; X The Movie): See here

== Antagonists ==
=== Greeza ===
Void Monster Greeza (虚空怪獣 グリーザ, Kokū Kaijū Gurīza; 1, 4, 21, 22) is the primary antagonist of Ultraman X. Called the mysterious luminescent life form (謎の発光生命体, Nazo no Hakkō Seimei-tai) in the beginning, he is a sentient space void that had destroyed three planets which emitted biological life signs and sets the Solar System as his recent target. However, he was thrown into the sun by Ultraman X, creating the Ultra Flare and set forth the motion of the series. While thought to be dead, Greeza in fact survived his destruction and planned the Dark Thunder Energy (ダークサンダーエナジー, Dāku Sandā Enajī) attack on Earth while slowly recovering his strength, racing towards the Earth and contemplated to absorb the Spark Dolls to strengthen himself before destroying the Earth. Facing the Xio members and X, he battled them and easily overpowered the resistance until X performs a Kamikaze attack, which apparently killed both him and Greeza. However, Greeza survived the explosion and stole all of Xio's Spark Dolls to achieve its final form until X revived as well and with the help of the escaped Spark Dolls, they fused with X and destroyed Greeza once and for all.

Its first and initial form was a spiked ball, later evolved into a more humanoid second form after absorbing the Spark Dolls storage facility in UNVER Nevada Branch, which also allowed it to become a living space distortion. After absorbing Xio's Spark Doll, Greeza entered its final form, which gave it a spike armor and capable of manifesting the Spark Dolls' power for its own use.

=== Gargorgon ===
Petrification Evil Monster Gargorgon (石化魔獣 ガーゴルゴン, Sekika Majū Gāgorugon; 6, 7): An intelligent space life form, Gargorgon was once responsible for petrifying an ancient human civilization and sank it under the sea. She attacked Planet Gold in search of its energies and returned to Earth after tracking it but met resistance in the form of Ultraman X, Rudian and Earth Defense Force, UNVER and Xio. She petrifies Ultraman X and demands the Earth to give tE-rU to her in 44 minutes or else the Earth population will receive the same fate. However, refusing to obey to her superiority, Xio and UNVER resurrected X and thus, she was defeated by the Ultra in Bemstar Armor and Rudian. As theorized by Gourman, Gargorgon's arrival on Earth in the past may have inspired the Gorgon from Greek mythology.

Gargorgon was voiced by Russian voice actor Jenya.

=== Gua Army ===
The Gua Army (グア軍団, Gua Gundan; 12-14) was an evil empire that first appeared from the Andro Melos comics and miniseries. Their original plan was to invade the galaxy until the army went defunct after their leaders were killed by the Andro Warriors. Soon, this army was rebuilt after Juda Spectre's death in Ultra Fight Victory, as Mold and Gina were revived as well and they arrived on Earth in X's world to harvest the mysterious Dark Thunder Energy to strengthen their force. Unfortunately, Ultraman Ginga appeared and revealed that he had wiped the entire Gua Army's armada while on his way to X's world.

==== Leaders ====
- Phantom Composite Figure Great Devil Emperor Gua Spectre (幻影合身大魔帝 グア・スペクター, Gen'ei Gasshin Daimatei Gua Supekutā; 14): The combined form of the leaders of Gua Army, he used Mold's body as a basis while its weapons were Mold Spectre's Bat Axe and Juda Spectre's Bat Calibre (バットキャリバー, Batto Kyaribā), with the latter wielded Juda and Gina's faces. This formation originally tried to release all of Xio's Spark Dolls as Gua Army's new combatants until Ultraman Gingavictory and Ultraman Exceed X killed him. He is voiced by Hidenari Ugaki and Minami Tsukui, both are behind the voices of Mold and Gina respectively.
  - Phantom Space Great King Mold Spectre (幻影宇宙大王 モルド・スペクター, Gen'ei Uchū Daiō Morudo Supekutā; 12-14): The eldest son and the first sibling. Originally the Army Commander Mold (軍団長モルド, Gundan-chō Morudo), he was revived and firstly fought Show/Ultraman Victory in hopes of avenging Juda's defeat but was forced to bring him to X's world as the Gua Army's captive. His main weapon is the Bat Axe (バットアックス, Batto Akkusu) tomahawk. After Ginga wiped the remaining Gua Army's armada, Mold was forced to use Xio's Spark Dolls as place-holders for his army and combined with his siblings until he was killed by Ultraman Gingavictory and Ultraman Exceed X. He was voiced by Hidenari Ugaki (宇垣 秀成, Ugaki Hidenari).
  - Phantom Space Queen Gina Spectre (幻影宇宙女王 ギナ・スペクター, Gen'ei Uchū Joō Gina Supekutā; 12-14): The only daughter and middle sibling. Originally the Army Commander Gina (軍団長ギナ, Gundan-chō Gina), she was revived and took the appearance of a woman garbled in warrior outfit. Her main weapon is a whip called the Bat Whip (バットウィップ, Batto Uippu) and can manipulate dark energies to awaken monsters and turn Spark Dolls back to their original forms. In her final hours, she combined with Mold and Juda to form Gua Spectre. Gina Spectre is portrayed by Minami Tsukui (佃井 皆美, Tsukui Minami).
  - Phantom Space Emperor Juda Spectre (幻影宇宙帝王 ジュダ・スペクター, Gen'ei Uchū Teiō Juda Supekutā; 14): The youngest sibling and the second son. He was originally the first of his siblings to be revived but his plan to invade the galaxy was stopped by the Ultramen, especially Victory Knight in Ultra Fight Victory. But nonetheless, his spirit re-emerges to assist the Gua siblings in forming Gua Spectre.

==== Servants ====
- Saber Tyrant Alien Magma (サーベル暴君 マグマ星人, Sāberu Bōkun Maguma Seijin; 12, 13): An alien mercenary hired by Gina Spectre alongside an Alien Shaplay. His main weapon is a pair of Pata called the Magma Saber (マグマサーベル, Maguma Sāberu) on each hand and can grow into the monstrous size to that of Ultraman. Both him and Shaplay were tasked to take care of Show until he managed to escape. Later, he assists Mold in fighting Ultramen X and Victory but in the end was killed by Victory Knight. The Alien Magma is voiced by Isamu Yūsen (祐仙 勇, Yūsen Isamu). While he first appeared in episodes 1 and 30 of Ultraman Leo, but his position in the Gua Army alluded to the Evil Battle Aliens Alien Magma Triumvirate (悪の戦闘星人 マグマ星人 3人衆, Aku no Sentō Seijin Maguma Seijin San-ninshū) from the Andro Melos miniseries.
- Dark Alien Alien Shaplay (暗黒星人 シャプレー星人, Ankoku Seijin Shapurē Seijin; 12-14): An alien mercenary hired by Gina Spectre alongside an Alien Magma. He was finally killed by Sho, whom originally tried to attack Gina until Shaplay took the bullet for her. The Alien Shaplay is voiced by Haruka Jinya (陣谷 遥, Jin'ya Haruka) and first appeared in episode 20 of Ultraseven.

=== Intergalactic Criminal Networks ===
Aside from regular aliens, there are also intergalactic criminals serving under criminal networks:

- Dark Star Cluster (暗黒星団, Ankoku Seidan; 9): A crime network run by four aliens, they were first spotted attempting robbery at a warehouse. When Halky's Samekujira, Jolly appeared on Earth, they demanded his pet be sold as a monster weapon but Valky challenges them for a rugby match, which they ended up losing. Unable to accept such defeat, the Dark Star Clusters enlarged and ran amok until Ultraman X Gomora Armor neutralize the situation by sending them to outer space via Gomora Oscillation Wave.
  - Dark Alien Alien Babarue (暗黒星人 ババルウ星人, Ankoku Seijin Babaru Seijin; 9): The leading member, Babarue was once a top player number 8 of the Space Rugby league (宇宙ラグビーリーグ, Uchū Ragubī Rīgu) until he retired and formed the criminal group. While playing rugby, his signature move is Bullet Babarue Kick (弾丸ババルウキック, Dangan Babarū Kikku). The Alien Babarue was voiced by Kazunori Naotsuka (直塚 和紀, Naotsuka Kazunori) and first appeared in episode 38 of Ultraman Leo.
  - Transforming Phantom Alien Zetton (変身怪人 ゼットン星人, Henshin Kaijin Zetton Seijin; 9): Appears wearing a special suit which designed after a golden tuxedo. He has the ability to enlarge into gigantic size like his teammates, something which his race actually incapable of. The Alien Zetton was voiced by Yūki Ono (小野 友樹, Ono Yūki) and first appeared in episode 39 of Ultraman.
  - Abduction Phantom Kemur (誘拐怪人 ケムール人, Yūkai Kaijin Kemūru Jin; 9, 16): A fast-moving alien with the ability to elongate his limbs for a greater mobility. Another Kemur was part of a criminal network ran by a Dada, who wants to kidnap female humans. He was captured by Xio and his interrogation by Captain Kamiki leads to the destruction of his boss' criminal syndicate. Kemur was voiced by Kōichi Toshima (外島 孝一, Toshima Kōichi), while his disguise was portrayed by Makoto Takahashi (高橋 麻琴, Takahashi Makoto). First appeared in episode 19 of Ultra Q.
  - Three-faced Phantom Dada (三面怪人 ダダ, Sanmen Kaijin Dada; 9, 16): A clumsy, yet quick-thinking, he has the ability to teleport. Another Dada was a leader of his own criminal network who wanted to kidnap female women until he was captured by Xio. The second Dada revealed that humanity is on the verge of extinction from the effect of Dark Thunder Energy. Dada was voiced by Takahiro Maeda (前田 高宏, Maeda Takahiro) in episode 9 and Daisuke Nagumo (南雲 大輔, Nagumo Daisuke) in episode 16 while first appeared in episode 28 of Ultraman.
- Dada's criminal network: Appeared in episode 16, this group is formed by a Dada, who wanted to collect several female humans for cloning, predicted that humanity will be endangered from the Dark Thunder Energy's assault. This group was finally put to an end by Xio.
  - Planet Phantom Cicada Woman (遊星怪人 セミ女, Yūsei Kaijin Semi Onna; 16): A female cicada-like alien, her duty was to lure female victims to be shrink and captured until she was apprehended by Xio after Asuna disguised as her client. Cicada Woman's disguise was portrayed by Una (宇那) and first appeared in episode 15 of Ultra Q: Dark Fantasy.

=== Zaigorg ===
Inferno Demon Monster Zaigorg (閻魔獣 ザイゴーグ, Enma-jū Zaigōgu; X The Movie) is the main antagonist of Ultraman X The Movie. Long ago, a monster that was sealed in an ancient civilization, it was released to the present day by a greedy treasure hunter Kurosaki, whom lifted the seal of Zaigorg's prison. After escaped, it defeated Ultraman Exceed X and advanced to Carlos Communications to destroy the stone that sealed it before. Xio members tried to use the Cyber Monsters' powers but failed after Zaigorg unleashed its minions, Gorg Antlar and Gorg Fire Golza. Once arriving at the tower, the prison stone, Sparklence and X Devizer reacted with each other, restoring Ultraman X and bringing forth Ultraman Tiga (via Tsukasa) and Ultraman for them to fight against the destroyer. With Gorg Antlar and Fire Golza taken care of, X seemingly defeated Zaigorg but the latter quickly robbed Tiga and Ultraman's energies to summon five Tsurugi Demaagas across the worldwide. After obtaining the Beta Spark Armor, X freed the two Ultra Warriors and easily outmatched Zaigorg before defeating it with Beta Spark Arrow.

Zaigorg's main weapon is a huge kanabō on its right arm and had the ability to unleash blade-like protrusions on its back, which in turn created Inferno Demon Clones as his entire army. It can also create molten lava to burrow underground and unleash tentacles from its chest to grab its opponents and absorb their energies.

=== Inferno Demon Clones ===
The Inferno Demon Clones (閻魔分身獣, Enma Bunshin-jū; X The Movie) is an army of Zaigorg's clones of past monsters, which were created using spikes that emerge from his back before they were launched to create respective monsters. Two monsters, Gorg Antlar and Fire Golza were created as part of Zaigorg's army while advancing to Carlos Communications to destroy the stone that sealed it. Later, by absorbing the energies of Ultraman and Ultraman Tiga, five clones of Tsurugi Demaaga were created and sent simultaneously across the world:

- Gorg Antlar (ゴーグアントラー, Gōgu Antorā): A stag beetle-themed monster and an enhanced version of Antlar, one of Ultraman's past enemies. It was colored red per alteration from Zaigorg and can fly with its wings. Gorg Antlar engaged in a fight against Ultraman Tiga and Xio fighter jets, Sky Musketty and Space Musketty. First engaged against Tiga Sky Type in an aerial combat, its wings were crippled by Sky Musketty via Cyber Birdon's powers and forced to battle Tiga Power Type on land before being destroyed by Multi Type via Zepellion Ray. Gorg Antlar is a tribute to Antlar from episode 7 of Ultraman.
- Gorg Fire Golza (ゴーグファイヤーゴルザ, Gōgu Faiyā Goruza): An enhanced version of Fire Golza, one of Ultraman Tiga's past enemies. It was colored light blue per alteration from Zaigorg and can roll itself into a cannonball for attack. Gorg Fire Golza fought against Ultraman, whom accompanied by Asuna via Xio Bazooka and Wataru in Land Musketty. With Ultraman injured by Golza's cannonball, Asuna and Wataru used the powers of Cyber Gomora and Cyber Zetton respectively to delay Golza while Ultraman recovers and destroyed it with his Specium Ray. Gorg Fire Golza is a tribute to Fire Golza from episode 18 of Ultraman Tiga.
- Tsurugi Demaaga: See below.

== Ozora Family ==
- Takashi Ozora (大空 鷹志, Ōzora Takashi; 1, 2, 12, 22): Daichi's father and an archaeologist that studies the OOPArt Spark Dolls. He disappeared 15 years prior to the start of the series when trying to rescue his wife in a laboratory that was soon digitized during the Ultra Flare, as the young Daichi watch in horror. Before the event, he entrusted Gomora to Daichi as the Spark Doll becomes the very keepsake from Takashi. He was thought to be killed in that incident but in fact survived. After Greeza was killed, Takashi and Haruka approached their son for the final time, congratulating him for his bravery before disappearing. Takashi Ozora was portrayed by Yūrei Yanagi (柳 憂怜, Yanagi Yūrei).
- Haruka Ozora (大空 遥, Ōzora Haruka; 2, 12, 20, 22): Daichi's mother and a space physicist. Haruka was the first to discover the Xlugger prior to the Ultra Flare, along with the prophecy of the Earth's demise by Greeza. However, she also discovered that her son would become Earth's savior in the future and choose to disappear alongside Takashi in a laboratory that was soon digitized during the Ultra Flare, as the young Daichi watch in horror. Haruka's space communicator was kept by Daichi as he tried to follow his mother's wish of communicating with extraterrestrial life forms. She was thought to be killed in that incident but in fact survived and sent her message to Earth, seeking Daichi for help. After Greeza was killed, Haruka and Takashi approached their son for the final time, congratulating him for his bravery before disappearing. Haruka Ozora was portrayed by Shizuka Ochi (越智 静香, Ochi Shizuka).

== Other characters ==
- Yūki Harusaki (春崎 優希, Harusaki Yūki; 6, 7): A schoolgirl whom fell in love with tE-rU regardless of his extraterrestrial origin after he saved her from several thugs. She willingly helps him after he accidentally provoked multiple misunderstandings with the humans. Before leaving for Planet Gold, tE-rU gave Yūki his pendant and wishes that her name would represent the courage that would unite the galaxy. Yūki Harusaki was portrayed by Yūki Shinmasu (新舛 有紀, Shinmasu Yūki).
- Isamu Kazama (風間 イサム, Kazama Isamu; 9): Age 20 years old and Wataru's younger brother, he is the number 10 rugby player of the Seihoku University, as his career was originated from his admiration towards his brother. However, after a humiliating defeat, he quits rugby until an encounter with the Nebula House residents. Isamu's willingness to participate in a rugby match to save their pet Jolly renewed his spirit as Isamu resumes his career, while preparing for a championship in London, England. Isamu Kazama was portrayed by Kyouichi Shioya (汐谷 恭一, Shioya Kyōichi).
- Hana Suda (須田 花, Suda Hana; 10): A young civilian girl and a resident of Sakane Village. She learned of Houlinga's past from her father and befriended the monster, revealing to Daichi what actually happened to Houlinga after Xio mistaken the monster for being ill. Hana Suda was portrayed by Ai Nakamura (中村 愛依, Nakamura Ai).
- Chizuru Ueki (植木 千鶴, Ueki Chizuru; 10): Hana's caretaker in her father's absence. Chizuru Ueki was portrayed by Misato Hirata (平田 弥里, Hirata Misato).
- Yamato Suda (須田 大和, Suda Yamato; 10): Hana's grandfather and the mayor of Sakane Village. He viewed Houlinga as the village's centrepiece in tourism but mistaken the monster for being ill, prompting Xio to take action. Yamato Suda was portrayed by Yu Tokui (徳井 優, Tokui Yū).
- Hiromi Kamiki (神木 裕美, Kamiki Hiromi; 15): Aged 21 and Captain Kamiki's daughter, she was left behind by her father for several years due to his duty as a soldier. However, she never holds a grudge towards him, knowing his job is to save civilians from monster attacks. She invited him to her wedding ceremony, which Shotaro wasn't able to attend after Gomess (S) attacks the city. To make up for his absence, Hiromi and her father re-enact her wedding ceremony. Hiromi Kamiki was portrayed by Kaoru Hirata (平田 薫, Hirata Kaoru), while the young Hiromi was portrayed by Maharu Nemoto (根元 真陽, Nemoto Maharu).
- Yuki Kamiki (神木 雪, Kamiki Yuki; 15): Captain Kamiki's wife and Hiromi's mother, she died at the hospital 11 years prior to the series, leaving Hiromi alone when Captain Kamiki was burdened with his duty as an UNVER personnel at that time. Yuki Kamiki was portrayed by Aki Morita (森田 亜紀, Morita Aki).
- Kaoru Tachibana (橘 かおる, Tachibana Kaoru; 16, 20): Sayuri's eldest daughter. During Bemular's attack in Canada, she was rendered unconscious and almost killed until Nexus/Sayuri rescued her. Kaoru Tachibana was portrayed by Sorami Watanabe (渡邉 空美, Watanabe Sorami).
- Michiru Tachibana (橘 みちる, Tachibana Michiru; 16, 20): Sayuri's youngest daughter. Michiru Tachibana was portrayed by Sora Tamaki (田牧 そら, Tamaki Sora).
- Sakura Aizawa (相沢 サクラ, Aizawa Sakura; 17): A young girl whom recently moved to a place near Tatara city, she befriended Pigmon and kept its existence a secret from her mother, until the monster reveals itself to warn others of the Dark Thunder Energy. Sakura Aizawa was portrayed by Cocone Hamada (濱田 ここね, Hamada Kokone).
- Kaori Aizawa (相沢 かおり, Aizawa Kaori; 17): Sakura's mother. Kaori Aizawa was portrayed by Kumiko Endo (遠藤 久美子, Endō Kumiko).
- Nanako (菜々子; 18): Wataru's childhood friend, she appears to be in relationship with Hayato, causing Wataru to become jealous. Nanako was portrayed by Chihiro Otsuka (大塚 千弘, Ōtsuka Chihiro).
- Shogo Tachibana (橘 祥吾, Tachibana Shōgo; 20): Sayuri's husband, he was the one that moved their family to Canada while she works as a Xio Lieutenant in Japan, fearing for his daughters' safety from monster attacks. His family was almost killed by a Bemular until Ultraman Nexus, whom bonded with Sayuri, rescued them. Shogo Tachibana was portrayed by Takuji Kawakubo (川久保 拓司, Kawakubo Takuji), who previously played Kazuki Komon from Ultraman Nexus.
- Hayato's father (21): Hayato's father, whom runs a successful noodle restaurant. Though not making any appearances, his voice can only be heard when Hayato called him through his Devizer as the latter promises to return home in New Year's Eve. Hayato's father was voiced by Shigeru Chiba (千葉 繁, Chiba Shigeru).
- Carlos Kurosaki (カルロス黒崎, Karurosu Kurosaki; X The Movie): A treasure hunter and an internet celebrity, as well as the president of Carlos Communications (カルロスコミュニケーションズ, Karurosu Komyunikēshonzu). He is known for being adventurous, with his experiences had been recorded in the Carlos Kurosaki's World Mystery Q (カルロス黒崎のワールド・ミステリーQ, Karurosu Kurosaki no Wārudo Misuterī Kyu) but at the same time greedy and prideful of his status. During Xio members' expedition into the old civilization, Carlos impatiently remove Zaigorg's seal, unintentionally freeing the monster from its prison. Carlos Kurosaki was portrayed by Michael Tomioka (マイケル富岡, Maikeru Tomioka).
- Saeko Kirihara (桐原 冴子, Kirihara Saeko; X The Movie): Carlos' faithful secretary, she was portrayed by Yuka Nakayama (中山 由香, Nakayama Yuka).
- Tsukasa Tamaki (玉城 ツカサ, Tamaki Tsukasa; X The Movie): An archaeologist of the Toto University and is capable of deciphering ancient codes and languages. She always felt uneasy due to her eccentric son Yuto always following her to every excavation sites. Tsukasa Tamaki was portrayed by Takami Yoshimoto (吉本 多香美, Yoshimoto Takami), previously portraying Rena Yanase in Ultraman Tiga.
- Yuto Tamaki (玉城 ユウト, Tamaki Yūto; X The Movie): See here.

== Returning characters ==
- Arisa Sugita (杉田 アリサ, Sugita Arisa; 13, 14): A female member of UPG, she was accidentally brought alongside Victory to X's world as they escape from the Gua Army's clutches and seek assistance from Xio to fight the Gua Army's invasion. After the army's destruction, she and her friends return to their world via Ultraman X's Ultimate Zero Armor. Arisa Sugita was reprised by Yukari Taki (滝 裕可里, Taki Yukari).

== Spark Dolls ==
The similar concept reused from the past series Ultraman Ginga and its successor, Ultraman Ginga S, Spark Dolls (スパークドール, Supāku Dōru) are the embodiments of Ultramen and other Ultra Monsters but unlike the aforementioned past series, instead of being Ultramen and monsters that were cursed into these dolls, they are OOPArts on Earth studied by several researchers, among them being Takashi Ozora, Daichi's father. As a result of the Ultra Flare, these Spark Dolls were given life as rampaging monsters in the worldwide which Xio fought till nowadays. Eventually, it is also revealed that Earth is not the only planet with it. As shown, alien planets like planet Gold developed their own Spark Doll, Rudian, which was used by the planet's royal prince, tE-rU. They were also seen as useful monster weapons sought by intergalactic outlaws like Alien Zarab, Alien Nackle Bandello etc.

== Other monsters and aliens ==
As a result of the Ultra Flare, Spark Dolls on Earth that were affected becomes monsters that fought by Xio and Ultraman X. However, there are also extraterrestrial threats as well as other aliens and monsters who shows no sign of hostility towards Earthlings (examples with Dr. Gourman, the Alien Fanton that works in Xio).

=== Good ===
- Ancient Monster Gomora (古代怪獣 ゴモラ, Kodai Kaijū Gomora; 19): The Ozora family's Spark Doll, it was given to Daichi by Takashi before the Ultra Flare incident kills him and his wife. Gomora became Daichi's valuable possession ever since that day and had its consciousness shared to the Cyber Gomora, allowing it to assist Xio in real life. It was brought to materialization for the first time but went astray from the effects of Dark Thunder Energy until Exceed X purified it. Before X can turn it to a Spark Doll, Gomora had done the deed already. First appeared in episode 26 of Ultraman.
  - EX Gomora (EXゴモラ, Ī Ekkusu Gomora; 19, 22): The mutation resulted after the radiation of Dark Thunder Energy, EX Gomora's body was heavily armored and able to launch EX Super Oscillation Wave (EX超振動波, Ī Ekkusu Chō Shindō-ha). It rampages in a pier until Exceed X purified it. EX Gomora first appeared in the 2005 video game Ultraman Fighting Evolution Rebirth under the name Modified Gomora (改造ゴモラ, Kaizō Gomora) but made its TV debut in episode 11 of Ultra Galaxy Mega Monster Battle.
- Exiled Alien Alien Gold "tE-rU" (亡命宇宙人 ゴールド星人 tE・rU(テル), Bōmei Uchūjin Gōrudo Seijin Teru; 6, 7): A survivor from planet Gold, tE-rU was sent by his ancestor to reawaken Rudian on Earth to destroy the monster Gargorgon. After a misunderstood with the Earthlings, he attacked them, believing them as hostile with Rudian until X managed to halt his assaults. tE-rU was put under Xio's custody and learns of Daichi's relation to Ultraman X, seeking their help as they battle Gargorgon. tE-rU was portrayed by Masaya Kikawada (黄川田 将也, Kikawada Masaya).
- Mecha Guardian Beast Rudian (メカ守護獣 ルディアン, Meka Shugojū Rudian; 6, 7): A robot from planet Gold, it was spirited away by tE-rU due to the energy of Planet Gold stored within it, not wanting Gargorgon to exploit it. Soon, it receives assistance from Ultraman X and Earth forces, finally defeating the monster.
- Nebula House residents: A trio of peaceful aliens living in human forms in a rented home Nebula House (星雲荘, Seiun-sō). As they worked in the human society, they need to pay the monthly rent of 15,000 ¥ (124.76 USD as of October 2015), thus needing a new housemate to ease the payment and find it in a form of Isamu, Wataru's younger brother. When the Dark Star Cluster demanded Jolly for a monster weapon, the residents participated in a rugby match and wins. Afterward, the group decided to let Isamu rejoin his rugby team. They are tributes to the dark agents from Ultraman Ginga, down to sharing the same actors.
  - Assassination Alien Alien Nackle "Nakuri" (暗殺宇宙人 ナックル星人 名栗(ナクリ), Ansatsu Uchūjin Nakkuru Seijin Nakuri; 9): The head of the Nebula House resident and an office worker. He encouraged Isamu not to give up after hearing the latter is a former rugby player that has given up his career. Nakuri is portrayed and voiced by Kunji Hirano (平野 勲人, Hirano Kunji), the Alien Nackle race first appeared in episodes 37 and 38 of Return of Ultraman.
  - Different Dimension Alien Alien Icarus "Ikari" (異次元宇宙人 イカルス星人 伊刈(イカリ), Ijigen Uchūjin Ikarusu Seijin Ikari; 9): A convenient store worker, he ends his sentence with "Ika" (イカ; lit. "Squid"). Ikari is portrayed and voiced by Tomokazu Seki (関 智一, Seki Tomokazu), the Alien Icarus first appeared in episode 10 of Ultraseven.
  - Space Fisherman Alien Valky "Haruki" (宇宙海人 バルキー星人 春木(ハルキ), Uchū Kaijin Barukī Seijin Haruki; 9): A craftsman who always puts English words in his sentences. Haruki is portrayed and voiced by Tatsuya Hashimoto (橋本 達也, Hashimoto Tatsuya), the Alien Valky first appeared in episode 53 of Ultraman Taro.
  - Marine Animal Samekujira "Jolly" (海獣サメクジラ（ジョリー）, Kaijū Samekujira (Jorī); 9): A baby Samekujira from the Planet Valky and Haruki's pet. It appears on Earth after missing its master but accidentally attracted the Dark Star Cluster's interest as their monster weapon until the Nebula House residents defeated them in a rugby match. Samekujira first appeared in episode 53 of Ultraman Taro.
- Underground Sacred Beast Shepherdon (地底聖獣 シェパードン, Chitei Seiju Shepādon; 14): Mentioned by Hikaru, this monster was one of the characters of Ultraman Ginga S and the Victorian's protector aside from Ultraman Victory. It is currently held in Spark Doll state after being brutally attacked by Verokron and can be utilized as Shepherdon Saber (シェパードンセイバー, Shepādon Seibā).
- Friendly Monster Pigmon (友好珍獣 ピグモン, Yūkō Chinjū Pigumon; 17): A race of small friendly monster that awakened ever since the Ultra Flare incident and mostly found in Sydney, Australia and Luxembourg. Pigmons are rated as the most friendly monster and can easily felt loneliness when no children or any of their kind were around. One of them lives in Japan, having met various children and played with them, as well as collecting their keepsakes with its recent friend is the newly moved girl Sakura. Witnessing the Dark Thunder Energy, Pigmon tries to warn Sakura and the Tatara City civilians but was mistaken as a threat until Xio members arrive and the Dark Thunder Energy summoned King Guesra. It seemingly died after protecting a civilian from falling rubble until Xio members nursed it back to health and return Pigmon to Sakura. First appeared in episode 8 of Ultraman.
- Space Cat Mu (宇宙化猫 ムー, Uchū Bakeneko Mū; 18): A space cat that X rescued in the past, Mu grew infatuated towards X and flew to Earth to look for it, unintentionally causing troubles and accidentally wiped X and everyone's memories of her until her tears cured the victims at the cost of her own memories and love for X. Mu was voiced by Jenya, whom first voiced Gargorgon in this series while Mu itself is tribute to the Space Cats that appeared in episode 16 of Ultraman Max.

=== Evil ===
- Molten Iron Monster Demaaga (熔鉄怪獣 デマーガ, Yōtetsu Kaijū Demāga; 1, 12): Demaaga was an iron clad demon from eight centuries prior, rampaging on the Pacific lands and sealed by the giant of light. Demaaga reawakened in the modern era and went toward the city until he was stopped by X and regressed into a Spark Doll, which later recovered by Daichi. Another breed was awakened by Gina Spectre as a test subject which she intends to use by charging it with the Dark Thunder Energy and becomes Tsurugi Demaaga until Ultraman Exceed X cleanse the monster from said energy, returning to normal before being regressed into a Spark Doll by Xanadium Ray. Demaaga's common ability is to unleash extreme heats and flames and burrowing underground.
  - Tsurugi Demaaga (ツルギデマーガ, Tsurugi Demāga; 12, 22 X the Movie): Affected by the Dark Thunder Energy, the second breed of Demaaga was mutated into growing blades underneath its arms and shoulders. This monster easily pummels X, forcing it to separate from Daichi and losing himself in the Cyber World. It fought the Xio mechas before X appears again as Ultraman Exceed X, cleansing Tsurugi Demaaga from the energy and reverting it to normal. In Ultraman X The Movie, five clones of Tsurugi Demaaga were created simultaneously by Zaigorg after absorbing the energies of Ultraman and Ultraman Tiga. Each clone was sent to the worldwide on a rampaging spree until five Type U Cyber Cards reacted and summoned the Ultra Warriors. Each Demaagas were faced with the Ultra Warriors and defeated by the Ultras' finishers after they received an additional power boost from Exceed X Beta Spark Armor.
- Underground Monster Telesdon (地底怪獣 テレスドン, Chitei Kaijū Teresudon; 3): Telesdon attacks the Area T-7B under orders of the Underground Woman. He attacks again the next night but defeated by X in Eleking Armor via the Eleking Electric Shock Wave. The Spark Doll was salvaged by the Underground Woman before she left it to Xio after vanishing due to being shot multiple times. Telesdon is capable of spinning its body into a giant drill for attacks, breathing magma and pecks with its sharp beak. First appeared in episode 22 of Ultraman.
- Underground Woman (地底女, Chitei Onna; 3): She hates the human race for "poisoning" the night scenery with lights. She assumes the disguise of Ryoko Mabuse (間伏 涼子, Mabuse Ryōko), a late beauty salon manager. After Telesdon's defeat, she salvaged the monster's Spark Doll but loses it when Xio members attack her as she disappears. Currently, her background still remains a mystery but according to Daichi, while he was investigating in a subway, he found a 500-year-old monument which was erected to seal something unknown. Her main weapon is a blaster gun and can unleash a painful screech enough to disrupt electricity and summon Telesdon. The Underground Woman was portrayed by Hinako Saeki (佐伯 日菜子, Saeki Hinako) and is a tribute to the Underground People that appeared in episode 22 of Ultraman, yet even demonstrated the fact that she lacks a pair of human eyes.
- Evil Alien Alien Zarab (凶悪宇宙人 ザラブ星人, Kyōaku Uchūjin Zarabu Seijin; 4): A terrorist that destroyed countless planets and sets Earth as his target. He brings forth Bemstar from a Spark Doll and allows the monster to wreak havoc while he destroys chemical plants. He managed to escape his first encounter with Xio officers but gets overpowered when fighting them again. Enraged, he tried to grow into giant proportions and crush them but the combined teamwork of Asuna, Hayato and Wataru managed to kill him. His main weapon is a remote bomb controller and can reanimate Sparks Dolls to their true forms. Alien Zarab was voiced by You Murakami (村上 ヨウ, Murakami Yō) and first appeared in episode 18 of Ultraman.
- Great Space Monster Bemstar (宇宙大怪獣 ベムスター, Uchū Dai Kaijū Bemusutā; 4): Originally a Spark Doll, Bemstar was brought to life by an Alien Zarab in his plan to destroy Earth. Bemstar ate Ultraman X via its stomach and took rest on the moon but Xio officers Wataru and Hayato manages to free the Ultra as he finished Bemstar via Xanadium Ray and claimed his Spark Doll. Bemstar's main ability are absorbing incoming attacks, projectiles and even giant-size enemies with its Suction Attractor Spout (吸引アトラクター・スパウト, Kyūin Atorakutā Supauto). First appeared in episode 18 of Return of Ultraman.
- Assassin Alien Alien Nackle "Bandello" (暗殺宇宙人 ナックル星人 バンデロ, Ansatsu Uchūjin Nakkuru Seijin Bandero; 5): An arms dealer and a thief wanted by the Space Garrisons, Bandello arrived on Earth to steal the Spark Dolls from Xio under orders of his client. He managed to steal them but Rui, who accidentally snuck into planet Guillermo to retrieve them back as Bandello was killed by Ultraman Zero. Bandello was voiced by Tetsuo Kishi (岸 哲生, Kishi Tetsuo) and is a homage to the Alien Nackle that appeared in episodes 37 and 38 of Return of Ultraman. According to Koichi Sakamoto, Bandero's client was an Alien Merkind, who appeared in episode 14 in the series.
- Bodyguard Monster Black King (用心棒怪獣 ブラックキング, Yōjinbō Kaijū Burakku Kingu; 5, 14): Bandello's monster, he keeps Xio members busy for moments while his master steals the Spark Doll. His horn was severed by Ultraman Zero, forcing it and Bandello to retreat to planet Gilmo. It was later mentioned as one of the Spark Dolls used by Hikaru in Ultraman Ginga before he assumed Ginga's Spark Doll in battle. Black King is covered with a thick layer of an exoskeleton and can withstand average attacks. First appeared in episode 37 of Return of Ultraman.
  - Black King Drill Custom (ブラックキングドリルカスタム, Burakku Kingu Doriru Kasutamu; 5): Soon, Bandello replaced Black King's lost horn with a drill, which allows it to initiate the Drill Blaster (ドリル・ブラスター, Doriru Burasutā) attack. He was defeated by X's Xanadium Ray after being strike with Gomora Oscillation Wave and Eleking Electric Shock Wave while its Spark Doll was claimed by Rui. Black King Drill Custom is, in fact, a tribute to Modified Black King (改造ブラックキング, Kaizō Burakku Kingu) from Andro Melos comic series.
- High-Speed Alien Alien Sran "Quila" (高速宇宙人 スラン星人 クワイラ, Kōsoku Uchūjin Suran Seijin Kuwaira; 8): Wanting revenge on Ultraman Max for killing one of his kin years ago, Quila posed himself as Dr. Kaito Touma, a Spark Doll examiner from UNVER and tricked Xio into creating Cyber Zetton based on its Spark Doll. With the real Zetton appeared and X wearing Zetton Armor, Quila activated the malware programming and rendered X his puppet until Daichi used Cyber Eleking to destroy the malware from Cyber Zetton. Quila alas was killed by Ultraman Max. An Alien Sran himself, Quila's main ability is to quickly move at incredible speed, launching energy blasts from its claws and enlarges into the size of an Ultraman. Quila was voiced by Kenta Matsumoto (松本 健太, Matsumoto Kenta), while his human form, Kaito Touma was portrayed by Sota Aoyama, whom also played a dual role as Ultraman Max's disguise on Earth. He is a tribute to the aforementioned Alien Sran that appeared in episode 4 of Ultraman Max.
- Space Dinosaur Zetton (宇宙恐竜 ゼットン, Uchū Kyōryū Zetton; 8): The Alien Sran's monster, it was unleashed to attack the city and its Spark Doll was used by Quila in the creation of Cyber Zetton card for the alien to control X with. Eventually, the monster was destroyed by Ultraman X with Xanadium Ray. Zetton is a fearsome monster and capable of launching fireballs, creating enhanced shielding and teleport. While first appeared in episode 39 of Ultraman, according to the Blu-Ray release of the series, this Zetton is the same breed from episode 13 of Ultraman Max due to its barrier being "drill-shaped", namely Zetton Shutter (ゼットンシャッター, Zetton Shattā).
- Space Demon Alien Akumania (宇宙悪霊 アクマニヤ星人, Uchū Akuryō Akumaniya Seijin; 9): (Note: In the Crunchyroll subtitle of episode 33 of Ultraman Leo, his name is spelt as "Alien Demoniya".) The Dark Star Cluster's personal referee, he allowed cheats in the rugby match, hinting that he was bribed by them. First appeared in episode 33 of Ultraman Leo.
- Strategic Alien Alien Pedan (策略星人 ペダン星人, Sakuryaku Seijin Pedan Seijin; 11): Only mentioned in the series, according to Gourman, they are a barbaric race that destroyed civilizations on seven planets. They sent King Joe to attack Earth. First appeared in episode 14 of Ultraseven.
- Space Robot King Joe (宇宙ロボット キングジョー, Uchū Robotto Kingu Jō; 11): The Alien Pedan's robot, it was launched to attack Earth as its target. Its main ability is to split into four spaceships and able to resist minor attacks due to being built from the extraterrestrial metal Pedanium (ペダニウム, Pedaniumu). It was destroyed by Ultraman X's Galaxy Cannon after being weakened by Cyber Gomora's Cyber Super Oscillation Wave. First appeared in episode 14 of Ultraseven.
- Transformation Monster Zaragas (変身怪獣 ザラガス, Henshin Kaijū Zaragasu; 12): Summoned by Gina Spectre from its Spark Doll, Zaragas was used as her replacement to flee from her fight with Asuna while she checked on Tsurugi Demaaga. Zaragas fought Cyber Gomora, who connected to Asuna and defeated from Gomora's Cyber Super Oscillation Wave before being reduced back to a Spark Doll and picked up by Xio. Zaragas' body can adapt to any attacks and unleashes blinding flashes through its body tubes. First appeared in episode 36 of Ultraman.
- Space Merchant Alien Merkind (宇宙商人 マーキンド星人, Uchū Shōnin Mākindo Seijin; 14): An arms dealer hired by the Gua Army, he sold them Mecha Gomora's Spark Doll and Spark Doll detectors but eventually betrayed and shot dead by the Alien Shaplay. The Alien Merkind was voiced by Holly Kaneko (金子 はりい, Kaneko Harii) and first appeared in episode 3 of Ultraseven X. According to Koichi Sakamoto, he was also the Alien Nackle Bandello's customer from episode 5 of the series.
- Mecha Robot Monster Mecha Gomora (メカロボット怪獣 メカゴモラ, Meka Robotto Kaijū Meka Gomora; 14): A mechanical knock-off of the original Gomora, it first appeared a Spark Doll sold to the Gua Army by an Alien Merkind and used by Gina Spectre to lure Xio members away while Mold attacked their base. It was finally defeated by Cyber Gomora linked by Asuna and Arisa via the Ultlaser. First appeared in Ultra Galaxy Legend Gaiden: Ultraman Zero vs. Darklops Zero.
- Insect type Beast Bugbuzun Brood (インセクトタイプビースト バグバズンブルード, Insekuto Taipu Bīsuto Bagubazun Burūdo; 20): A species of the Space Beasts, collective group of monsters in the galaxy that feeds on their victims' fears, several of them infiltrated the Earth, only to be destroyed by Xio officers. However, one escaped and turned giant by the Dark Thunder Energy by the next day, growing a pair of "branches" on its shoulders and gain sharper talons. It was finally defeated by Exceed X and Ultraman Nexus. Being a Space Beast, these monsters are purely hostile to any beings, with ideals for peaceful coexistence are considered futile. First appeared in the extra episode of Ultraman Nexus.
- Space Ninja Alien Baltan (宇宙忍者バルタン星人, Uchu Ninja Barutan Seijin; X The Movie): A crayfish-themed alien and the adversary of the original Ultraman. True to their subtitle, they were notorious for their mastery in illusions. They were only mentioned by Gourman during the movie, fighting against Ultraman before the entire group were eliminated. First appeared in episode 2 of Ultraman.

=== Neutral ===
- Space Monster Bemular (宇宙怪獣 ベムラー, Uchū Kaijū Bemurā; 1, 20): The first monster to be awakened from the Ultra Flare, Bemular awakened and rampaged at a construction site in Japan. Fifteen years later, it appeared and attempted to attack Lt. Sayuri's family at Canada, until her first transformation into Ultraman Nexus halted the monster's attack and defeated it, saving her family's lives. First appeared in episode 1 of Ultraman.
- Blue Foam Monster Aboras (青色発泡怪獣 アボラス, Seishoku Happō Kaijū Aborasu; 1): Awakened at Russia, Aboras fought its nemesis, Banila and ensued chaos on the city. First appeared in episode 19 of Ultraman.
- Red Flame Monster Banila (赤色火焔怪獣 バニラ, Sekishoku Kaen Kaijū Banira; 1): Awakened at Russia, Banila fought its nemesis, Aboras and ensued chaos on the city. First appeared in episode 19 of Ultraman.
- Underground Monster Magular (地底怪獣 マグラー, Chitei Kaijū Magurā; 1): Awakened at France, Magular attacked several tourists at Arc de Triomphe, Paris. First appeared in episode 8 of Ultraman.
- Oil Monster Pestar (油獣 ペスター, Yujū Pesutā; 1): Awakened at Middle East, Pestar attacked several workers at an oil refinery. First appeared in episode 13 of Ultraman.
- Freezing Monster Peguila (冷凍怪獣 ペギラ, Reitō Kaijū Pegira; 1): Awakened at Singapore, Peguila induced snowstorms at Marina Bay Sands. First appeared in episode 5 of Ultra Q.
- Volcanic Bird Monster Birdon (火山怪鳥 バードン, Kazan Kaichō Bādon; 2): Birdon emerges from Okumayama to create a nest for her eggs, unintentionally placing several civilians in captive. She battles Xio members and Ultraman X, later defeated by Ultraman X Gomora Armor's Gomora Oscillation Wave. Her Spark Doll was recovered by Daichi. Birdon's ability is to launch fireballs and rotates its neck to 180 degrees. First appeared in episode 18 of Ultraman Taro.
- Immobile Monster Houlinga (不動怪獣 ホオリンガ, Fudō Kaijū Hōringa; 10): A monster native to Sakane village, its brethren previously became mountains of the village at the end of their life cycles. It tried to join its comrades but was mistaken for being sick and injected with a nutrition drug by Xio, causing it to rampage on the village until Ultraman X purified it from the ailment and finally rests in peace. A peaceful monster, it can unleash its tentacles over the Sakane village and deliver nutrients to the land. Houlinga is based on Hoori, the third and youngest son of the kami Ninigi-no-Mikoto and the blossom princess Konohanasakuya-hime from the Japanese mythology.
- Ancient Monster Gomess (S) (古代怪獣 ゴメス(S), Kodai Kaijū Gomess (Esu); 15): An ancient monster that scientifically labelled as Gometeus (ゴメテウス, Gometeusu), it appeared and had rampaged on two places, first in a countryside and second in the urban area. After taking beatings from Ultraman X in its second rampaging spree, Gomess (S) burrowed underground to recover itself from the sustained injuries until the Dark Thunder Energy takes effect, turning Gomess (S) more violent and brutish, now with the ability to launch energy stream from its mouth. Gomess was finally put to stop by Ultraman X and Cyber Gomora, controlled by Captain Kamiki. Gomess (S) first appeared in episode 1 of Ultra Galaxy Mega Monster Battle: Never Ending Odyssey while its original and diminutive form, Gomess, first appeared in episode 1 of Ultra Q.
- Deep Sea Monster Gubila (深海怪獣 グビラ, Shinkai Kaijū Gubira; 16): A victim of the Dark Thunder Energy, Gubila rampages until X put a stop to it, purifying the giant fish before defeating it with Xanadium Ray. Gubila's main weapon is a nose drill. First appeared in episode 23 of Ultraman.
- Sea Monster King Guesra (海獣 キングゲスラ, Kaijū Kingu Gesura; 17): A fish monster that is a variant of the Guesra species. It was awakened and corrupted after being bathed from the Dark Thunder Energy, rising from the ground of Tatara City. It fought X and manages to overwhelm the latter until Exceed X purified it from the dark energy before turning it into a Spark Doll. King Guesra's attacks are Shocking Venom (ショッキング・ベノム, Shokkingu Benomu) and launching energy scales. First appeared in Superior Ultraman 8 Brothers.
- Skull Monster Red King (どくろ怪獣 レッドキング, Dokuro Kaijū Reddo Kingu; 18): A monster awakened when the Dark Thunder Energy strikes the ground, it attacked the city, fighting against Mu and X until it was charged with the same energy again into EX Red King before being purified by Exceed X. First appeared in episode 8 of Ultraman.
  - EX Red King (EXレッドキング, Ī Ekkusu Reddo Kingu; 18, 22): After being charged with the Dark Thunder Energy, Red King turned black and his fists enlarges. He was quickly purified by Ultraman Exceed X before being turned to Spark Doll. EX Red King's attack is Flame Road (フレイムロード, Fureimu Rōdo), sending a large series of shockwave impacts to the ground. EX Red King first appeared in the 2005 video game Ultraman Fighting Evolution Rebirth under the name Modified Red King (改造レッドキング, Kaizō Reddo Kingu) but made its TV debut in episode 13 of Ultra Galaxy Mega Monster Battle: Never Ending Odyssey.
- Comet Monster Dorako (彗星怪獣 ドラコ, Suisei Kaijū Dorako; 18): A monster from X's past, it bullied Mu until X defeated it, causing Mu to fall in love with X. First appeared in episode 25 of Ultraman.
- Artificial Life Form M1 (人工生命 M1号, Jinkō Seimei Emu Ichi-gō; 19): An artificial life form created by humanity years ago, M1 was jettisoned to space, orbiting the Earth after being deemed a failure. It kidnapped X while he was battling EX Gomora and imprisoned him and Daichi, feeling that humanity cannot coexist with monsters but changes his mind after seeing Asuna's determination to stop EX Gomora. M1 itself is capable of teleporting a person with only one snap of a finger and block the opponent's attacks. M1 was voiced by Shōzō Iizuka (飯塚 昭三, Iizuka Shōzō) and first appeared in episode 10 of Ultra Q.
- Progenitor Bird Monster Terochilus (始祖怪鳥 テロチルス, Shiso Kaichō Terochirusu): A bird monster awakened during the Ultra Flare incident, facing against the Defense Force armies which Kamiki participated in his younger years. Terochilus attacked a power line linked to same hospital that Kamiki's wife was admitted to, causing a power outage that killed her. Terochilus appeared exclusively in Ultraman X Super Complete Works magazine and was from episodes 16 and 17 of Return of Ultraman.
