= Kawakubo =

Kawakubo (written: 川久保) is a Japanese surname. Notable people with the surname include:

- Kiyoshi Kawakubo (川久保 潔, born 1929), Japanese voice actor
- Rei Kawakubo (川久保 玲, born 1942), Japanese fashion designer
- Takuji Kawakubo (川久保 拓司, born 1981), Japanese actor
- Tamaki Kawakubo (川久保 賜紀, born 1979), American classical violinist
