= Yasue Sato =

Japanese actress, model and singer (born 1978)

- 佐藤 康恵
- Born: December 7, 1978 (age 47); Saitama Prefecture, Japan
- Occupations: Actress, model and singer
- Years active: 1992-present
- Agent: ノースプロダクション
- Height: 1.69 m (5 ft 6 1/2 in)
- Children: 2
- Website: ysjewel.me

Yasue Sato (佐藤 康恵, Satō Yasue; born December 7, 1978 in the Saitama Prefecture, Honshū, Japan) is a Japanese actress and model, and formally trained in ballet. She made her acting debut in the movie Bounce Ko Gals (1997), for which she was given a Best New Talent award at the Yokohama Film Festival. She has since appeared in other feature films including I Love Peace (2003), Mimibukuro Ghost Stories (2004) and Welcome, Patient (2005). She has also made numerous stage performances, including Mirandolina (1998) and Wee Thomas (2003). in 2001, made a guest appearance in the movie Hyakujuu Sentai Gaoranger: Fire Mountain Roars. She played as Nagi Saijyo in Ultraman Nexus. Her most recent role was a guest appearance in GARO where she played as the Makai Priestess Jabi for 3 episodes. She returned to show in Garo Special: Byakuya no Maju. She is also a music artist under the Japan Sony label. She provided motion capture for the protagonist of Haunting Ground. She worked under her stage name "さとう やすえ" (the same reading) from 2006 to 2012.
