= Takuji Kawakubo =

Japanese actor and tarento (born 1981)

- 川久保 拓司
- Born: 17 December 1981 (age 43); Ōta, Tokyo, Japan
- Education: Rikkyo University
- Occupations: Actor; tarento
- Years active: 1999–present
- Agent: Stardust Promotion
- Notable work: Saikano; Takamine: America ni Sakura o Sakaseta Otoko
- Style: Television drama; film; advertisements
- Television: Ultraman Nexus; Fūma no Kojirō; Shiawase no Jikan; We Were There
- Height: 1.8 m (5 ft 11 in)
- Website: Official profile

Takuji Kawakubo (川久保 拓司, Kawakubo Takuji, born 17 December 1981, in Ōta, Tokyo, Japan) is a Japanese actor and tarento who has appeared in a number of television series, feature films, and stage productions. He is represented by Stardust Promotion. He graduated from Rikkyo University.

== Filmography ==
=== TV drama ===
Year	Title	Role	Network	Notes	Ref.
2003	Kamen Rider 555	Shingo Ota	TV Asahi	Episodes 33 and 34	
2004	Kochira Hon Ikegami-sho	Tomonori Mukai	TBS	3rd Series Episode 10	
2004	Ultraman Nexus	Kazuki Komon / Ultraman Nexus	CBC		
2006	Yaoh		TBS	Episode 11	
2006	Kurenai no Monshō	Tamahiko Tsuji	THK		
2007	Yumeji		TBS	Episode 3	
2007	Koisuru Nichiyōbi Dai 3 Series	Kenji	BS-TBS	Episode 20	
2007	Kaidan Shin Mimibukuro: Yirei Manshon		BS-TBS		
2007	Fūma no Kojirō	Musashi Asuka	TV Tokyo		
2009	Ghost Friends	Takumi Nagai	NHK		
2009	Hanchō: Jinnan-sho Asaka Han	Yasuyuki Kuwata	TBS	Episode 11	
2009	Host no Nyōbō		Fuji TV		
2009	Otokomae! 2	Takanari Kurata	NHK	Episode 13	
2011	Yūsha Yoshihiko	Bonji	TV Tokyo	Episode 8	
2011	Ultraman Retsuden	Narrator	TV Tokyo	Episode 19	
2012	Shiawase no Jikan	Toshio Shinoda	THK		
2013	Hōkago Groove	Pizaya	TBS	Final Episode	
2013	Tenma-san ga yuku	Kase	TBS	Episode 9	
2014	Aoi Honō	Murakami	TV Tokyo		
2015	Watashitachi ga Propose sa renai no ni wa, 101 no Riyū ga atteda na	Yoichiro / Yuji	LaLa TV	Episode 10	
2015	Ultraman X	Shogo Tachibana	TV Tokyo	Episode 20; cameo	
2018	Showa Genroku Rakugo Shinju	Tsuburaya Mangetsu	NHK G		

=== Stage ===
Year	Title	Role	Ref.
2003	Black Lizard		
2006	Nangoku Pool no Atsui Suna	Riku Takita	
2008	Butai-ban Fūma no Kojirō	Musashi Asuka	
2008	Harold and Maude	Father Finnegan	
2008	Glass Mask	Yu Sakurakoji	
2008	Richard III	Henry VII of England	
2009	Grey Gardens	Joseph P. Kennedy Jr. / Jerry	
2009	Fantasia		
2010	Smart Motorrian Kōza	Shimada	
2010	Kosa Nostra no Okite		
2011	Ese Shinshi	Masaki Sakamoto	
2012	Tenshi no Diary	Dominion	
2013	Annie	Rooster	
2013	Stage × 12 vol. 3		
2012	Piaf	Ruibari	
2012	Kagerō		
2017	Roméo et Juliette	Paris	

=== Films ===
Year	Title	Role	Notes	Ref
2004	Kamikaze Girls			
2004	Devilman			
2006	Saikano	Nakamura		
2011	Takamine: America ni Sakura o Sakaseta Otoko	Sakichi Toyoda		
2013	I'll Give It My All... Tomorrow	Tanaka		
2021	The Land Beyond the Starry Sky			
2023	Single 8	Mr. Maruyama		

=== Internet ===
Year	Title	Role	Website
2005	Makeinu Kekkon Sōdansho	Takashi Hibino	NetCinema.tv
2008	L-Boy		MovieFull

=== Radio ===
Year	Title	Network
2007	Seishun Adventure	NHK FM

=== Anime television ===
Year	Title	Role	Network	Notes
2006	We Were There	Tadashi Takeuchi	Tokyo MX	
2010	Ojarumaru	Hikaru	NHK-E	13th Series Episode 29

=== Video games ===
Year	Title	Role	Ref.
2013	Heroes' vs	Ultraman Nexus	

=== Music videos ===
Title
Sukima Switch "Hello Especially"

=== Other TV programmes ===
Year	Title	Network	Notes	Ref.
2005	Pro Sportsman No.1	TBS		
2008	Omoikkiriī!! TV	NTV	"Umi-mori Yamamori Asa Gohan no Tabi" reporter	
2010	news every.	CTV	"Cap for Smile" Reporter	
2014	Tetsudō Kikō: Nippon burari Tetsudō Tabi	NHK BS Premium	Traveler; Episodes 12, 27, 33, 43, 48, 52, 57, 67, 68	

=== Advertisements ===
Year	Title	Ref.
1999	Coca-Cola Sā Omatsurida	
2003	McDonald's Nae Value, Ippai Asonde	
2003	Lotte Snow Yukijirushi TUrkish-fū Ice Mango Aji	
2004	Bandai Ōgata Bunri Jū Divait Launcher	
2004	Bandai Ultraman Nexus Apparel Campaign	
2009	Ippongi	

=== Magazines ===
Year	Title	Notes
2007	Gainer	Regular model
