= Ultraman: The Next =

- Film poster
- Directed by: Kazuya Konaka
- Written by: Keiichi Hasegawa
- Produced by: Kiyoshi Suzuki
- Starring: Tetsuya Bessho; Kyoko Toyama; Nae Yuuki
- Cinematography: Shinichi Ooka
- Music by: Tak Matsumoto
- Production company: Tsuburaya Productions
- Distributed by: Shochiku
- Release date: December 18, 2004 (Japan)
- Running time: 97 minutes
- Country: Japan
- Language: Japanese
- Budget: $6.3 million

Ultraman: The Next, released in Japan simply as Ultraman (Japanese: ウルトラマン, Hepburn: Urutoraman) is a 2004 Japanese superhero film directed by Kazuya Konaka and produced by Tsuburaya Productions. It is a prequel to the TV series Ultraman Nexus and is part of the "Ultra N Project", a three-phase experiment aimed to reinvent the franchise for an older audience. Ultraman: The Next was released in Japan on December 18, 2004 and had its American premiere at Grauman's Egyptian Theatre in Hollywood on June 25, 2005.

== Plot ==
First Lieutenant Shunichi Maki of the Japan Air Self-Defense Force is a prestigious F-15 Eagle jet pilot. A lifelong fan of flying since he was a child, being a pilot is his ultimate dream. Unfortunately, his duties distance him from his wife, Yoko, who feels neglected, and his son, Tsugumu, who has a possibly terminal congenital blood disease.

Maki decides to quit the Air Force to devote more time to his family and to spend whatever time is left with his son. He takes a part-time job as a commercial tour guide for a group of people who allow him time to take care of his family.

Before quitting, Maki and his flight partner Yamashima are alerted to a strange red light streaking towards Japan, and Maki's plane passes through the red light seemingly without any damage. He suffers no ill effects other than strange images briefly playing out in his mind. He later discovers that the images are telepathic messages from a strange being that exists in the red light.

== Production ==
=== Design ===
Veteran Ultraman designer Hiroshi Maruyama stressed the difficulty of reinventing the Ultraman design, stating, "Ultraman is a very simple design. This, unfortunately, removes some of the simplicity which is a big part of the design’s charm. But it really can’t be helped. If you tried to remove anything from that design what would you have? It would look like Pepsi Man!" Maruyama originally wanted to give Ultraman "transparent skin" with "glowing streams of red energy" but stated that the executives found the idea "a bit too shocking".

== Cast ==
=== Main characters ===
- Shunichi Maki (真木 舜一) / Ultraman the Next (ウルトラマン・ザ・ネクスト): Played by Tetsuya Bessho.
  - Ayumi Hamakawa as a young Shunichi Maki
- Sara Mizuhara (水原 沙羅): Played by Kyoko Toyama (遠山 景織子).
- Takafumi Udou (有働 貴文) / Beast the One (ビースト・ザ・ワン): Played by Kenya Oosumi (大澄 賢也).

=== Supporting ===
- Nae Yuuki as Yoko Maki
- Ryouhei Hirota as Tsugumu Maki
- Toshiya Nagasawa as Tsuyoshi Kurashima
- Eisuke Kakuta as Ippei
- Yumiko Sato as Yuriko
- Ed Yamaguchi as JASDF Operator Base Commander
- Kazuya Shimizu as Yashiro
- Yoichi Okamura as Restaurant Owner
- Mikiko Amuro as Store Wife Yukie
- Mahiro Endo as Miku
- Hijimi Ono as Miku's Mother
- Kazuya Konaka as Miku's Father
- Naoki Ichimura as JGSDF Signalman
- Kengo Komada as an Announcer
- Keizo Yabe as a Special Forces Member
- Hiroaki Nakamura as a Special Forces Member
- Ryo Kinomoto as a Gourmet Reporter
- Daisuke Ryu
- Masao Kusakari as President Manjime

== Theme songs ==
- OP: "Theme from ULTRAMAN" by Tak Matsumoto
- ED: "Never Good-bye" by TMG
