= Ultraman Nexus =

- English sales flyer
- Genre: Tokusatsu; Kaiju; Fantasy; Superhero; Science fiction Horror fiction Kyodai Hero
- Created by: Tsuburaya Productions
- Developed by: Keiichi Hasegawa
- Directed by: Kazuya Konaka
- Starring: Takuji Kawakubo; Yusuke Kirishima; Masato Uchiyama; Yasue Sato; Tamotsu Ishibashi; Kosei Kato; Keito Goto; Nobuhiko Tanaka
- Composer: Kenji Kawai
- Country of origin: Japan
- Original language: Japanese
- No. of episodes: 37 (+1 EX)

Production
- Producers: Takeshi Okazaki; Hiroyasu Shibuya; Tahei Yamanishi
- Running time: 30 minutes (Note: Including opening & ending song, the next episode preview and also an information video.); 45 minutes (epi. 29 (Note: Uncut home video version oly.))
- Production companies: Tsuburaya Productions; Chubu-Nippon Broadcasting

Original release
- Network: JNN (CBC, TBS)
- Release: October 2, 2004 – June 25, 2005

Related
- Ultra Q: Dark Fantasy; Ultraman Max

Ultraman Nexus (ウルトラマンネクサス, Urutoraman Nekusasu) is a Japanese tokusatsu TV show. Produced by Tsuburaya Productions, Chubu-Nippon Broadcasting (CBC), and Dentsu. It is the thirteenth entry (nineteenth overall) in the Ultra Series and the first to be made for an adult audience. The series aired on Tokyo Broadcasting System, including TBS, CBC, MBS, etc. The show ran from October 2, 2004 until June 25, 2005, with a total of 37 broadcast episodes. Subsequent DVD releases from Bandai Visual saw a brand new 45-minute Episode EX and an extended version of Episode 29.

On April 24, 2017, Toku announced that the series would be broadcast in the United States on its channel beginning May 9, 2017 until June 2, 2017.

== History ==
Ultraman Nexus was part of Tsuburaya Productions' Ultra N Project, an experiment in 2004 to re-invent Ultraman for a new generation of fans. Prior to this, however, Tsuburaya had begun a project called Ultra Collaboration 2 at the end of 2003, which involved a brand-new radio adaptation of Ultra Q called The Ultra Q Club. The project was also due to include a new TV series called Ultraman Noa in early 2004, which is presumably what Ultraman Nexus evolved into. Following the success of the new radio show, Tsuburaya forged a brand-new season, Ultra Q: Dark Fantasy on April 6, 2004, a show which attracted top-rung directors such as Shusuke Kaneko (popular with fans for his work on the Gamera series and Godzilla, Mothra and King Ghidorah: Giant Monsters All-Out Attack).

The first stage of the Ultra N Project was entitled Noa: Nostalgia. The project mascot, Ultraman Noa, was a rather radical change design - an all-silver Ultraman with protruding wings on its back. Ultraman Noa was mainly used for live stage shows and merchandising. The second stage of the project was Next: Evolution. This saw the creation of a new theatrical film, ULTRAMAN. The final stage was Nexus: Trinity - the piece that ties the entire project together. Unlike the previous series Ultraman Cosmos, which was strictly aimed at young children, Ultraman Nexus was the first Ultraman TV series specifically aimed at adults. The show abandons the traditional monster-of-the-week stories in order to be replaced with longer character-based story arcs. Tsuburaya Productions had intended the show to be run during prime time, but the CBC network gave the show a 7:30 AM Saturday morning slot once Pretty Guardian Sailor Moon ended its 49-episode run. The TV series received weak ratings which were attributed to the change in style and not being able to have the target demographic tune in, resulting in the series being cut short from around 50 episodes down to 37.

Three months after its initial run, it was re-run in a new time slot. This time the show aired at 2:30 AM on Tuesday mornings and the ratings met the expectations that were set for the Ultra N Project. Following the ULTRAMAN movie, Tsuburaya ran a teaser trailer for Ultraman 2 Requiem. Due to the performance of Ultraman Nexus, the film was canceled, and Tsuburaya moved ahead with a theatrical version of the then-current television series, Ultraman Mebius.

== Story ==
Taking place four years after the events of Ultraman: The Next (2008, the series progresses into 2009 before the finale), Nexus focuses on the viewpoint of Night Raider rookie Kazuki Komon in the fight against Space Beast threats. During their mission, Komon frequently comes in contact with the titular Ultraman and the relationship he established with the latter's hosts.

At the start of the series, Ultraman Nexus bonds with ex-cameraman Jun Himeya, who was traumatized by his inability to save a young girl from his past. Despite Komon's good relationship with Himeya, TLT views him as a threat regardless of Ultraman's constant attempts in rescuing them. The reveal of Komon's girlfriend, Riko Saida as Dark Faust and her immediate sacrifice nearly sent him into despair until Himeya and Nagi managed to bring him to his senses. Sometime later, Night Raider deserter Shinya Mizorogi returned as the host of Dark Mephisto and captured a weakened Nexus in the Land of the Dead, aiming to strengthen himself with the Ultraman's power, but Himeya's renewed courage and the Night Raider's help resurrected the hero back to life. The battle between two giants resulted in a massive explosion that seemingly claimed their lives, but Himeya reassures Komon that the batton of light shall be passed to someone else.

Not long after, the light of Nexus was inherited by Ren Senjyu, a Promethean child with a short life expectancy who escaped from America to spend the remainder of his life in happiness. In the same way as his predecessor Himeya, Ren becomes fast friends with Komon and develops a relationship with Mizuo, a Memory Police who was sent to spy on him. After redeeming himself, a dying Mizorogi exposed the traitor to be a Night Raider member. Ren eventually outlived his original life expectancy due to the Raphael drug's intervention, but the light of Nexus left him for another candidate.

When the light finally chooses Nagi, the perpetrator behind all Space Beast attacks reveals himself and gloats about how the past events were all for the sake of having Nagi inherit Nexus' light and revive himself. By tricking Nagi into transforming, the Unknown absorbed her into Lethe as he resurrected him in the form of Dark Zagi to attack the city. Komon managed to save Nagi from the darkness as his actions allow him to inherit the light. Transforming into Nexus, Komon used up the forms of his predecessors and their memories until encouragement by the public allows him to evolve into Nexus' long-lost form; Ultraman Noa. With his full power, the silver giant expels Zagi to space and puts an end to his doppelganger. A year later, the Space Beast threat has become public knowledge but is put under control with TLT's expended forces.

== Episodes ==
No.	Title	Directed by	Written by	Original release date
1	"Episode.01: Night Raid"; Transliteration: "Yashū -Naito Reido-" (Japanese: 夜襲－ナイトレイド－)	Kazuya Konaka	Keiichi Hasegawa	October 2, 2004
2	"Episode.02: Space Beast"; Transliteration: "Iseijū -Supēsu Bīsuto-" (Japanese: 異生獣－スペースビースト－)	Kazuya Konaka	Keiichi Hasegawa	October 9, 2004
3	"Episode.03: Ultraman"; Transliteration: "Kyojin -Urutoraman-" (Japanese: 巨人－ウルトラマン－)	Miki Nemoto	Keiichi Hasegawa	October 16, 2004
4	"Episode.04: Meta Field"; Transliteration: "Akūkan -Meta Fīrudo-" (Japanese: 亜空間－メタフィールド－)	Miki Nemoto	Keiichi Hasegawa	October 23, 2004
5	"Episode.5: Dunamist"; Transliteration: "Tekinōsha -Dyunamisuto-" (Japanese: 適能者－デュナミスト－)	Tsugumi Kitaura	Kenichi Araki	October 30, 2004
6	"Episode.6: Relic"; Transliteration: "Iseki -Rerikku-" (Japanese: 遺跡－レリック－)	Tsugumi Kitaura	Kenichi Araki	November 6, 2004
7	"Episode.7: Faust"; Transliteration: "Majin -Fausuto-" (Japanese: 魔人－ファウスト－)	Miki Nemoto	Keiichi Hasegawa	November 13, 2004
8	"Episode.8: Memory Police"; Transliteration: "Emu Pī -Memorī Porisu-" (Japanese: M・P－メモリーポリス－)	Miki Nemoto	Keiichi Hasegawa	November 20, 2004
9	"Episode.9: Warning"; Transliteration: "Keikoku -Wāningu-" (Japanese: 警告－ワーニング－)	Yuichi Abe	Masanao Akahoshi	November 27, 2004
10	"Episode.10: Strike Formation"; Transliteration: "Totsunyū -Sutoraiku Fōmēshon-" (Japanese: 突入－ストライク・フォーメーション－)	Yuichi Abe	Masanao Akahoshi	December 4, 2004
11	"Episode.11: Marionette"; Transliteration: "Ningyō -Marionetto-" (Japanese: 人形－マリオネット－)	Kazuya Konaka	Keiichi Hasegawa	December 11, 2004
12	"Episode.12: Lost Soul"; Transliteration: "Betsuri -Rosuto Sōru" (Japanese: 別離－ロスト・ソウル－)	Kazuya Konaka	Keiichi Hasegawa	December 18, 2004
13	"Episode.13: Illustrator"; Transliteration: "Yochisha -Irasutorētā" (Japanese: 予知者－イラストレーター－)	Miki Nemoto	Sadayuki Murai	December 25, 2004
14	"Episode.14: Mephisto"; Transliteration: "Akuma -Mefisuto-" (Japanese: 悪魔－メフィスト－)	Miki Nemoto	Sadayuki Murai	January 8, 2005
15	"Episode.15: Nightmare"; Transliteration: "Akumu -Naitomea-" (Japanese: 悪夢－ナイトメア－)	Tsugumi Kitaura	Kenichi Araki	January 15, 2005
16	"Episode.16: Labyrinth"; Transliteration: "Meiro -Rabirinsu-" (Japanese: 迷路－ラビリンス－)	Tsugumi Kitaura	Kenichi Araki	January 22, 2005
17	"Episode.17: Darkness"; Transliteration: "Yami -Dākunesu-" (Japanese: 闇－ダークネス－)	Takeshi Yagi	Keiichi Hasegawa	January 29, 2005
18	"Episode.18: Apocalypse"; Transliteration: "Mokushiroku -Apokaripusu-" (Japanese: 黙示録－アポカリプス－)	Takeshi Yagi	Keiichi Hasegawa	February 5, 2005
19	"Episode.19: Cross Phase Trap"; Transliteration: "Yōgekisen -Kurosu Fēzu Torappu-" (Japanese: 要撃戦－クロスフェーズトラップ－)	Yuichi Abe	Masanao Akahoshi	February 12, 2005
20	"Episode.20: Chrome Chester δ" Transliteration: "Tsuigeki -Kuromu Chesutā Deruta-" (Japanese: 追撃－クロムチェスターδ－)	Yuichi Abe	Masanao Akahoshi	February 19, 2005
21	"Episode.21: Sacrifice"; Transliteration: "Junan -Sakurifaisu-" (Japanese: 受難－サクリファイス－)	Miki Nemoto	Sadayuki Murai	February 26, 2005
22	"Episode.22: Cure"; Transliteration: "Ansoku -Kyua-" (Japanese: 安息－キュア－)	Miki Nemoto	Sadayuki Murai	March 5, 2005
23	"Episode.23: Satisfaction"; Transliteration: "Shukumei -Satisufakushon-" (Japanese: 宿命－サティスファクション－)	Tsugumi Kitaura	Keiichi Hasegawa	March 12, 2005
24	"Episode.24: Hero"; Transliteration: "Eiyū -Hīrō-" (Japanese: 英雄－ヒーロー－)	Tsugumi Kitaura	Keiichi Hasegawa	March 19, 2005
25	"Episode.25: Prophecy"; Transliteration: "Yochō -Purofeshī-" (Japanese: 予兆－プロフェシー－)	Tsugumi Kitaura	Keiichi Hasegawa	March 26, 2005
26	"Episode.26: The Third"; Transliteration: "Ren -Za Sādo-" (Japanese: 憐－ザ・サード－)	Kazuya Konaka	Ai Ōta	April 2, 2005
27	"Episode.27: Prayer"; Transliteration: "Inori -Pureiyā-" (Japanese: 祈り－プレイヤー－)	Kazuya Konaka	Ai Ōta	April 16, 2005
28	"Episode.28: Reunion"; Transliteration: "Saikai -Riyunion-" (Japanese: 再会－リユニオン－)	Kazuya Konaka	Ai Ōta	April 23, 2005
29	"Episode.29: Calling"; Transliteration: "Yūsei -Kōringu-" (Japanese: 幽声－コーリング)	Miki Nemoto	Sadayuki Murai	April 30, 2005
30	"Episode.30: Watcher"; Transliteration: "Kanshisha -Wotchā-" (Japanese: 監視者－ウォッチャー－)	Takeshi Yagi	Ai Ōta	May 7, 2005
31	"Episode.31: Bird"; Transliteration: "Tori -Bādo-" (Japanese: 鳥―バード－)	Takeshi Yagi	Ai Ōta	May 14, 2005
EX	"Episode.EX: Lost Memories"; Transliteration: "Shiori -Rosuto Memorīzu" (Japanese: 詩織－ロストメモリーズ－)	Tsugumi Kitaura	Masanao Akahoshi	Unaired
32	"Episode.32: Unknown Hand"; Transliteration: "Kage -Announ Hando-" (Japanese: 影－アンノウンハンド－)	Naoki Ohara	Keiichi Hasegawa	May 21, 2005
33	"Episode.33: A.D. 2004"; Transliteration: "Bōkyaku -Ē Dī Nisen Yon-" (Japanese: 忘却－Ａ．Ｄ．２００４－)	Tsugumi Kitaura	Sadayuki Murai	May 28, 2005
34	"Episode.34: A.D. 2009"; Transliteration: "Fūsa -Ē Dī Nisen Kyū-" (Japanese: 封鎖－Ａ．Ｄ．２００９－)	Tsugumi Kitaura	Masanao Akahoshi	June 4, 2005
35	"Episode.35: Revolt"; Transliteration: "Hanran -Riboruto-" (Japanese: 反乱－リボルト－)	Yuichi Abe	Ai Ōta	June 11, 2005
36	"Episode.36: Farewell"; Transliteration: "Kessen -Feaweru-" (Japanese: 決戦－フェアウェル－)	Yuichi Abe	Ai Ōta	June 18, 2005
37	"Episode.Final: Nexus"; Transliteration: "Kizuna -Nekusasu-" (Japanese: 絆－ネクサス－)	Yuichi Abe	Keiichi Hasegawa	June 25, 2005

== Cast ==
- Kazuki Komon (孤門 一輝, Komon Kazuki): Takuji Kawakubo (川久保 拓司, Kawakubo Takuji)
- Jun Himeya (姫矢 准, Himeya Jun): Yusuke Kirishima (桐島 優介, Kirishima Yusuke)
- Ren Senjyu (千樹 憐, Senju Ren): Masato Uchiyama (内山眞人, Uchiyama Masato)
- Nagi Saijyo (西条 凪, Saijō Nagi): Yasue Sato (佐藤 康恵, Sato Yasue)
- Eisuke Wakura (和倉 英輔, Wakura Eisuke): Tamotsu Ishibashi (石橋 保, Ishibashi Tamotsu)
- Shiori Hiraki (平木 詩織, Hiraki Shiori): Keiko Gotō (五藤 圭子, Gotō Keiko)
- Mitsuhiko Ishibori (石堀 光彦, Ishibori Mitsuhiko)/Hajime Yamaoka (山岡 一, Yamaoka Hajime; 37)/Dark Zagi (ダークザギ, Dāku Zagi; Voice; 34, 37): Kosei Kato (加藤 厚成, Katō Kōsei)
- Yu Kirasawa (吉良沢 優, Kirasawa Yū): Nobuhiko Tanaka (田中 伸彦, Tanaka Nobuhiko)
- Yōichirō Matsunaga (松永 要一郎, Matsunaga Yōichirō): Masami Horiuchi (堀内 正美, Horiuchi Masami)
- Tōgō (東郷): Kenji Sahara (佐原 健二, Sahara Kenji)
- Riko Saida (斉田 リコ, Saida Riko; 1-13, 37): Shion Nakamaru (中丸 シオン, Nakamaru Shion)
- Shinya Mizorogi (溝呂木 眞也, Mizorogi Shin'ya; 11-24, 29, 32)/Dark Mephisto (ダークメフィスト, Dāku Mefisuto): Mitsutoshi Shundō (俊藤 光利, Shundō Mitsutoshi)
- Saya Shutō (首藤 沙耶, Shutō Saya): Hitomi Hidaka (日高 ひとみ, Hidaka Hitomi)
- Hiroyuki Misawa (三沢 広之, Misawa Hiroyuki; 11, 13, 16, 29DC & 32)/Dark Mephisto (Zwei) (ダークメフィスト（ツヴァイ）, Dāku Mefisuto (Tsuvai)): Yoshito Takeuchi (竹内 義人, Takeuchi Yoshito)
- Mizuo Nonomiya (野々宮 瑞生, Nonomiya Mizuo; 25-36): Tomomi Miyashita (宮下 ともみ, Miyashita Tomomi)
- Sera (セラ; 5, 24): Mai Tanaka (田中 舞, Tanaka Mai)
- Jinzou Negoro (根来 甚蔵, Negoro Jinzō): Hiroshi Ōkōchi (大河内 浩, Ōkōchi Hiroshi)
- Megumi Sakuta (佐久田 恵, Sakuta Megumi): Tomoko Kawashima (川嶋 朋子, Kawashima Tomoko)
- Naoichi Harisu (針巣 直市, Harisu Naoichi): Eiichi Kikuchi (きくち 英一, Kikuchi Eiichi)
- Takashi Ojiro (尾白 高志, Ojiro Takashi): Kei Suzuki (鈴木 圭, Suzuki Kei)
- Hayato Kaimoto (海本 隼人, Kaimoto Hayato): Hisataka Kitaoka (北岡 久貴, Kitaoka Hisataka)

=== Voice cast ===
- Ultraman Nexus: Yasunori Masutani (増谷 康紀, Masutani Yasunori)
- Dark Faust (ダークファウスト, Dāku Fausuto): Tetsu Inada (稲田 徹, Inada Tetsu)
- White Sweepers (ホワイトスイーパー, Howaito Suīpā): Kōichi Imamura (今村 公一, Imamura Kōichi), Keizō Kawakura (川倉 けいぞう, Kawakura Keizō), Eiji Yokota (横田 エイジ, Yokota Eiji)

=== Guest cast ===
- Horokusa (保呂草; 19–20): Yasufumi Hayashi (林 泰文, Hayashi Yasufumi)
- Nanaka (七夏; 19–20): Rei Yoshii (吉井 怜, Yoshii Rei)
- Taichirō Yamada (山田 太一郎, Yamada Taichirō; 21–23): Satoru Saitō (斉藤 暁, Saitō Satoru)
- Sara Mizuhara (水原 沙羅, Mizuhara Sara; 33–34): Kyōko Tōyama (遠山 景織子, Tōyama Kyōko)
- Shigeki Takatsuki (高槻 茂樹, Takatsuki Shigeki; EX): Shigeki Kagemaru (影丸 茂樹, Kagemaru Shigeki)

== Songs ==
Opening themes

- "Eiyū" (英雄; "Hero")
  - Lyrics, Composition, & Arrangement: Akihito Tokunaga (徳永 暁人, Tokunaga Akihito)
  - Artist: doa
  - Episodes: 1-25
  - This song is used as the ending theme of episode 37.
- "Aoi Kajitsu" (青い果実; "Unripe Fruit"/"Blue Fruit")
  - Lyrics: Daiki Yoshimoto
  - Composition & Arrangement: Akihito Tokunaga
  - Artist: doa
  - Episodes: 26-37
  - The opening uses the second verse of the full song.

Ending themes

- "Itsumo Kokoro ni Taiyō o" (いつも心に太陽を; "A Sun is Always in My Heart")
  - Lyrics & Composition: U-ka Saegusa
  - Arrangement: Masazumi Ozawa (小澤 正澄, Ozawa Masazumi)
  - Artist: U-ka Saegusa in dB
  - Episodes: 1-13
- "Tobitatenai Watashi ni Anata ga Tsubasa o Kureta" (飛び立てない私にあなたが翼をくれた; "You Gave Me Wings When I Couldn't Fly")
  - Lyrics: U-ka Saegusa
  - Composition: Aika Ohno (大野 愛果, Ōno Aika)
  - Arrangement: Masazumi Ozawa
  - Artist: U-ka Saegusa in dB
  - Episodes: 14-25
- "Akaku Atsui Kodō" (赤く熱い鼓動; "Red Burning Pulse")
  - Lyrics & Artist: Rina Aiuchi
  - Composition: Masaaki Watanuki (綿貫 正顕, Watanuki Masaaki)
  - Arrangement: Masazumi Ozawa
  - Episodes: 26-36

Image songs

- "Fight the Future ~ Ultraman Nexus Theme ~"
  - Lyrics: Goro Matsui
  - Composition: Kawai Kenji
  - Arrangement: Yushima Kuwashima
  - Artist: Project DMM
- "NOA: Kiseki o Sono Te Ni (NOA奇跡をその手に, lit. NOA: A Miracle in Those Hands)"
  - Lyrics & composition: Yuki Hitomi
  - Arrangement: Daimon Kazuya
  - Artist: Project DMM

== Video game ==
A video game based on the series was produced by Bandai for the PlayStation 2, under the name Ultraman Nexus.

== Home media ==
In July 2020, Shout! Factory announced to have struck a multi-year deal with Alliance Entertainment and Mill Creek, with the blessings of Tsuburaya and Indigo, that granted them the exclusive SVOD and AVOD digital rights to the Ultra series and films (1,100 TV episodes and 20 films) acquired by Mill Creek the previous year. Ultraman Nexus, amongst other titles, will stream in the United States and Canada through Shout! Factory TV and Tokushoutsu.
