= Ultraman Retsuden =

- Poster
- Also known as: New Ultraman Retsuden
- Starring: Mamoru Miyano
- Narrated by: Yūji Machi; Takuji Kawakubo
- Composers: Toshihiko Sahashi; Toru Fuyuki
- Country of origin: Japan
- No. of episodes: 259

Production
- Running time: 30 mins
- Production company: Tsuburaya Productions

Original release
- Network: TXN (TV Tokyo)
- Release: July 6, 2011 – June 25, 2016

Related
- Ultraman Zero: The Chronicle

Ultraman Retsuden (ウルトラマン列伝, Urutoraman Retsuden) (Note: "Retsuden" (列伝) is the Japanese word for "history".) is a biography series produced by Tsuburaya Productions created to commemorate the 45th anniversary of the Ultra Series. The show first premiered on TV Tokyo on July 6, 2011 and was in syndication for two years. The show features clips from past Ultra Series shows. The catchphrases for the series are "Let's Schwatch together in front of the television at 6 o'clock on Wednesday!" (水6はテレビの前でみんなでシュワッチ!, Sui roku wa terebi no mae de min'na de Shuwatchi!) and "Kindness and courage to you!" (やさしさと勇気を、君へ!, Yasashisa to yūki o, kimi e!).

The new season of the show is titled New Ultraman Retsuden (新ウルトラマン列伝, Shin Urutoraman Retsuden) and premiered on July 3, 2013. Starting from April 2, 2016, New Ultraman Retsuden changed its broadcasting schedule from 6:00 pm in the Tuesday to 9:00 am in Saturday. Said change is also a part of the 50th anniversary celebration of the Ultra Series. The series was put to an end in late June 2016 except for its final nine episodes (147-155), and it previewed the then-upcoming 2016 Ultra Series, Ultraman Orb.

== Characters ==
- Ultraman Zero (ウルトラマンゼロ, Urutoraman Zero): The main navigator of Ultraman Retsuden.

=== Featured heroes ===
- Ultraman (ウルトラマン, Urutoraman)
- Ultraman Tiga (ウルトラマンティガ, Urutoraman Tiga)
- Ultraman Cosmos (ウルトラマンコスモス, Urutoraman Kosumosu)
- Ultraman Max (ウルトラマンマックス, Urutoraman Makkusu)
- Ultraman Dyna (ウルトラマンダイナ, Urutoraman Daina)
- Ultraman Nexus (ウルトラマンネクサス, Urutoraman Nekusasu)
- Ultraman Ginga (ウルトラマンギンガ, Urutoraman Ginga)
- Ultraman Victory (ウルトラマンビクトリー, Urutoraman Bikutorī)
- Ultraman Gingavictory (ウルトラマンギンガビクトリー, Urutoraman Gingabikutorī)
- Ultraman X (ウルトラマンエックス, Urutoraman Ekkusu)

=== Other heroes ===
- Ultraman King (ウルトラマンキング, Urutoraman Kingu)
- Father of Ultra (ウルトラの父, Urutora no Chichi)
- Mother of Ultra (ウルトラの母, Urutora no Haha)
- Zoffy (ゾフィー, Zofī)
- Ultraseven (ウルトラセブン, Urutorasebun)
- Ultraman Jack (ウルトラマンジャック, Urutoraman Jakku)
- Ultraman Ace (ウルトラマンエース, Urutoraman Ēsu)
- Ultraman Taro (ウルトラマンタロウ, Urutoraman Tarō)
- Ultraman Leo (ウルトラマンレオ, Urutoraman Reo)
- Astra (アストラ, Asutora)
- Ultraman 80 (ウルトラマン80, Urutoraman Eiti)
- Yullian (ユリアン, Yurian)
- Ultraman Great (ウルトラマングレート, Urutoraman Gurēto)
- Ultraman Powered (ウルトラマンパワード, Urutoraman Pawādo)
- Ultraman Scott (ウルトラマンスコット, Urutoraman Sukotto)
- Ultraman Chuck (ウルトラマンチャック, Urutoraman Chakku)
- Ultrawoman Beth (ウルトラウーマンベス, Urutoraūman Besu)
- Ultraman Gaia (ウルトラマンガイア, Urutoraman Gaia)
- Ultraman Agul (ウルトラマンアグル, Urutoraman Aguru)
- Reimon (レイモン)
- Ultraman Mebius (ウルトラマンメビウス, Urutoraman Mebiusu)
- Ultraman Hikari (ウルトラマンヒカリ, Urutoraman Hikari)
- Glenfire (グレンファイヤー, Gurenfaiyā)
- Mirror Knight (ミラーナイト, Mirā Naito)
- Jean-Bot (ジャンボット, Jan Botto)
- Ultraman Noa (ウルトラマンノア, Urutoraman Noa)
- Mountain Gulliver 5 (マウンテンガリバー5号, Maunten Garibā Go-gō)
- Jean-Nine (ジャンナイン, Jan Nain)
- Ultraman Saga (ウルトラマンサーガ, Urutoraman Sāga)
- Ultraman Xenon (ウルトラマンゼノン, Urutoraman Zenon)
- Ultraman Neos (ウルトラマンネオス, Urutoraman Neosu)
- Ultraseven 21 (ウルトラセブン21, Urutora Sebun Tsū Wan)
- Ultraman Boy (ウルトラマンボーイ, Urutoraman Bōi)

== Episodes ==
1. Great Gathering! These Are the Ultra Heroes!! (大集合! これがウルトラヒーローだ!!, Daishūgō! Kore ga Urutora Hīrō da!!)
2. Chase Alien Baltan! The Great Clash in the Air!! (追撃バルタン星人! 空中大激突!!, Tsuigeki Barutan Seijin! Kūchū Daigekitotsu!!)
3. Tiga's Revival! The Super-Ancient Warrior of Light!! (復活のティガ! 超古代の光の戦士!!, Fukkatsu no Tiga! Chōkodai no Hikari no Senshi!!)
4. Bonds Again! Musashi and Cosmos!! (絆はふたたび! ムサシとコスモス!!, Kizuna wa Futatabi! Musashi to Kosumosu!!)
5. Great Decisive Battle! The Ultra Brothers vs. the Mega Monster Army!! (大決戦! ウルトラ兄弟VS大怪獣軍団!!, Daikessen! Urutora Kyōdai Bui Esu Daikaijū Gundan!!)
6. The Stalking Shadow of the Devil! Kyrieloid Appears!! (忍び寄る悪魔の影! キリエロイド出現!!, Shinobiyoru Akuma no Kage! Kirieroido Shutsugen!!)
7. Gigi Who Came from Another Dimension! Break the Micro Trap!! (異次元から来たギギ! ミクロの罠をやぶれ!!, Ijigen kara Kita Gigi! Mikuro no Wana o Yabure!!)
8. Ultraman Zero vs. Darclops Zero Part 1: The Multidimensional Threat (ウルトラマンゼロVSダークロプスゼロ パート① 多次元の脅威!, Urutoraman Zero Tai Dākuropusu Zero Pāto Wan Tajigen no Kyōi!)
9. Ultraman Zero vs. Darclops Zero Part 2: The Darkness Demon Bullet! (ウルトラマンゼロVSダークロプスゼロ パート② 暗黒の魔弾!, Urutoraman Zero Tai Dākuropusu Zero Pāto Tsū Ankoku no Madan!)
10. Ultraman Zero vs. Darclops Zero Part 3: Big Bang Flare! (ウルトラマンゼロVSダークロプスゼロ パート③ 炎のビッグバン!, Urutoraman Zero Tai Dākuropusu Zero Pāto Surī Honō no Biggu Ban!)
11. Clash! Tiga vs. Evil Tiga!! (激突! ティガVSイーヴィルティガ!!, Gekitotsu! Tiga Tai Īviru Tiga!!)
12. Save Dad! Chaos Headder Invasion!! (お父さんを救え! カオスヘッダー大襲来!!, Otōsan o Sukue! Kaosu Heddā Daishūrai!!)
13. A Warrior of Light! Secrets of Ultraman Tiga!! (光の戦士! ウルトラマンティガのひみつ!!, Hikari no Senshi! Urutoraman Tiga no Himitsu!!)
14. Kyrieloid Strikes Back! Tiga in a Desperate Situation!! (大逆襲キリエロイド! ティガ絶体絶命!!, Daigyakushū Kirieroido! Tiga Zettaizetsumei!!)
15. Birth of Ultraman Max! Defeat the 2 Monsters!! (ウルトラマンマックス誕生! たおせ2大怪獣!!, Urutoraman Makkusu Tanjō! Taose Nidai Kaijū!!)
16. The Ruler of Darkness! Gatanozoa Appears!! (暗黒の支配者! ガタノゾーア出現!!, Ankoku no Shihaisha! Gatanozōa Shutsugen!!)
17. Light, Assemble! Ultraman Tiga's Time of Victory!! (光よ集え! ウルトラマンティガ勝利の時!!, Hikari yo Tsudoe! Urutoraman Tiga Shōri no Toki!!)
18. A New Light That Protects the Earth! Ultraman Dyna!! (地球を守る新たな光! ウルトラマンダイナ!!, Chikyū o Mamoru Aratana Hikari! Urutoraman Daina!!)
19. Inherited Bonds of the Soul! Ultraman Nexus!! (受け継がれる魂の絆! ウルトラマンネクサス!!, Uketsugareru Tamashii no Kizuna! Urutoraman Nekusasu!!)
20. Dispatch the Giant Robot! Mountain Gulliver 5!! (巨大ロボ発進せよ! マウンテンガリバー5号!!, Kyodai Robo Hasshin seyo! Maunten Garibā Gogō!!)
21. Ultraman Zero: The Revenge of Belial: Chapter of Bonds (ウルトラマンゼロ THE MOVIE 超決戦!ベリアル銀河帝国 絆の章, Urutoraman Zero Za Mūbī: Chōkessen! Beriaru Ginga Teikoku Kizuna no Shō)
22. Ultraman Zero: The Revenge of Belial: Chapter of Fire (ウルトラマンゼロ THE MOVIE 超決戦!ベリアル銀河帝国 炎の章, Urutoraman Zero Za Mūbī: Chōkessen! Beriaru Ginga Teikoku Honō no Shō)
23. Ultraman Zero: The Revenge of Belial: Chapter of Mirror (ウルトラマンゼロ THE MOVIE 超決戦!ベリアル銀河帝国 鏡の章, Urutoraman Zero Za Mūbī: Chōkessen! Beriaru Ginga Teikoku Kagami no Shō)
24. Ultraman Zero: The Revenge of Belial: Chapter of Steel (ウルトラマンゼロ THE MOVIE 超決戦!ベリアル銀河帝国 鋼の章, Urutoraman Zero Za Mūbī: Chōkessen! Beriaru Ginga Teikoku Hagane no Shō)
25. Ultraman Zero: The Revenge of Belial: Chapter of Light (ウルトラマンゼロ THE MOVIE 超決戦!ベリアル銀河帝国 光の章, Urutoraman Zero Za Mūbī: Chōkessen! Beriaru Ginga Teikoku Hikari no Shō)
26. Osaka Great Decisive Battle! Defeat Neo Giomos!! (大阪大決戦! ネオジオモスを倒せ!!, Ōsaka Daikessen! Neo Jiomosu o Taose!!)
27. The Secret of the Lake! Seven vs. Eleking!! (湖のひみつ! セブン対エレキング!!, Mizuumi no Himitsu! Sebun Tai Erekingu!!)
28. A Brave Rises! Ultraman Gaia!! (勇者立つ! ウルトラマンガイア!!, Yūsha Tatsu! Urutoraman Gaia!!)
29. The Perfect Lifeform! If vs. Max!! (完全生命体! イフ対マックス!!, Kanzen Seimeitai! Ifu Tai Makkusu!!)
30. All Monsters Attack! Birth of Jack!! (怪獣総進撃! ジャック誕生!!, Kaijū Sōshingeki! Jakku Tanjō!!)
31. The Blue Giant! Agul Appears!! (青き巨人! アグル登場!!, Aoki Kyojin! Aguru Tōjō!!)
32. Gubira Appears! Save the Submarine Base!! (グビラ出現! 海底基地を救え!!, Gubira Shutsugen! Kaitei Kichi o Sukue!!)
33. Chaos Darkness! Decisive Battle on the Moon!! (カオスダークネス! 月面の決戦!!, Kaosu Dākunesu! Getsumen no Kessen!!)
34. A True Hero! His Name Is Musashi!! (真の勇者! その名はムサシ!!, Shin no Yūsha! Sono Na wa Musashi!!)
35. Strongest of the Ultra Monsters! Its Name Is Zetton!! (最強のウルトラ怪獣! その名はゼットン!!, Saikyō no Urutora Kaijū! Sono Na wa Zetton!!)
36. A New Shadow! Zelganoid Appears!! (新たなる影! ゼルガノイド出現!!, Aratanaru Kage! Zeruganoido Shutsugen!!)
37. Threat of Sphere! Disappearance of the Solar System!! (スフィアの脅威! 太陽系消滅!!, Sufia no Kyōi! Taiyō-kei Shōmestu!!)
38. Ultraman Dyna! Towards Tomorrow!! (ウルトラマンダイナ! 明日へ!!, Urutoraman Daina! Ashita e!!)
39. Super Decisive Battle! Ultra Heroes!! (超決戦! ウルトラヒーロー!!, Chōkessen! Urutora Hīrō!!)
40. Unite Powers! Ultra Warriors!! (力を合わせろ! ウルトラ戦士!!, Chikara o Awasero! Urutora Senshi!!)
41. Our Wings! Gun Phoenix!! (俺達の翼! ガンフェニックス!!, Ore-tachi no Tsubasa! Gan Fenikkusu!!)
42. Planet of Illusion! Dyna vs. the Destructive Beast!! (幻の遊星! ダイナ対破壊獣!!, Maboroshi no Yūsei! Daina Tai Hakaijū!!)
43. Bonds of Brothers! Ace and Zoffy!! (兄弟の絆! エースとゾフィー!!, Kyōdai no Kizuna! Ēsu to Zofī!!)
44. Max Speed! Infinite Invaders!! (マックススピード! 無限の侵略者!!, Makkusu Supīdo! Mugen no Shinryakusha!!)
45. Challenge from Anti-Space! Gaia vs. Agul!? (反宇宙からの挑戦! ガイア対アグル!?, Han'uchū kara no Chōsen! Gaia Tai Aguru!?)
46. Decisive Battle! Mebius vs. Bogal!! (決戦! メビウス対ボガール!!, Chōkessen! Mebiusu Tai Bogāru!!)
47. Fight Tiga! Super Power Monster Goldras!! (戦えティガ! 超力怪獣ゴルドラス!!, Tatakae Tiga! Chōriki Kaijū Gorudorasu!!)
48. Decisive Battle! Leo Brothers vs. Monster Brothers!! (決戦! レオ兄弟対怪獣兄弟!!, Chōkessen! Reo Kyōdai Tai Kaijū Kyōdai!!)
49. Fierce Battle! Dyna in the Monster Island!! (激闘! 怪獣島のダイナ!!, Gekitō! Kaijūjima no Daina!!)
50. Resurrection of Metron! The Untargeted City!! (復活のメトロン! 狙われない街!!, Fukkatsu no Metoron! Nerawarenai Machi!!)
51. Pride of GUYS! Tsurugi's Determination!! (GUYSの誇り! ツルギの決意!!, Gaizu no Hokori! Tsurugi no Ketsui!!)
52. Miracle of Mother! Ultraman Hikari!! (母の奇跡! ウルトラマンヒカリ!!, Haha no Kiseki! Urutoraman Hikari!!)
53. Save, Max! The Legendary Dragon!! (救えマックス! 伝説の龍!!, Sukue Makkusu! Densetsu no Ryū!!)
54. Demons Rise Again! Aboras vs. Banila!! (悪魔はふたたび! アボラス対バニラ!!, Akuma wa Futatabi! Aborasu Tai Banira!!)
55. The Fort of Phoenix! Gun Booster, Launch!! (不死鳥の砦! ガンブースター発進!!, Fushichō no Toride! Gan Būsutā Hasshin!!)
56. Defeat King Joe! Westward, Ultra Garrison!! (倒せキングジョー! ウルトラ警備隊西へ!!, Taose Kingu Jō! Urutora Keibitai Nishi e!!)
57. Mega Monster Battle: Ultra Galaxy Chapter 1: The Rebellion of Belial (大怪獣バトル ウルトラ銀河伝説 -第1章-「反逆のベリアル」, Daikaijū Batoru Urutora Ginga Densetsu -Dai Isshō- "Hangyaku no Beriaru")
58. Mega Monster Battle: Ultra Galaxy Chapter 2: Rei and Mebius (大怪獣バトル ウルトラ銀河伝説 -第2章-「レイとメビウス」, Daikaijū Batoru Urutora Ginga Densetsu -Dai Nishō- "Rei to Mebiusu")
59. Mega Monster Battle: Ultra Galaxy Chapter 3: Decisive Battle in the Monster Graveyard (大怪獣バトル ウルトラ銀河伝説 -第3章-「怪獣墓場の決戦」, Daikaijū Batoru Urutora Ginga Densetsu -Dai Sanshō- "Kaijū Hakaba no Kessen")
60. Mega Monster Battle: Ultra Galaxy Chapter 4: Ultraman Zero Has Arrived (大怪獣バトル ウルトラ銀河伝説 -第4章-「ウルトラマンゼロ参上」, Daikaijū Batoru Urutora Ginga Densetsu -Dai Yonshō- "Urutoraman Zero Sanjō")
61. Mega Monster Battle: Ultra Galaxy Final Chapter: Revive the Light of the Galaxy (大怪獣バトル ウルトラ銀河伝説 -最終章-「よみがえれ 銀河の光」, Daikaijū Batoru Urutora Ginga Densetsu - Saishū-shō - "Yomigaere Ginga no Hikari")
62. Killer the Beatstar Part 1: Legion of Steel (キラー ザ ビートスター パート①「鋼鉄の軍団」, Kirā Za Bītosutā Pāto Wan "Kōtetsu no Gundan")
63. Killer the Beatstar Part 2: Dictator of Steel (キラー ザ ビートスター パート②「鋼の独裁者」, Kirā Za Bītosutā Pāto Tsū "Hagane no Dokusaisha")
64. Killer the Beatstar Part 3: Tears of Steel (キラー ザ ビートスター パート③「鋼鉄の涙」, Kirā Za Bītosutā Pāto Surī "Kōtetsu no Namida")
65. Let Us Duel!! Hikari vs. the Sword Master from Space Zamsher!! (いざ勝負! ヒカリ対宇宙の剣豪ザムシャー!!, Iza Shōbu! Hikari Tai Uchū no Kengō Zamushā!!)
66. Shining Bond! Nexus, Max, Mebius!! (輝く絆! ネクサス、マックス、メビウス!!, Kagayaku Kizuna! Nekusasu, Makkusu, Mebiusu!!)
67. The Girl Who Came from the Stars! Cosmos vs. the Giant Robot!! (星から来た少女! コスモス対巨大ロボ!!, Hoshi kara Kita Shōjo! Kosumosu Tai Kyodai Robo!!)
68. Baltan Strike Back! Science Patrol Search Party into Space!! (逆襲のバルタン! 科特隊宇宙へ!!, Gyakushū no Barutan! Katokutai Uchū e!!)
69. Rebirth of Yapool! Mebius in Danger!! (復活のヤプール! メビウス危うし!!, Fukkatsu no Yapūru! Mebiusu Ayaushi!!)
70. Flying to Tomorrow! Mebius vs. Verokron!! (明日への飛翔! メビウス対ベロクロン!!, Asu e no Hishō! Mebiusu Tai Berokuron!!)
71. Jack in Big Pinch! Revenge of Alien Baltan Jr.!! (ジャック大ピンチ! バルタン星人Jrの復讐!!, Jakku Dai Pinchi! Barutan Seijin Junia no Fukushū!!)
72. Eleking Attack! The Stolen Max Spark!! (エレキング来襲! 奪われたマックススパーク!!, Erekingu Raishū! Ubawareta Makkusu Supāku!!)
73. Ultraman 80 Appears! The City of Illusions!! (ウルトラマン80登場! まぼろしの街!!, Urutoraman Eiti Tōjō! Maboroshi no Machi!!)
74. Winner of Fierce Battle! Mebius and the Monster Army!! (激闘の覇者! メビウスと怪獣軍団!!, Gekitō no Hasha! Mebiusu to Kaijū Gundan!!)
75. Ultraman Tiga & Dyna: Warriors of the Star of Light Chapter 1: The Heartless Light (ウルトラマンティガ&ダイナ 光の星の戦士たち 第1章「心なき光」, Urutoraman Tiga Ando Daina: Hikari no Hoshi no Senshi-tachi Dai Isshō "Kokoro Naki Hikari")
76. Ultraman Tiga & Dyna: Warriors of the Star of Light Chapter 2: The Shadow of Fear (ウルトラマンティガ&ダイナ 光の星の戦士たち 第2章「恐怖の影」, Urutoraman Tiga Ando Daina: Hikari no Hoshi no Senshi-tachi Dai Nishō "Kyōfu no Kage")
77. Ultraman Tiga & Dyna: Warriors of the Star of Light Chapter 3: Dyna Dies (ウルトラマンティガ&ダイナ 光の星の戦士たち 第3章「ダイナ死す」, Urutoraman Tiga Ando Daina: Hikari no Hoshi no Senshi-tachi Dai Sanshō "Daina Shisu")
78. Ultraman Tiga & Dyna: Warriors of the Star of Light Final Chapter: Revival of Light (ウルトラマンティガ&ダイナ 光の星の戦士たち 最終章「甦る光」, Urutoraman Tiga Ando Daina: Hikari no Hoshi no Senshi-tachi Saishūshō "Yomigaeru Hikari")
79. Ultraman Zero: Hero Retsuden (ウルトラマンゼロ 英雄列伝, Urutoraman Zero Eiyū Retsuden)
80. Tiga, Dyna, & Ultraman Gaia Chapter 1: We Want to Meet Gamu! (ティガ・ダイナ&ウルトラマンガイア 第1章「我夢に会いたい!」, Tiga Daina & Urutoraman Gaia Dai Isshō "Gamu ni Aitai!")
81. Tiga, Dyna, & Ultraman Gaia Chapter 2: Parallel World (ティガ・ダイナ&ウルトラマンガイア 第2章「パラレルワールド」, Tiga Daina & Urutoraman Gaia Dai Nishō "Parareru Wārudo")
82. Tiga, Dyna, & Ultraman Gaia Chapter 3: Adventure (ティガ・ダイナ&ウルトラマンガイア 第3章「アドベンチャー」, Tiga Daina & Urutoraman Gaia Dai Sanshō "Adobenchā")
83. Tiga, Dyna, & Ultraman Gaia Final Chapter: Battle in Hyperspace (ティガ・ダイナ&ウルトラマンガイア 最終章「超時空の大決戦」, Tiga Daina & Urutoraman Gaia Saishūshō "Chōjikū no Daikessen")
84. The Forbidden Word! Alien Mephilas's Challenge!! (禁じられた言葉! メフィラス星人の挑戦!!, Kinjirareta Kotoba! Mefirasu Seijin no Chōsen!!)
85. The Shapeless Challenger! Ultra Seven Appears!! (姿なき挑戦者! ウルトラセブン登場!!, Sugata Naki Chōsensha! Urutora Sebun Tōjō!!)
86. Ultraman Mebius & Ultra Brothers Chapter 1: The Extraterrestrial Alliance (ウルトラマンメビウス&ウルトラ兄弟 第1章「宇宙人連合」, Urutoraman Mebiusu & Urutora Kyōdai Dai Isshō "Uchūjin Rengō")
87. Ultraman Mebius & Ultra Brothers Chapter 2: The Warriors' Reunion (ウルトラマンメビウス&ウルトラ兄弟 第2章「戦士の再会」, Urutoraman Mebiusu & Urutora Kyōdai Dai Nishō "Senshi no Saikai")
88. Ultraman Mebius & Ultra Brothers Chapter 3: The Veteran Hero (ウルトラマンメビウス&ウルトラ兄弟 第3章「歴戦の勇者」, Urutoraman Mebiusu & Urutora Kyōdai Dai Sanshō "Rekisen no Yūsha")
89. Ultraman Mebius & Ultra Brothers Chapter 4: The Ultimate Super Beast (ウルトラマンメビウス&ウルトラ兄弟 第4章「究極超獣」, Urutoraman Mebiusu & Urutora Kyōdai Dai Yonshō "Kyūkyoku Chōjū")
90. Ultraman Mebius & Ultra Brothers Final Chapter: Infinity (ウルトラマンメビウス&ウルトラ兄弟 最終章「インフィニティー」, Urutoraman Mebiusu & Urutora Kyōdai Saishūshō "Infinitī")
91. Revival from Darkness! Revive, Ultraman!! (闇からの復活! 甦れウルトラマン!!, Yami kara no Fukkatsu! Yomigaere Urutoraman!!)
92. Revival of King Joe!? Ultra Seven's Great Decisive Battle!! (キングジョー復活!? ウルトラセブン大決戦!!, Kingu Jō Fukkatsu!? Urutora Sebun Daikessen!!)
93. Welcome to the Earth! The Science on Planet Baltan!! (ようこそ地球へ! バルタン星の科学!!, Yōkoso Chikyū e! Barutan Sei no Kagaku!!)
94. Welcome to the Earth! Farewell, Alien Baltan!! (ようこそ地球へ! さらばバルタン星人!!, Yōkoso Chikyū e! Saraba Barutan Seijin!!)
95. Gaia's Wish! Agul's Determination!! (ガイアの願い! アグルの決意!!, Gaia no Negai! Aguru no Ketsui!!)
96. Gaia's Crisis! Agul's Revival!! (ガイアの危機! 復活のアグル!!, Gaia no Kiki! Fukkatsu no Aguru!!)
97. Taro to the Earth! Mebius, the Day of Separation!? (タロウ地球へ! メビウス、別れの日!?, Tarō Chikyū e! Mebiusu, Wakare no Hi!?)
98. The Flame of Promise! Burning Brave (約束の炎! バーニングブレイブ!!, Yakusoku no Honō! Bāningu Bureibu!!)
99. Formidable Enemy Birdon! Taro in a Desperate Situation!? (強敵バードン! タロウ絶体絶命!?, Kyōteki Bādon! Tarō Zettaizetsumei!?)
100. The Advent of His Majesty Belial! All Hundred Monsters Attack!? (ベリアル陛下降臨! 百体怪獣総進撃!?, Beriaru Heika Kōrin! Hyakutai Kaijū Sōshingeki!?)
101. Fight 80! Formation Yamato to Finish Off!! (戦え80! 必殺のフォーメーション・ヤマト!!, Tatakae Eiti! Hissatsu no Fōmēshon Yamato!!)
102. Mebius vs. Leo! Thought of a Man Without a Home!! (メビウス対レオ!? 故郷のない男の想い!!, Mebiusu Tai Reo!? Furusato no Nai Otoko no Omoi!!)
103. The Belial Army's Big Rampage! We Are the Darkness Five!! (大暴れベリアル軍団! 我らダークネスファイブ!!, Ōabare Beriaru Gundan! Warera Dākunesu Faibu!!)
104. Ultraman Zero! Determination of a New Battle!! (ウルトラマンゼロ! 新たな戦いへの決意!!, Urutoraman Zero! Aratana Tatakai e no Ketsui!!)
105. Encounter With the Light (光との出会い, Hikari to no Deai)
106. Town Where Stars Fall (星の降る町, Hoshi no Furu Machi)
107. A Midsummer Night's Dream (夏の夜の夢, Natsu no Yoru no Yume)
108. The Twin-Headed Flame Beast (双頭の火炎獣, Sōtō no Kaenjū)
109. The Idol Is Ragon (アイドルはラゴン, Aidoru wa Ragon)
110. The Hater of Dreams (夢を憎むもの, Yume o Nikumu Mono)
111. The Battle for Dreams (夢を懸けた戦い, Yume o Kaketa Tatakai)
112. Alien Valkie's Monster Class! (バルキー星人の怪獣教室!, Barukī Seijin no Kaijū Kyōshitsu!)
113. Special Feature! The Jean Brothers of Steel! (大特集! 鋼鉄のジャン兄弟!, Daitokushū! Kōtetsu no Jan Kyōdai!)
114. Rise, Mebius! Feelings of Comrades (立ち上がれメビウス! 仲間たちの想い, Tachiagare Mebiusu! Nakama-tachi no Omoi)
115. The Suspicious Neighbor! Seven vs. Alien Icarus (怪しい隣人! セブン対イカルス星人, Ayashii Rinjin! Sebun Tai Ikarusu Seijin)
116. Revival! Super Analysis of Tyrant! Part 1 (復活! タイラント超分析! 前編, Fukkatsu! Tairanto Chōbunseki! Zenpen)
117. Revival! Super Analysis of Tyrant! Part 2 (復活! タイラント超分析! 後編, Fukkatsu! Tairanto Chōbunseki! Kōhen)
118. Burn Leo! The Lion's Eyes Shine!! (燃えろレオ! 輝く獅子の瞳!!, Moero Reo! Kagayaku Shishi no Hitomi!!)
119. The Spark Dolls Theater's Monster Research! (スパークドールズ劇団の怪獣大研究!, Supāku Dōruzu Gekidan no Kaijū Daikenkyū!)
120. Mega Monsters Continue! Battle & Rush!! (大怪獣ぞくぞく! バトル&ラッシュ!!, Daikaijū Zokuzoku! Batoru Ando Rasshu!!)
121. The Dreaded Comet Tsuiphon! The 3 Roaring Monsters!! (怪彗星ツイフォン! 吠える３大怪獣!!, Kai Suisei Tsuifon! Hoeru Sandai Kaijū!!)
122. Ginga & Ultra Heroes! A Comparison of Finishing Attacks!! (ギンガ&ウルトラヒーロー! 必殺技くらべ!!, Ginga Ando Urutora Hīrō! Hissatsuwaza Kurabe!!)
123. Max, Acknowledge! Seven vs. Alien Godola (マックス号応答せよ! セブン対ゴドラ星人, Makkusu-gō Ōtō seyo! Sebun Tai Godora Seijin)
124. Mebius and Alien Mates: The Monster Master's Legacy (メビウスとメイツ星人 怪獣使いの遺産, Mebiusu to Meitsu Seijin Kaijūtsukai no Isan)
125. The Closed World (閉ざされた世界, Tozasareta Sekai)
126. The Stolen Ginga Spark (奪われたギンガスパーク, Ubawareta Ginga Supāku)
127. The Jet Black Ultra Brothers (漆黒のウルトラ兄弟, Shikkoku no Urutora Kyōdai)
128. Darkness and Light (闇と光, Yami to Hikari)
129. Your Future (きみの未来, Kimi no Mirai)
130. Shine Ginga! Our Battle!! (輝けギンガ! 俺たちのバトル!!, Kagayake Ginga! Ore-tachi no Batoru!!)
131. The Return of the Spark Dolls Theater (帰ってきたスパークドールズ劇団, Kaettekita Supāku Dōruzu Gekidan)
132. Ultraman vs. Antlar! The Blue Stone of Vallarge (ウルトラマン対アントラー! バラージの青い石, Urutoraman Tai Antorā! Barāji no Aoi Ishi)
133. Ultraman Saga Chapter 1: The Silent Earth (ウルトラマンサーガ 第1章「沈黙の地球」, Urutoraman Sāga Dai Isshō "Chinmoku no Chikyū")
134. Ultraman Saga Chapter 2: Zero's Hardship (ウルトラマンサーガ 第2章「ゼロの苦難」, Urutoraman Sāga Dai Nishō "Zero no Kunan")
135. Ultraman Saga Chapter 3: The Cocoon of Fear (ウルトラマンサーガ 第3章「恐怖の繭」, Urutoraman Sāga Dai Sanshō "Kyōfu no Mayu")
136. Ultraman Saga Chapter 4: The Hero of Revival (ウルトラマンサーガ 第4章「復活の英雄」, Urutoraman Sāga Dai Yonshō "Fukkatsu no Eiyū")
137. Ultraman Saga Chapter 5: The True Fight (ウルトラマンサーガ 第5章「本当の戦い」, Urutoraman Sāga Dai Goshō "Hontō no Tatakai")
138. Ultra Zero Fight: A New Power (ウルトラゼロファイト 新たなる力, Urutora Zero Faito Aratanaru Chikara)
139. Ultraman Ginga Extra Episode: Friends Left Behind (ウルトラマンギンガ番外編 残された仲間, Urutoraman Ginga Bangaihen Nokosareta Nakama)
140. Terrifying Cosmic Rays: Birth of Gavadon (恐怖の宇宙線 ガヴァドン誕生, Kyōfu no Uchūsen Gavadon Tōjō)
141. The Spark Dolls Theater Ace (スパークドールズ劇団A（エース）, Supāku Dōruzu Gekidan Ēsu)
142. Surprise! The World of Mega Monster Rush (驚き! 大怪獣ラッシュの世界, Odoroki! Daikaijū Rasshu no Sekai)
143. Our Future: Ginga Legend (俺たちの未来 ギンガ伝説, Ore-tachi no Mirai Ginga Densetsu)
144. Legend That Is Passed Down! The Ginga Spark of Mystery! (受け継がれる伝説! 神秘のギンガスパーク!, Uketsugareru Densetsu! Shinpi no Ginga Supāku!)
145. Angel Descent: Gaia's Final Decisive Battle! (天使降臨 ガイア最終決戦!, Tenshi Kōrin Gaia Saishū Kessen!)
146. Lost Light! Cry of the Earth (閉ざされた光! 地球の叫び, Tozasareta Hikari! Chikyū no Sakebi)
147. Revival of Light! The Earth Is Ultraman's Star (甦る光! 地球はウルトラマンの星, Yomigaeru Hikari! Chikyū wa Urutoraman no Hoshi)
148. Strongest Team Formed! Mega Monster Triple Rush! (最強チーム結成! 大怪獣トリプルラッシュ!, Saikyō Chīmu Kessei! Daikaijū Toripuru Rasshu!)
149. Revival of Geronimon! The Littlest Hero (ジェロニモン復活! 小さな英雄, Jeronimon Fukkatsu! Chiisana Eiyū)
150. Ultra Zero Fight: Shining Zero Part 1 (ウルトラゼロファイト 輝きのゼロ 前編, Urutora Zero Faito Kagayaki no Zero Zenpen)
151. Ultra Zero Fight: Shining Zero Part 2 (ウルトラゼロファイト 輝きのゼロ 後編, Urutora Zero Faito Kagayaki no Zero Kōhen)
152. Ultra Frontier! Darkness Rush!? (ウルトラフロンティア! ダークネスラッシュ!?, Urutora Furontia! Dākunesu Rasshu!?)
153. Path to Conquest! Departure of the Darkness Five for the Front!! (覇道への道! ダークネスファイブ出陣!!, Hadō e no Michi! Dākunesu Faibu Shutsujin!!)
154. Revival of Tyrant! Ultraman Ginga Theater Special Part 1 (タイラント復活! ウルトラマンギンガ劇場スペシャル・前編, Tairanto Fukkatsu! Urutoraman Ginga Gekijō Supesharu Zenpen)
155. Dark Zagi Attack! Ultraman Ginga Theater Special Part 2 (ダークザギ襲来! ウルトラマンギンガ劇場スペシャル・後編, Dāku Zagi Shūrai! Urutoraman Ginga Gekijō Supesharu Kōhen)
156. The Spark Dolls Theater Taro (スパークドールズ劇団タロウ, Supāku Dōruzu Tarō)
157. Pre-Ultraman Ginga S Special Part I (The New Invaders) (ウルトラマンギンガS 直前スペシャル パートI（新たなる侵略者編）, Urutoraman Ginga Esu Chokuzen Supesharu Pāto Wan (Aratanaru Shinryakusha-hen))
158. Pre-Ultraman Ginga S Special Part II (Ultraman Victory Appears) (ウルトラマンギンガS 直前スペシャル パートII（ウルトラマンビクトリー登場編）, Urutoraman Ginga Esu Chokuzen Supesharu Pāto Tsū (Urutoraman Bikutorī Tōjō-hen))
159. Power to Open Up (切り拓く力, Kirihiraku Chikara)
160. Ginga vs. Victory (ギンガ対ビクトリー, Ginga Tai Bikutorī)
161. Lone Warrior (孤高の戦士, Kokō no Senshi)
162. The Meaning of Strength (強さの意味, Tsuyosa no Imi)
163. Friend and Devil (仲間と悪魔, Nakama to Akuma)
164. Forgotten Past (忘れ去られた過去, Wasuresarareta Kako)
165. Activate! Magnewave Operation (発動! マグネウェーブ作戦, Hatsudō! Magunewēbu Sakusen)
166. Desperate Battle for Sunrise (朝焼けの死闘, Asayake no Shitō)
167. Alien Chibull Exeller's Super Analysis of Five King Part 1 (チブル星人エクセラーのファイブキング超解析 前編, Chiburu Seijin Ekuserā no Faibu Kingu Chōkaiseki Zenpen)
168. Alien Chibull Exeller's Super Analysis of Five King Part 2 (チブル星人エクセラーのファイブキング超解析 後編, Chiburu Seijin Ekuserā no Faibu Kingu Chōkaiseki Kōhen)
169. Ultraman Cosmos 2 Chapter 1: The Shadow of Calamity (ウルトラマンコスモス2 第1章「災いの影」, Urutoraman Kosumosu Tsū Dai Isshō "Wazawai no Kage")
170. Ultraman Cosmos 2 Chapter 2: Star of Life (ウルトラマンコスモス2 第2章「命の星」, Urutoraman Kosumosu Tsū Dai Nishō "Inochi no Hoshi")
171. Ultraman Cosmos 2 Chapter 3: The Return of the Light (ウルトラマンコスモス2 第3章「光の帰還」, Urutoraman Kosumosu Tsū Dai Sanshō "Hikari no Kikan")
172. Ultraman Cosmos 2 Chapter 4: Giant of Justice (ウルトラマンコスモス2 第4章「正義の巨人」, Urutoraman Kosumosu Tsū Dai Yonshō "Seigi no Kyojin")
173. 80's Bond: Teacher of Memories (80の絆 思い出の先生, Eiti no Kizuna Omoide no Sensei)
174. A New Legend: Shining Victory! (新たな伝説 輝くビクトリー!, Aratana Densetsu Kagayaku Bikutorī!)
175. Life to Regain (取り戻す命, Torimodosu Inochi)
176. Holy Sword of the Future (未来への聖剣, Mirai e no Seiken)
177. Gan-Q's Tears (ガンQの涙, Gankyū no Namida)
178. To Meet You (君に会うために, Kimi ni Au Tame ni)
179. Split! UPG (分裂! UPG, Bunretsu! Yū Pī Jī)
180. Revival of Lugiel (復活のルギエル, Fukkatsu no Rugieru)
181. Adventure Called Life (命という名の冒険, Inochi to Iu Na no Bōken)
182. Battle for Tomorrow (明日を懸けた戦い, Asu o Kaketa Tatakai)
183. Glorious Victory: Ultraman Ginga S (栄光の勝利 ウルトラマンギンガS, Eikō no Shōri Urutoraman Ginga Esu)
184. Ultraman Tiga Gaiden: Revival of the Ancient Giant (Part 1) (ウルトラマンティガ外伝 古代に蘇る巨人（前編）, Urutoraman Tiga Gaiden: Kodai ni Yomigaeru Kyojin (Zenpen))
185. Ultraman Tiga Gaiden: Revival of the Ancient Giant (Part 2) (ウルトラマンティガ外伝 古代に蘇る巨人（後編）, Urutoraman Tiga Gaiden: Kodai ni Yomigaeru Kyojin (Kōhen))
186. Dyna Defeated!? The Kraakov Will Not Surface! (ダイナ敗北!? 移動要塞（クラーコフ）浮上せず!, Daina Haiboku!? Kurākofu Fujō Sezu!)
187. A New Battle! Gaia Version-up! (新たなる戦い! ガイア・ヴァージョンアップ!, Aratanaru Tatakai! Gaia Vājon'appu!)
188. Monster Smuggling!? Save Life, Cosmos! (怪獣密輸!? 命を救えコスモス!, Kaijū Mitsuyu!? Inochi o Sukue Kosumosu!)
189. Showdown of Destiny! Nexus vs. Dark Mephisto (宿命の対決! ネクサスVSダークメフィスト, Shukumei no Taiketsu! Nekusasu Bāsasu Dāku Mefisuto)
190. Rise, Max! Proof of a Brave (立ち上がれマックス! 勇士の証明, Tachiagare Makkusu! Yūshi no Shōmei)
191. An Azure Light and Shadow: Save Hikari, Mebius! (群青の光と影 ヒカリを救えメビウス!, Gunjō no Hikari to Kage Hikari o Sukue Mebiusu!)
192. Defend Life: Hero Ultraman Zero! (命を守れ 勇者ウルトラマンゼロ!, Inochi o Mamore Yūsha Urutoraman Zero!)
193. Legendary Victory! Ginga, Seize the Light! (伝説の勝利! ギンガよ光をつかめ!, Densetsu no Shōri! Ginga yo Hikari o Tsukame!)
194. Fight, Ultra 10 Warriors: Etelgar's Threat (戦えウルトラ10勇士 エタルガーの脅威, Tatakae Urutora Jū Yūshi Etarugā no Kyōi)
195. Ultra Galaxy Legend: Destruction of the Land of Light!? (ウルトラ銀河伝説 光の国 壊滅!?, Urutora Ginga Densetsu Hikari no Kuni Kaimetsu!?)
196. Ultra Galaxy Legend: Fate of the Reionyx (ウルトラ銀河伝説 レイオニクスの宿命, Urutora Ginga Densetsu Reionikusu no Shukumei)
197. Ultra Galaxy Legend: Belial's Threat (ウルトラ銀河伝説 ベリアルの脅威, Urutora Ginga Densetsu Beriaru no Kyōi)
198. Ultra Galaxy Legend: Last Hope (ウルトラ銀河伝説 最後の希望, Urutora Ginga Densetsu Saigo no Kibō)
199. Ultra Galaxy Legend: His Name Is Ultraman Zero (ウルトラ銀河伝説 その名はウルトラマンゼロ, Urutora Ginga Densetsu Sono Na wa Urutoraman Zero)
200. Fierce Battle Ultraman Zero: Salome's Challenge (激闘ウルトラマンゼロ サロメの挑戦, Gekitō Urutoraman Zero Sarome no Chōsen)
201. Fierce Battle Ultraman Zero: Dimension Storm (激闘ウルトラマンゼロ ディメンジョンストーム, Gekitō Urutoraman Zero Dimenjon Sutōmu)
202. Fierce Battle Ultraman Zero: Teacher and Student United Front! (激闘ウルトラマンゼロ 師弟共闘!, Gekitō Urutoraman Zero Shitei Kyōtō!)
203. Fierce Battle Ultraman Zero: True Prologue (激闘ウルトラマンゼロ 真の序章, Gekitō Urutoraman Zero Shin no Joshō)
204. Fierce Battle Ultraman Zero: Fateful Encounter (激闘ウルトラマンゼロ 運命の出会い, Gekitō Urutoraman Zero Unmei no Deai)
205. Fierce Battle Ultraman Zero: Entrusted Hope (激闘ウルトラマンゼロ 託された希望, Gekitō Urutoraman Zero Takusareta Kibō)
206. Fierce Battle Ultraman Zero: Bonds of Comrades (激闘ウルトラマンゼロ 仲間達の絆, Gekitō Urutoraman Zero Nakama-tachi no Kizuna)
207. Fierce Battle Ultraman Zero: Empire's Fury (激闘ウルトラマンゼロ 帝国の猛威, Gekitō Urutoraman Zero Teikoku no Mōi)
208. Fierce Battle Ultraman Zero: Ultimate Force Zero (激闘ウルトラマンゼロ ウルティメイトフォースゼロ, Gekitō Urutoraman Zero Urutimeito Fōsu Zero)
209. A New Hero Appears: His Name Is Ultraman X (新ヒーロー登場 その名はウルトラマンエックス, Shin Hīrō Tōjō Sono Na wa Urutoraman Ekkusu)
210. Voice from the Starry Sky (星空の声, Hoshizora no Koe)
211. Lots of Possibilities (可能性のかたまり, Kanōsei no Katamari)
212. The Song That Calls the Night (夜を呼ぶ歌, Yoru o Yobu Uta)
213. All For One (オール・フォー・ワン, Ōru Fō Wan)
214. Aegis, Time to Shine (イージス 光る時, Ījisu Hikaru Toki)
215. The Man With the Star's Memories (星の記憶を持つ男, Hoshi no Kioku o Motsu Otoko)
216. Oath That Surpassed the Stars (星を越えた誓い, Hoshi o Koeta Chikai)
217. Encounter and Comrades (出会い そして仲間たち, Deai Soshite Nakama-tachi)
218. The Targeted X (狙われたX, Nerawareta Ekkusu)
219. We Are Nebula! (われら星雲!, Warera Seiun!)
220. Monster Is Not Moving (怪獣は動かない, Kaijū wa Ugokanai)
221. Unknown Friend (未知なる友人, Michi-naru Yūjin)
222. Destination of the Rainbow (虹の行く先, Niji no Yuku Saki)
223. The Sword of Victory (勝利への剣, Shōri e no Tsurugi)
224. Sky Shines, Land Connects (光る大空、繋がる大地, Hikaru Ōzora, Tsunagaru Daichi)
225. The Light of Victory Which Exceeded All Limits (限界を超えた勝利の光, Genkai o Koeta Shōri no Hikari)
226. A Warrior's Back (戦士の背中, Senshi no Senaka)
227. Feature Report! 24 Hours Inside Xio (激撮! Xio密着24時, Gekisatsu! Jio Mitchaku Nijūyoji)
228. The Friend Is a Monster (ともだちは怪獣, Tomodachi wa Kaijū)
229. Wataru's Love (ワタルの恋, Wataru no Koi)
230. Living Together (共に生きる, Tomo ni Ikiru)
231. Bonds -Unite- (絆 -Unite-, Kizuna -Yunaito-)
232. A Beautiful End (美しき終焉, Utsukushiki Shūen)
233. The Rainbow Land (虹の大地, Niji no Daichi)
234. A World United as One (絆でひとつになる世界, Kizuna de Hitotsu ni Naru Sekai)
235. The Lawless Monster Zone! Fight, Ultraman! (怪獣無法地帯! 戦えウルトラマン!, Kaijū Muhō Chitai! Tatakae Urutoraman!)
236. Max in a Fierce Battle! A Distant Friend (激闘マックス! 遥かなる友人, Gekitō Makkusu! Haruka-naru Yūjin)
237. Defend, Mebius! Fanton's Lost Item (守れメビウス! ファントンの落し物, Mamore Mebiusu! Fanton no Otoshimono)
238. A Fake Ultraman Appears!? The Brother from Another Planet (にせウルトラマン現る!? 遊星から来た兄弟, Nise Urutoraman Arawaru!? Yūsei kara Kita Kyōdai)
239. Prophecy of Baradhi: Revival of Antlar! (バラージの預言 アントラー復活!, Barāji no Yogen Antorā Fukkatsu!)
240. Ultra Fight Victory: Holy Sword of Hope (ウルトラファイトビクトリー 希望の聖剣, Urutora Faito Bikutorī Kibō no Seiken)
241. Ultra Fight Victory: Melody of Victory (ウルトラファイトビクトリー 勝利の旋律, Urutora Faito Bikutorī Shōri no Senritsu)
242. Hero from the Distant Past! His Name Is Ultraman Tiga! (超古代からの勇者! その名はウルトラマンティガ!, Chō Kodai kara no Yūsha! Sono Na wa Urutoraman Tiga!)
243. Showdown! Ultra 10 Warriors!! Chapter 1: Sealed Light (決戦! ウルトラ10勇士!! 第一章・封じられた光, Kessen! Urutora Jū Yūshi!! Dai Isshō Fūjirareta Hikari)
244. Showdown! Ultra 10 Warriors!! Chapter 2: Ultimate Warrior (決戦! ウルトラ10勇士!! 第二章・究極の戦士, Kessen! Urutora Jū Yūshi!! Dai Nishō Kyūkyoku no Senshi)
245. Showdown! Ultra 10 Warriors!! Final Chapter: The Birth That Bonds Power (決戦! ウルトラ10勇士!! 最終章・絆が生む力, Kessen! Urutora Jū Yūshi!! Saishūshō Kizuna ga Umu Chikara)
246. Zetton Invasion! Farewell, Ultraman (ゼットン襲来! さらばウルトラマン, Zetton Shūrai! Saraba Urutoraman)
247. Heroes of Light: Ultra Hero Legend (光の勇者たち・ウルトラヒーロー伝説, Hikari no Yūsha-tachi Urutora Hīrō Densetsu)
248. First Ultraman Advent! Ultra Operation Number One (初代ウルトラマン降臨! ウルトラ作戦第一号, Shodai Urutoraman Kōrin! Urutora Sakusen Dai Ichigō)
249. Max's Last Battle! Prelude to Ground Annihilation (マックス最後の戦い! 地上壊滅の序曲, Makkusu Saigo no Tatakai! Chijō Kaimetsu no Jokyoku)
250. Max Rescue Operation: Hold on to! Future (マックス救出作戦 つかみとれ! 未来, Makkusu Kyūshutsu Sakusen Tsukamitore! Mirai)
251. Type Change Hero! Tiga and Warriors of Light (タイプチェンジヒーロー! ティガと光の戦士たち, Taipu Chenji Hīrō! Tiga to Hikari no Senshi-tachi)
252. Jack vs. Bemstar: Ultra Seven Has Arrived (ジャック対ベムスター ウルトラセブン参上, Jakku Tai Bemusutā Urutora Sebun Sanjō)
253. The Final Battle! Farewell Taro! Mother of Ultra! (最終決戦! さらばタロウよ! ウルトラの母よ!, Saishū Kessen! Saraba Tarō yo! Urutora no Haha yo!)
254. Leo, Jack Coalition! Eternal Vows of the Ultra Brothers (レオ・ジャック共闘! ウルトラ兄弟永遠の誓い, Reo Jakku Kyōtō! Urutora Kyōdai Eien no Chikai)
255. Fight, Ultra Warriors! Blade of Justice That Cuts Through Evil! (戦えウルトラ戦士! 悪を切り裂く正義の刃!, Tatakae Urutora Senshi! Aku o Kirisaku Seigi no Yaiba!)
256. Mebius' Final Battle! Advent of the Emperor (メビウス最後の戦い! 皇帝の降臨, Mebiusu Saigo no Tatakai! Kōtei no Kōrin)
257. Mebius' Desperate Situation! Dark Clouds of Despair (メビウス絶体絶命! 絶望の暗雲, Mebiusu Zettai Zetsumei! Zetsubō no An'un)
258. Take Flight, Mebius! Words from the Heart (はばたけメビウス! 心からの言葉, Habatake Mebiusu! Kokoro kara no Kotoba)
259. Grand Finale! Ultra Warriors Forever! (グランドフィナーレ! ウルトラ戦士よ永遠に!, Gurando Fināre! Urutora Senshi yo Eien ni!)

== Ultra Zero Fight ==
To draw success to the film Ultraman Saga, A new segment to the series that started in episode 57 debuted entitled "Ultra Zero Fight" (ウルトラゼロファイト, Urutora Zero Faito). Ultra Zero Fight is an Action/Drama series of 3-minute episodes that showcased new forms that the main character, Ultraman Zero acquires as he faces his adversaries. The segment itself is a tribute to the low-budget minisodes of Ultra Fight.

Parts

1. A New Power (新たなる力, Aratanaru Chikara): 8 episodes. From episode 57 to episode 64.
2. Shining Zero (輝きのゼロ, Kagayaki no Zero): 15 episodes. From episode 76 to episode 91 (excluding episode 79).

== Ultraman Ginga ==
"Ultraman Ginga" (ウルトラマンギンガ, Urutoraman Ginga) is part of New Ultraman Retsuden comprising episodes 2-7 and 21-25, and with the Theatrical Special being aired as episodes 50 and 51.

== Mega Monster Rush: Ultra Frontier ==
"Mega Monster Rush: Ultra Frontier" (大怪獣ラッシュ ウルトラフロンティア, Daikaijū Rasshu Urutora Furontia) is part of New Ultraman Retsuden and is a fully CG movie of 3-minute episodes. It is an adaption of the video game of the same title.

Parts

1. Red King Hunting: 3 episodes. From episode 12 to episode 14.
2. Neronga Hunting: 2 episodes. From episode 15 to episode 16.
3. Antlar Hunting: 4 episodes. From episode 29 to episode 32.
4. Super-Earth Gomora Hunting: 3 episodes with subtitles; Powerful Enemy! Defeat Earth Gomora! (強敵! アースゴモラに挑め!, Kyōteki! Āsu Gomora ni Idome!), Hunting of Flame! The Rush Hunters Strike Back (炎のハンティング! 逆襲のラッシュハンターズ, Honō no Hantingu! Gyakushū no Rasshu Hantāzu), and Evil! Jailbreak Hunters! (凶悪! 脱獄ハンターズ!, Kyōaku! Datsugoku Hantāzu!). From episode 52 to episode 54.
5. Gandar Hunting: 3 episodes with subtitles; Hunting of Silver! (白銀のハンティング!, Hakugin no Hantingu!), Elusive! Demon King of Ice Gandar! (神出鬼没! 氷の魔王ガンダー!, Shinshutsukibotsu! Kōri no Maō Gandā!), and Decisive Battle! Gandar vs. the Rush Hunters (決戦! ガンダー対ラッシュハンターズ, Kessen! Gandā Tai Rasshu Hantāzu). From episode 63 to episode 65.
6. King Joe Hunting: 2 episodes with subtitles; Hunting in Space! Battle in a Belt of Asteroids! (宇宙のハンティング! 小惑星帯の戦い!, Uchū no Hantingu! Shōwakuseitai no Tatakai!) and There Is Only One Chance! Magna's Sure Shot! (チャンスはいちど! マグナ必殺の一撃!, Chansu wa Ichido! Maguna Hissatsu no Ichigeki!). From episode 66 to episode 67.
7. Plasma Killer Zaurus Hunting: 1 episode with subtitle; Ultimate Hunting! Plasma Killer Zaurus! (究極のハンティング! プラズマキラーザウルス!, Kyūkyoku no Hantingu! Purazuma Kirā Zaurusu!). Episode 68.

== Ultraman Ginga S ==
"Ultraman Ginga S" (ウルトラマンギンガS, Urutoraman Ginga Esu) is part of New Ultraman Retsuden comprising episodes 55-62 and 71-78, and with the movie having been broadcast as episodes 139-141.

== Ultra Fight Victory ==
"Ultra Fight Victory" (ウルトラファイトビクトリー, Urutora Faito Bikutorī) is part of New Ultraman Retsuden and is a series of 3-minute episodes that featured a new form of the main character. The series itself is a tribute to the low-budget minisodes of Ultra Fight.

== Ultraman X ==
"Ultraman X" (ウルトラマンX, Urutoraman Ekkusu) is part of New Ultraman Retsuden comprising episodes 106-130, with episodes 113, 121, and 130 being recap specials.

== Cast ==
Ultraman Retsuden

- Musashi Haruno (春野 ムサシ, Haruno Musashi; 34): Taiyo Sugiura (杉浦 太陽, Sugiura Taiyō)
- Shin Asuka (アスカ・シン, Asuka Shin; 38): Takeshi Tsuruno (つるの 剛士, Tsuruno Takeshi)
- Rei (レイ; 57-61): Shota Minami (南 翔太, Shōta Minami)
- Mamoru Miyano (宮野 真守, Miyano Mamoru; 72; Singer cameo)
- Gamu Takayama (高山 我夢, Takayama Gamu; 80-83, 95, 96): Takeshi Yoshioka (吉岡 毅志, Yoshioka Takeshi)
- Hiroya Fujimiya (藤宮 博也, Fujimiya Hiroya; 95, 96): Hassei Takano (高野 八誠, Takano Hassei)

New Ultraman Retsuden

- Hikaru Raido (礼堂 ヒカル, Raidō Hikaru; 1, 8, 10, 12, 13, 18, 20, 26, 36, 39-45): Takuya Negishi (根岸 拓哉, Negishi Takuya)
- Misuzu Isurugi (石動 美鈴, Isurugi Misuzu; 1): Mio Miyatake (宮武 美桜, Miyatake Mio)
- Kenta Watarai (渡会 健太, Watarai Kenta; 1): Mizuki Ohno (大野 瑞生, Ōno Mizuki)
- Chigusa Kuno (久野 千草, Kuno Chigusa; 1): Kirara (雲母)
- Arisa Sugita (杉田 アリサ, Sugita Arisa; 90-103): Yukari Taki (滝 裕可里, Taki Yukari)
- Gōki Matsumoto (松本 ゴウキ, Matsumoto Gōki; 90-103): Takahiro Kato (加藤 貴宏, Katō Takahiro)
- Daichi Ozora (大空 大地, Ōzora Daichi; 131-142): Kensuke Takahashi (高橋 健介, Takahashi Kensuke)
- Mamoru Mikazuki (三日月 マモル, Mikazuki Mamoru; 131-134, 136, 137, 139-142): Hayato Harada (原田 隼人, Harada Hayato)
- Rui Takada (高田 ルイ, Takada Rui; 131-134, 136, 137, 139-142): Haruka Momokawa (百川 晴香, Momokawa Haruka)

=== Voice actors ===
Ultraman Retsuden

- Ultraman Zero (ウルトラマンゼロ, Urutoraman Zero): Mamoru Miyano
- Zoffy (ゾフィー, Zofī; 35, 39, 86-90): Hideyuki Tanaka (田中 秀幸, Tanaka Hideyuki)
- Mirror Knight (ミラーナイト, Mirā Naito; 62-64): Hikaru Midorikawa (緑川 光, Midorikawa Hikaru)
- Glenfire (グレンファイヤー, Gurenfaiyā; 62-64, 79, 104): Tomokazu Seki (関 智一, Seki Tomokazu)
- Alien Mefilas "Sly of the Dark Magic" (メフィラス星人 魔導のスライ, Mefirasu Seijin Madō no Surai; 79, 100, 103): Hiroki Yasumoto (安元 洋貴, Yasumoto Hiroki)
- Ultraman Belial (ウルトラマンベリアル, Urutoraman Beriaru; 100, 103): Yūki Ono (小野 友樹, Ono Yūki)
- Alien Temperor "Villainous of the Villainy" (テンペラー星人 極悪のヴィラニアス, Tenperā Seijin Gokuaku no Viraniasu; 100, 103): Holly Kaneko (金子 はりい, Kaneko Harii)
- Alien Groza "Glocken of the Freezing" (グローザ星系人 氷結のグロッケン, Gurōza Seikeijin Hyōketsu no Gurokken; 100, 103): Kōichi Toshima (外島 孝一, Toshima Kōichi)
- Alien Hipporito "Jathar of the Hell" (ヒッポリト星人 地獄のジャタール, Hipporito Seijin Jigoku no Jatāru; 104): Tetsuo Kishi (岸 哲生, Kishi Tetsuo)
- Narration: Yūji Machi (真地 勇志, Machi Yūji; 1, 5, 13), Takuji Kawakubo (川久保 拓司, Kawakubo Takuji; 19)

New Ultraman Retsuden

- Ultra Seven (ウルトラセブン, Urutora Sebun; 1): Kohji Moritsugu (森次 晃嗣, Moritsugu Kōji)
- Ultraman (ウルトラマン, Urutoraman; 1): Susumu Kurobe (黒部 進, Kurobe Susumu)
- Zoffy (1): Hideyuki Tanaka
- Alien Valky (バルキー星人, Barukī Seijin; 8, 38, 53, 90, 100): Tatsuya Hashimoto (橋本 達也, Hashimoto Tatsuya)
- Ultraman Zero (9, 11, 14, 19, 28-33, 46, 47, 96-104, 139-141, 148, 150, 151, 155): Mamoru Miyano
- Glenfire (9, 11, 34, 100, 101, 104), Alien Icarus (イカルス星人, Ikarusu Seijin; 10-13, 38, 51, 53, 90, 100): Tomokazu Seki
- Ultraman Taro (ウルトラマンタロウ, Urutoraman Tarō; 10, 12, 13, 17, 18, 20, 52, 54): Hiroya Ishimaru (石丸 博也, Ishimaru Hiroya)
- Black King (ブラックキング, Burakku Kingu; 15-17, 27, 52), Alien Hipporit "Jathar of the Hell" (49): Tetsuo Kishi
- Thunder Darambia (サンダーダランビア, Sandā Daranbia; 15-17, 27): Kenta Matsumoto (松本 健太, Matsumoto Kenta)
- Kemur Man (ケムール人, Kemūru Jin; 15, 16, 27, 52), Doragory (ドラゴリー, Doragorī; 16), Alien Groza "Glocken of the Freezing" (48, 49): Kōichi Toshima
- King Pandon (キングパンドン, Kingu Pandon; 15, 16, 27, 52), Ragon (ラゴン; 15, 16, 27, 52): Akiko Tanaka (田中晶子, Tanaka Akiko)
- Alien Nackle "Gray" (ナックル星人グレイ, Nakkuru Seijin Gurei; 38, 53, 90, 100): Kunji Hirano (平野 勲人, Hirano Kunji)
- Ultraman Ginga (ウルトラマンギンガ, Urutoraman Ginga; 40-45, 65-70, 79-89, 149, 152-155), Dark Lugiel (ダークルギエル, Dāku Rugieru; 79): Tomokazu Sugita (杉田 智和, Sugita Tomokazu)
- Alien Mephilas "Sly of the Dark Magic" (48, 49): Hiroki Yasumoto
- Alien Temperor "Villainous of the Villainy" (48, 49), Alien Guts "Bolst" (ガッツ星人ボルスト, Gattsu Seijin Borusuto; 63, 64): Holly Kaneko
- Ultraman Belial (49): Yūki Ono
- Alien Chibull "Exceller" (チブル星人エクセラー, Chiburu Seijin Ekuserā; 63, 64): Takuya Eguchi (江口 拓也, Eguchi Takuya)
- Alien Fanton "Guruman" (ファントン星人グルマン, Fanton Seijin Guruman; 132-134, 138, 142): Yasunori Matsumoto (松本 保典, Matsumoto Yasunori)
- Ultraman X (ウルトラマンエックス, Urutoraman Ekkusu; 135, 138-147, 155): Yuichi Nakamura (中村 悠一, Nakamura Yuichi)
- X Devizer (エクスデバイザー, Ekusu Debaizā; 135): Hibiku Yamamura (山村 響, Yamamura Hibiku)
- Narration: Yasunori Matsumoto (105), Kensuke Takahashi (113, 121, 130)

== Songs ==
Opening themes of Ultraman Retsuden

- "Kirameku Mirai" (キラメク未来; "Sparkling Future")
  - Lyrics: Hideki Tama (田靡 秀樹, Tama Hideki)
  - Composition & Arrangement: Takao Konishi (小西 貴雄, Konishi Takao)
  - Artist: Voyager feat. Ultraman Zero (Mamoru Miyano)
  - Episodes: 1-13
- "DREAM FIGHTER"
  - Composition: Hisashi Koyama (小山 寿, Koyama Hisashi)
  - Arrangement: Koichiro Takahashi (高橋 浩一郎, Takahashi Kōichirō)
  - Lyrics & Artist: Mamoru Miyano
  - Episodes: 14-20, 26-39 (Verse 1), 21-25 (Verse 2)
- "Rising High"
  - Lyrics & Composition: Toshihiko Takamizawa (高見沢 俊彦, Takamizawa Toshihiko)
  - Arrangement: Toshihiko Takamizawa with Yuichiro Honda (本田 優一郎, Honda Yūichirō)
  - Artist: Voyager
  - Episodes: 40-52
- "ULTRA STEEL"
  - Lyrics & Composition: Toshihiko Takamizawa
  - Arrangement: Toshihiko Takamizawa with Yuichiro Honda
  - Artist: Takamiy
  - Episodes: 53-65
- "ULTRA FLY"
  - Composition: Hisashi Koyama
  - Arrangement: Koichiro Takahashi
  - Lyrics & Artist: Mamoru Miyano
  - Episodes: 66-78
- "Final Wars!"
  - Lyrics & Composition: Toshihiko Takamizawa
  - Arrangement: Toshihiko Takamizawa with Yuichiro Honda
  - Artist: The Alfee
  - Episodes: 79-90 (Verse 1), 91-104 (Verse 2)

Opening theme of New Ultraman Retsuden

- "Legend of Galaxy ~Ginga no Hasha" (Legend of Galaxy ～銀河の覇者; "Legend of Galaxy ~Champion of the Galaxy")
  - Lyrics & Composition: Toshihiko Takamizawa
  - Arrangement: Toshihiko Takamizawa with Yuichiro Honda
  - Artist: Takamiy with Mamoru Miyano
  - Episodes: 1-7, 14-20 (Verse 1), 8-13, 21-26 (Verse 2)
- "ULTRA BRAVE"
  - Lyrics: DAIGO
  - Composition: Toshihiko Takamizawa
  - Artist: DAIGO with Takamiy
  - Episodes: 27-39
- "Kirameku Mirai ~Yume no Ginga e~" (キラメク未来 ～夢の銀河へ～; "Sparkling Future ~To Galaxy of Dreams~")
  - Lyrics: Hideki Tama
  - Composition & Arrangement: Takao Konishi
  - Artist: Voyager feat. Ultraman Ginga (Tomokazu Sugita)
  - Episodes: 40-52 (Verse 1), 53, 54 (Verse 2)
- "Eiyū no Uta" (英雄の詩; "Hero's Song")
  - Lyrics & Composition: Toshihiko Takamizawa
  - Arrangement: Toshihiko Takamizawa with Yuichiro Honda
  - Artist: The Alfee
  - Episodes: 55-70 (Verse 1), 71-78 (Verse 2)
- "Ultraman Ginga no Uta 2015" (ウルトラマンギンガの歌 2015, Urutoraman Ginga no Uta Nisenjūgo; "The Song of Ultraman Ginga 2015")
  - Lyrics: Hideki Tama, Sei Okazaki (岡崎 聖, Okazaki Sei)
  - Composition & Arrangement: Takao Konishi
  - Artist: Voyager with Hikaru & Show (Takuya Negishi & Kiyotaka Uji) feat. Takamiy
  - Episodes: 79-90
- "Ultraman Victory no Uta 2015" (ウルトラマンビクトリーの歌 2015, Urutoraman Bikutorī no Uta Nisenjūgo; "The Song of Ultraman Victory 2015")
  - Lyrics: Sei Okazaki
  - Composition & Arrangement: Takao Konishi
  - Artist: Voyager with Hikaru & Show (Takuya Negishi & Kiyotaka Uji) feat. Takamiy
  - Episodes: 91-105
- "Ultraman X" (ウルトラマンX, Urutoraman Ekkusu)
  - Lyrics: Masato Ochi (おち まさと, Ochi Masato)
  - Composition & Arrangement: Takao Konishi
  - Artist: Voyager feat. Daichi Ozora (Kensuke Takahashi) / Voyager feat. Project DMM
  - Episodes: 106-121 (Verse 1), 122-130 (Verse 2) / 131-142
- Unite ~Kimi to Tsunagaru Tame ni~ (Unite ～君とつながるために～; "Unite ~To Unite With You~")
  - Lyrics: TAKERU, Chiaki Seshimo (瀬下 千晶, Seshimo Chiaki)
  - Composition & Arrangement: Takao Konishi
  - Artist: Voyager feat. Project DMM
  - Episodes: 143-155
