= List of Ultraman Leo characters =

This is a list of characters for the 1974 Ultra Series Ultraman Leo.

== Protagonists ==
=== Ultraman Leo ===
Ultraman Leo (ウルトラマンレオ, Urutoraman Reo) is the titular protagonist of his series, who took on the appearance of 20-year-old Gen Ootori (おゝとり ゲン, Ōtori Gen) (Note: Name is according to the romanization from Crunchyroll subtitle. The Hiragana for Ootori (おゝとり) can also be perceived as おおとり.) and worked as an instructor of Jonan Sports Center. In contrast to the previous Showa Ultras, Leo's home world was the Planet L77 of Leo Constellation (獅子座L77星, Shishi-za Eru Nana-ju Nana Sei) instead of Land of Light in Nebula M78.

Leo was one of the survivors of his home world's destruction by the hands of Alien Magma and his Giras monsters. Ever since adopting a human identity, Gen views Earth as his second home and committed to defend it no matter the cost. Having rescued Seven from Alien Magma, Gen was enrolled into MAC as their seventh member and took over the former's mission to fight against monster threats. Despite his new job, Gen was still permitted to visit Jonan in his free time. Being an Ultraman in disguise, Gen displays excellent body performance and senses but due to his young age, he is prone to make irrational decisions and would even pick a fight with others. However, Gen builds up a character development as the series progressed thanks to his interaction with humans and training provided by Dan, as well as protecting Earth while maintaining friendship with MAC members. By the time MAC was annihilated in episode 40, Gen and Toru live with the Miyama family as they team up to investigate Saucer Monster attacks through his previous experiences. By the end of the season, Gen bids farewell to Toru as he left traveling on a yacht.

As Ultraman Leo, Gen transforms with the Leo Ring (レオリング, Reo Ringu) on his left hand. (Note: In the television series, it was previously named as the Lion's Eyes (獅子の瞳, Shishi no Hitomi).) Being an Ultraman from another world, Leo's time limit on Earth is 2 minutes and 40 seconds, while his abdomen bears the Secret Sign (シークレットサイン, Shīkuretto Sain) that functions as coat of arms for L77 inhabitants. As an Ultraman who uses Space Martial Arts (宇宙拳法, Uchū Kenpō), Leo's main finishing move is Leo Kick (レオキック, Reo Kikku), a flying kick attack with multiple variations of it shown in the series progress. He can also perform beam finishers, such as Leo Cross Beam (レオクロスビーム, Reo Kurosu Bīmu), Dark Shooter (ダークシューター, Dāku Shūtā) and Shooting Beam (シューティングビーム, Shūtingu Bīmu). He can also wield weapons in combat:

- Leo Bracelet (レオブレスレット, Reo Buresuretto): A bracelet that allows him to utilize a syringe in episode 18.
- Leo Nunchaku (レオヌンチャク, Reo Nunchaku): A nunchaku created from factory chimney through his innate powers. Used once in against Alien Kettle.
- Ultra Mantle (ウルトラマント, Urutora Manto): The mantle worn by Ultraman King, given to Leo ever since their fight with Pressure. The cape can transform into Leobrella (レオブレラ, Reoburera) umbrella shield and Ultra Mantle Mirror (ウルトラマントミラー, Urutora Manto Mirā) to escape Alien Mazaras' mirror world.

Gen Ootori is portrayed by Ryu Manatsu (真夏 竜, Manatsu Ryū).

=== Tooru Umeda ===
Tooru Umeda (梅田 トオル, Umeda Tōru) (Note: Name is based on Crunchyroll's translation.) is a 10 year old recurring character who eventually becomes the supporting protagonist. One of the students of Jonan Sports Center, Tooru views Gen as an older brother, especially after being orphaned by Alien Tsuruk and was adopted by Momoko alongside his younger sister Kaoru. With Kaoru and his friends from Jonan Sports Center were killed by Silver Bloome, Tooru lives with the Miyama family. The loss of his family members and his close friends nearly drove Tooru to the point of despair, which Nova exploited but slowly moves on with Gen's moral support. In the final episode, Tooru discovered Gen's identity as Ultraman Leo and was held captive by Commander Black as a leverage for Leo in against Black End until several children that Gen tutored freed him as they beat Commander Black to death. Tooru bids farewell to Gen as they parted ways.

Tooru Umeda is portrayed by Tsunehiro Arai (新井 つねひろ, Arai Tsunehiro).

== MAC ==
The Monster Attacking Crew (モンスターアタッキングクルー, Monsutā Atakkingu Kurū), abbreviated as MAC (マック, Makku), is an attack team which succeeded the Earth Defense Force (地球防衛隊, Chikyū Bōei-tai). The floating headquarters are MAC Stations (MACステーション, Makku Sutēshon), operating above the major cities of United States, Europe, Africa, and Asia. The series' main setting is the Asia branch of MAC, but whereas there are multiple MAC operation bases on Japan, Dan Moroboshi commanded the Space Patrol Team (宇宙パトロール隊, Uchū Patorōru-tai). Differing from past attack teams, there are multiple replacement officers and those who were killed in duty. Eventually in episode 40, all officers except Dan and Gen were killed when Silver Bloome destroyed the Asia branch MAC Station.

Early members

With the exception of Dan and Gen, all officers that debuted in episode 1 had their names revolved around the Japanese words for colors.

- Dan Moroboshi: See below
- Gen Ootori: See above
- Akio Kuroda (黒田 明雄, Kuroda Akio; 1-8): Aged 24 and the first sub captain of MAC Asia branch. He specializes in engineering and was seen remodeling Maccy's engine. Despite being at odds with Gen, he also shows a supportive side towards said junior. He is portrayed by Kenzō Kuroda (黒田 健三, Kuroda Kenzō).
- Ichirō Aoshima (青島 一郎, Aoshima Ichirō; 1-11, 13-16): Aged 22. He is a combat expert and faithful to his mission but is prone to intense emotions in battle. Likewise, he also clashes with Gen but shows occasional supportive attitude in later episodes, to the point of both practicing Karate with several children. He is portrayed by Yūichi Yanagisawa (柳沢 優一, Yanagisawa Yūichi).
- Kiyohiko Akashi (赤石 清彦, Akashi Kiyohiko; 1-16): One of the early members who specializes in mechanics and always went with Kuroda to repair Maccy fighter jets. While usually expressionless, he had once doubted Gen's intuition when they were patrolling in Kuroshio Island. He is also a capable fighter and had once wielded a large MAC Blaster. He is portrayed by Kenji Ōshima (大島 健二, Ōshima Kenji).
- Haruko Momoi (桃井 晴子, Momoi Haruko; 1-10, 16): Aged 18, she is the operator of MAC Station and rarely ever went into battle. She is portrayed by Kyōko Aratama (新玉 恭子, Aratama Kyōko).
- Junko Shirakawa (白川 純子, Shirakawa Junko; 1-40): Aged 20, she is the only early members aside from Dan and Gen to make a recurring appearance in the series. Aside from being a communication officer, she can also descend into aerial combat. When Silver Bloome attacked the MAC Station, Shirakawa tried to escape on a Maccy fighter jet but was killed as well. She is portrayed by Mieko Mita (三田 美枝子, Mita Mieko).

Later additions

- Atsushi Hirayama (平山 あつし, Hirayama Atsushi; 9-18): The next sub captain who replaces Kuroda, he is a formidable fighter despite his stoicism. He is portrayed by Nobuo Hirasawa (平沢 信夫, Hirasawa Nobuo).
- Daisuke Satō (佐藤 大介, Satō Daisuke; 19-40): The final sub-captain, replacing Atsushi in the previous episode. Despite being older than Dan Moroboshi, he is friendly with other members. Daisuke was among those killed in Siver Bloome's raid on MAC Station. He was portrayed by Shigeo Tedzuka (手塚 茂夫, Tedzuka Shigeo).
- Jun Shirato (白土純, Shirato Jun; 6, 17-40): Aged 22 years old, he started as a guest character in episode 6 before making recurring appearances since episode 17. An officer who is proficient in the use of MAC Gun. When his girlfriend was killed by Alien Karly, Jun blamed Gen in his failure to protect her. Jun was among the victims of Silver Bloome's attack on MAC Station. He is portrayed by Masaharu Matsusaka (松坂 雅治, Matsusaka Masaharu).
- Ippei Kajita (梶田 一平, Kajita Ippei; 17-19, 22-40): The replacement officers for Aoshima and Akahashi, who piloted Maccy 2 and/or 3 during combat. He usually works with Gen and Shirakawa and was among the victim's of Silver Bloome's attack. He is portrayed by Takashi Asakura (朝倉 隆, Asakura Takashi).
- Haruko Matsuki (松木 晴子, Matsuki Haruko; 26-40): Momoi's replacement as the operator, who occasionally gets into the battlefield. Silver Bloome's attack on MAC Station occurred during her birthday celebration and was killed in an attempt to escape. She is portrayed by Tomoko Ai (藍 とも子, Ai Tomoko).
- Miyako Ōtsuki (大槻 美也子, Ōtsuki Miyako; 23 & 25): The replacement operator in between Momoi and Matsuki. She is portrayed by Midori Ōhara (大原 みどり, Ōhara Midori).

One-off members

- Suzuki (鈴木; 3): A MAC member who agreed to adopt Tooru and Kaoru after losing their father but his wish is cut short when Suzuki was killed by Alien Tsuruk. He is portrayed by Shinya Kashima (鹿島 信哉, Kashima Shinya).
- Saburō Satō (佐藤 三郎, Satō Saburō; 12): A cheerful adventurer who recently returned from Africa, he volunteered as an honorary member of MAC to counter the threat of monster Bungo. After the fight, Satō parted ways as he left for Himalayas. He is portrayed by Ryūmei Azuma (東 隆明, Azuma Ryūmei).
- Yōji Kitayama (北山 洋二, Kitayama Yōji; 21): A former skier who saved Alien Alpha from Northsatan at sometime prior. He fell in love with the female alien but she left the Earth right after his right foot's operation. He is portrayed by Ken Utata (うたた 賢, Utata Ken).
- Commander Tatakura (高倉司令長官, Takakura Shirei Chōkan; 13, 36, 39): An officer, who despite his good relationship with Dan, is willing to commit hasty decisions, such as destroying the Planet Ultra when it was about to go on a collision course with Earth. He has a daughter named Ayako. He was portrayed by Takashi Kanda (神田 隆, Kanda Takashi).

=== Arsenal ===
- Uniform: The standard uniform of MAC members consist of two-piece MAC Suits (マックスーツ, Makku Sūtsu) and MAC Jacket (マックジャケット, Makku Jyaketto). In early episodes, female members were shown wearing beret as male members wear MAC Helmet (マックヘルメット, Makku Herumetto) in the field, which connected to their communication devices.
- MAC Ceaver (マックシーバー, Makku Shībā): A wristwatch that can detect a monster's presence. Even after MAC's demise, Gen still wear it in episode 42.
- MAC Gun (マックガン, Makku Gan): A handheld pistol with changeable cartridges to different firepower, such as laser and grenades.
- MAC Bazooka (マックバズーカ, Makku Bazūka): A bazooka used to attack Alien Babarue.
- MAC Blaster (マックブラスター, Makku Burasutā): An atomic heat gun with 60,000 degree heat firepower.
- MAC Special Gun Atomic Laser 5 (マック特殊銃アトミックレーザー5, Makku Tokushu-jū Atomikku Rēzā Gō): A medium-sized gun with built-in accuracy system.
- MAC Knife (マックナイフ, Makku Naifu): A combat knife made from manganese steel. First used in episode 11 but was exploited by Alien Vaib two episodes later with Gen framed as a result.
- Special High Speed Camera (特殊ハイスピードカメラ, Tokushu Hai Supīdo Kamera): A camera that Dan used in episode 13 to uncover Alien Vaib's disappearance technique.

=== Mechas and vehicles ===
Aircraft

- Maccy 1 (マッキー1号, Makkī Ichigō): A large spacecraft that moves with the 0.4 times speed of light. Its only appearance were episodes 1, 3 and 40. Although Maccy 1 had its engine retrofitted in the height of Alien Tsuruk's assault, it never went into action again. The jet was among those eaten by Silver Bloome during its assault on MAC Station. Although never shown again in the series, supplementary materials reveal that it was repurposed as a cargo aircraft from Earth to MAC Station.
- Maccy 2 (マッキー2号, Makkī Nigō): A medium jet which always assigned with Maccy 3, it can separate into two different jets, Alpha and Beta. It was among those eaten by Silver Bloome and forcefully pulled out by Leo in battle.
- Maccy 3 (マッキー3号, Makkī Sangō): A fighter jet which Dan usually rides. He also used it to defeat Alien Vaib by ramming into the alien on a kamikaze attack before Leo saved him. It was among those eaten by Silver Bloome and forcefully pulled out by Leo in battle.
- MAC Special Helicopter (マック特殊ヘリコプター, Makku Tokushu Herikoputā): A helicopter that appeared in episode 27, its original prop was repainted from ZAT Dragon in Ultraman Taro. It was used to deliver a peach-shaped capsule to Oni-on.
- Rocket Fighter (ロケット戦闘機, Roketto Sentōki): Space fighters used to intercept Satan Beetle in episode 25.

Vehicles

- MAC Rody (マックロディー, Makku Rodī): An eco-friendly jeep for patrol and combat purpose, powered by a nuclear engine. Equipped with MAC Laser (マックレーザー, Makku Rēzā), Atomic Bazooka (アトミックバズーカ, Atomikku Bazūka) and a time bomb.
- MAC Car (マックカー, Makku Kā): A standard patrol car with no armament.
- MAC Jeep (マックジープ, Makku Jīpu): Patrol jeeps. Different models appear depending on the episode, either an Isuzu Unicab (episode 6) or Mitsubishi J3/J4 (episode 39).

Others

Note: Neither of these vehicles were used in-story.

- MAC Mole (マックモール, Makku Mōru): A subterrene which is only mentioned in MAC no March insert theme.
- MAC Shark (マックシャーク, Makku Shāku): A submarine which was only mentioned in episode 19 and appeared in the opening of episode 28, but saw no actual combat history.

== Other main characters ==
=== Jonan Sports Center ===
Jonan Sports Center (城南スポーツセンター, Jōnan Supōtsu Sentā) is a private organization that promotes sports, with Gen taking the job as an instructor. Although Gen's close friends have died in Silver Bloome's attack, Jonan Sports Center still exists and Gen still maintains his job until the final episode.

- Shōji Ōmura (大村正司, Ōmura Shōji; 1-22): The chief of Jonan Sports Center. He was portrayed by Yū Fujiki (藤木 悠, Fujiki Yū).
- Momoko Yamaguchi (山口 百子, Yamaguchi Momoko; 1-40): Gen's girlfriend, who becomes the caretaker of Tooru and Kaoru after they were orphaned by Alien Tsuruk. She was among the casualties of Silver Bloome's attack on Shinjuku department store. Her hometown was the Kuroshio Island (黒潮島, Kuroshio jima), the place where Alien Magma and Giras Brothers started their attack. She is portrayed by Kaori Okano (丘野 かおり, Okano Kaori).
- Takeshi Nomura (野村 猛, Nomura Takeshi; 1-40): An assistant instructor who aspires to join MAC. He often views Gen as an older brother figure but also served one for the Umeda siblings. He has a childhood friend Reiko, who works as a gymnast in the Sports Center. He was among those killed in Silver Bloome's attack on Shinjuku. He is portrayed by Yukio Itō (伊藤 幸雄, Itō Yukio).
- Kaoru Umeda (梅田カオル, Umeda Kaoru; 1-40): Tooru's younger sister. She died in Silver Bloome's attack on Shinjuku. She is portrayed by Yoshiko Masumoto (増本 美子, Masumoto Yoshiko), who is currently a voice actress working under the stage name Miina Tominaga (冨永 みーな, Tominaga Mīna).

=== Miyama family ===
- Sakiko Miyama (美山 咲子, Miyama Izumi; 40-51): A nurse director that allows Gen and Tooru to take refuge in their home after losing their friends to Silver Bloome. She was once kidnapped by Bunyo as a bait for Leo. She is portrayed by Masumi Harukawa (春川 ますみ, Harukawa Masumi).
- Izumi Miyama (美山 いずみ, Miyama Izumi; 40-51): A Jonan University student and the oldest sibling of Miyama family. She is portrayed by Fujiko Nara (奈良 富士子, Nara Fujiko).
- Ayumi Miyama (美山 あゆみ, Miyama Ayumi; 40-51): The youngest sibling of Miyama sibling and Tooru's classmate. She is portrayed by Kaoru Sugita (杉田 かおる, Sugita Kaoru).

== Other Ultras ==
=== Ultraseven ===
Returning from his titular series, Ultraseven (ウルトラセブン, Urutorasebun) is the third member of the Ultra Brothers who reassumed his human alias Dan Moroboshi (モロボシ・ダン, Moroboshi Dan) while leading the Space Patrol branch of MAC, therefore becoming Gen's closest ally and confidant during his active period as Ultraman Leo.

Following Ultraman Taro's departure at the end of his tenure on Earth, Seven returned to lead MAC in the fight against a new wave of alien invasions, the first and foremost being Alien Magma and the Giras Brothers. The fight however ended with his right leg sprained as Leo covered for his escape, resulting in his damaged Ultra Eye in the process. Without the ability to transform, Dan instead relegated his position into Gen's trainer in arranging newer strategies whenever Leo was overwhelmed in the fight against alien invaders. Dan was briefly compensated with Sevenger by Jack as the Ultra Eye is brought to the Land of Light. In the light of Commander Black's open attack against the MAC headquarters, Dan stayed behind to ensure Gen's escape, but was revealed to have survived and contacted the latter in telepathy as a form of encouragement against Black End.

Dan's injury from Black Giras rendering him forced to use a crutch as a support, while maintaining his ability to use psychokinesis, albeit briefly before his injury took its toll. As revealed in the novel Ultraman Mebius Anderes Horizont, Seven was teleported to the Land of Light by Mother of Ultra before Silverbloome could devour him, where his leg injury was treated and presented with the repaired Ultra Eye to restore his Ultraseven form. Mamoru Uchiyama's The Ultraman manga however has Dan killed in said attack, only to be revived alongside the rest of Ultra Brothers in time to confront Jackal and his army.

Kohji Moritsugu (森次晃嗣, Moritsugu Kōji) reprises his role as Dan Moroboshi. In episode 51, Ultraseven is voiced by Kenji Nakagawa (中川 謙二, Nakagawa Kenji).

=== Astra ===
Astra (アストラ, Asutora) is the younger brother of Ultraman Leo, who as well survive their planet's destruction and occasionally forms the tag team duo Leo Brothers (レオ兄弟, Reo Kyōdai). Aside from being a younger brother, he was an identical twin to Leo, but received a surgery that altered his face as a result of treating his injuries. Being a former captor of the Alien Magma race, the Magmatic Chain (マグマチックチェーン, Magumachikku Chēn) on his left thigh serves as a reminder from his fateful day before Ultraman King rescued him.

Astra first appeared in episode 22 to help Leo in fighting against monster siblings Gallon and Litter. Ever since then, he would appear to help his brother in occasional moments. In a two parter episode 38–39, Astra was left frozen and impersonated by Alien Babarue to steal the Ultra Key from the Planet Ultra and put it on a collision course with Earth. Ultraman King would later on expose Babarue's deception, allowing Leo to save his younger brother and undo the damages his impostor had made. Astra's final appearance was assisting Leo in against Saucer Monster Hungler.

Instead of assuming a human form, Astra wanders alone in space and only returns when he is needed. In contrast to Leo's Space Kenpo and Karate, Astra fights with kickboxing. By himself, Astra can manipulate sunlight as a blinding light force, performing Astra Chop (アストラチョップ, Asutora Choppu) and shrinks his body with Ultra Reduction (ウルトラリダクション, Urutora Ridakushon) to destroy an opponent from within. Alongside Leo, Astra can perform combination attacks, such as Ultra Double Flasher (ウルトラダブルフラッシャー, Urutora Daburu Furasshā) and Ultra Double Spark (ウルトラダブルスパーク, Urutora Daburu Supāku). In Ultraman Fighting Evolution 3, Astra can perform Astra Kick (アストラキック, Asutora Kikku) and Leo's Red Shuriken Beam (レッド手裏剣ビーム, Reddo Shuriken Bīmu).

In episodes 38 and 39, Astra is voiced by Junji Maruyama (丸山 純二, Maruyama Junji).

=== Ultraman King ===
Ultraman King (ウルトラマンキング, Urutoraman Kingu) is a legendary Ultra who lives alone in Planet King (キング星, Kingu Sei), aged 300,000 years old. In the past, King had rescued Astra from Alien Magma's captivity but was unable to destroy the Magmatic Chain on his left thigh.

King first appeared in episode 26 to help Leo after he was shrunken by an alien sorcerer Pressure, giving the former his Ultra Mantle as an advantage in combat. When Alien Babarue posed as Astra to stir up the conflict between Leo and the Ultra Brothers, King interfered and exposed Babarue's treachery as he broke the Ultra Key while informing Leo of Astra's actual location. After Leo was horribly dismembered by Commander Black, King uses King Revival Ray (キング再生光線, Kingu Saisei Kōsen) to reconstitute the former in the nick of time to stop Bunyo's reign of terror.

Ultraman King's known features are the Ultra Mantle, which he gave one to Leo and the King Top (キングトップ, Kingu Toppu) belt that allows him to perceive events in multiverse. With the King Hammer (キングハンマー, Kingu Hanmā), he can regrow Ultraman Leo back to his original size. His main attacks are King Flasher (キングフラッシャー, Kingu Furasshā) beam, King Spark (キングスパーク, Kingu Supāku) lightning and Baptism Ray (洗礼光線, Senrei Kōsen) to expose an impostor.

Ultraman King is voiced by Motomu Kiyokawa (清川 元夢, Kiyokawa Motomu) in episode 39 and Hiroshi Masuoka (増岡 弘, Masuoka Hiroshi) in episode 50.

=== Inter-Galactic Defense Force ===
- Father of Ultra (ウルトラの父, Urutora no Chichi; 38): The Supreme Commander of the group, he was mentioned in a flashback for using the Ultra Key to detonate a lone Planet Demos (デモス一等星, Demosu Ittōsei) from crashing Planet Ultra.
- Ultra Brothers (ウルトラ兄弟, Urutora Kyōdai; 38-39): A brothers-in-arms group of Ultramen who previously defended the Earth before Leo's arrival. When Babarue posed as Imit-Astra to steal the Ultra Key, the Ultra Brothers were at war with the Leo Brothers on Earth until King appeared and exposed the evil alien's deception. With Astra's name cleared, the Leo Brothers are invited to the team.
  - Zoffy (ゾフィ, Zofi): He is voiced by Satohiro Sakai (酒井 郷博, Sakai Satohiro).
  - Original Ultraman (初代ウルトラマン, Shodai Urutoraman): See here
  - Returned Ultraman (帰ってきたウルトラマン, Kaettekita Urutoraman): See here
  - Ultraman Ace (ウルトラマンA, Urutoraman Ēsu): He is voiced by Shingo Toyokawa (豊川 晋吾, Toyokawa Shingo).

=== Melos ===
Melos (メロス, Merosu) is the captain of Inter-Galactic Defense Force's Andromeda Nebula Branch and is one of the protagonists of The Ultraman manga, in addition to Zoffy. When the Jackal Army announce their genocide against the Ultra Warriors, Melos rescued his brethren on Earth and lead the 28 survivors to face the army on Planet Jackal. He was defeated when Jackal feigned his surrender, but Zoffy wore his Cosmo Tector in order to pose as Melos and delay the army while Mother of Ultra revived the slain Ultra Brothers for a counterattack.

Melos wears the Cosmo Tector (コスモテクター, Kosumo Tekutā) armor which granted his a number of arsenals, such as Andrang (アンドラン, Andoran) boomerang and Andro Laser N75 (アンドロレーザーN75, Andoro Rēzā Enu Nanajū-go) shoulder cannons. The armors can telepathically detached and reassemble to his body to his own liking. His main finishing move is Laser Shot Andro Melos (レーザーショットアンドロメロス, Rēzā Shotto Andoro Merosu).

As with all male characters in the 2015 animated adaptation of The Ultraman, Melos is voiced by Kōichi Yamadera (山寺 宏一, Yamadera Kōichi).

== Antagonists ==
=== Alien Magma ===
Sabre Tyrant Alien Magma (サーベル暴君 マグマ星人, Sāberu Bōkun Maguma Seijin; 1, 2, 30) is an evil alien who had destroyed countless planets, including Leo's home world L77. Ultraman Regulos would establish the individual(s) in Ultraman Leo as part of the Magma Invasion Army.

In episodes 1 and 2, he is the black-caped Heavy Armed Type (重武装タイプ, Jū Busō Taipu), equipped with a 25-meter-long pata Magma Saber (マグマサーベル, Maguma Sāberu) that can fire Laser Ray (レーザー光線, Rēzā Kōsen) on his right arm and Magma Hook (マグマフック, Maguma Fukku) on his left arm. Alien Magma had sent both the Giras twins on Earth to sink Japan, fighting against Seven before Leo appeared to save him. In his second appearance, Leo's necessity for vengeance against Magma caused him to lose the fight. When Leo finally killed the Giras twins in their final confrontation, Magma was forced to retreat.

In episode 30, Alien Magma returned in an attempt to court the beautiful monster Rolan. While assaulting her for refusing his proposal, Gen in Maccy 3 opened fire to give Rolan a chance to escape. Magma would shrunk to human size and hunt several kids who possessed pinwheels made by Rolan. When Rolan was about to leave Earth, Magma tried to kill her as penance for refusing his proposal until Leo interfered, using her pinwheel to pierce through Magma's heart, finally avenging his parents on Planet L77. While lacking the mantle, Magma retained the same abilities and weapon as first episode in addition to Arrow Ray (アロー光線, Arō Kōsen), shooting a stream of needles from his hand.

The Alien Magma in episodes 1 and 2 is portrayed by Yoshihisa Uragami (浦上 嘉久, Uragami Yoshihisa). The identity of the Alien Magma in episode 30 is ambiguous, as the episode itself and magazine Ultraman Pictorial: Warrior of Light's 35 Years Steps (ウルトラマン画報 光の戦士三十五年の歩み, Urutoraman Gahō Hikari no Senshi Sanjūgo-nen no Ayumi) claimed him to be the same Magma from episodes 1 and 2 whereas other magazines would contradict this theory.

=== Ultra Killer Gorgo ===
Hitman Alien Ultra Killer Gorgo (殺し屋宇宙人 ウルトラキラーゴルゴ, Koroshiya Uchūjin Urutora Kirā Gorugo) is an alien bounty hunter known for his reputation in outer space. According to Dan and Kotaro, Gorgo is powerful enough to kill an Ultra Warrior, so much so that only Ultraman Ace's Space Q can kill him. Gorgo was hired by Alien Magma to kill Ultraman Leo in exchange of a planet under his rule. When Magma was discovered threatening Leo with his comrades at Jonan Sports Center, Gorgo forfeited the match and decided to fight Leo under fair terms, going as far as to allow his opponent to bring an ally with him as penance from earlier. Unfortunately this become his undoing as Dan summoned Kotaro, who becomes Taro and performed Double Strium Ray against Gorgo to kill the bounty hunter.

=== Alien Babarue ===
Dark Alien Alien Babarue (暗黒星人 ババルウ星人, Ankoku Seijin Babarū Seijin; 38, 39) is the ruler of the dark universe (暗黒宇宙の支配者, Ankoku Uchū no Shihai-sha) who was the feared opponent of the Ultra Brothers, having targeted the Planet Ultra and fought them in numerous occasions.

After freezing Astra, Babarue took the form of Imit-Astra (にせアストラ, Nise Asutora) and steal the Ultra Key (ウルトラキー, Urutora Kī) to send the Land of Light towards a collision with Earth. When the Ultra Brothers arrived on Earth, Imit-Astra deceived Leo into protecting him from the Ultra Brothers, to the point of being a forced meat shield from their combined attack until Ultraman King arrived and exposed Babarue's true identity, breaking the Key so he couldn't use it for its alternate purpose, a superweapon capable of blowing planets to pieces with a single shot. As the Land of Light continued on its course to Earth, Babarue's plan almost came to fruition, but Leo rescued Astra, commencing the plan to save both planets. While Astra took the Ultra Key to the Land of Light to be repaired and reinstated, Leo faced Babarue in battle and destroyed him, ending the alien's plans for the destruction of Earth and the Land of Light.

Babarue's main weapons were a Kusari-fundo launched from his left arm and a retractable arm cutter on his right. He can also perfectly disguise as an Ultraman without any traces of flaws.

Alien Babarue is voiced by Motomu Kiyokawa, who also voiced King the same episodes that the former appeared. Meanwhile, his disguise as Astra is voiced by the former's voice actor, Junji Maruyama.

=== Commander Black ===
Commander Black (ブラック指令, Burakku Shirei; 40-51) (Note: The kanji "指令" is actually read as "Directive", sharing the same pronunciation with Commander (司令, Shirei). This is a result of a typing error in the show, thus the English notation is indeed "Commander" by official sources.) is a mysterious man clad in black clothing who commanded the Saucer Monster attacks on Earth, using Silver Bloome to kill and consume almost everyone in MAC, with only Dan and Gen escaping with their lives. Although his reason to invade Earth was never specified, the 2001 magazine Kokoro ni Ultraman Leo (心にウルトラマンレオ, Kokoro ni Urutoraman Reo; Within Ultraman Leo's Heart) reveals that Commander Black invaded Earth to avenge Babarue's death, with his position as an invader is bigger than Alien Magma.

With the crystal ball in his possession, Commander Black directed his Saucer Creatures from Black Star to invade Earth. However, as all of them were beaten by Ultraman Leo, Black summoned his last Saucer Creature Black End to challenge Leo into a final showdown and kidnap Tooru as his hostage until a group of children led by Ayumi attacked him. Tooru would later be freed and threw Commander Black's crystal ball to Leo, who used it to defeat Black End. With his Saucer Monster destroyed, Commander Black was reduced to a pile of bubbles in his final breath.

Commander Black is portrayed by Takeshi Ōbayashi (大林 丈史, Ōbayashi Takeshi).

=== Saucer Creatures ===
The Saucer Creatures (円盤生物, Enban Seibutsu; 40-51) (Note: In Crunchyroll, it is translated as either "Saucer Race" or "living flying saucer", the latter from episode 40.) are a type of Kaiju deployed from the demonic planet Black Star (ブラックスター, Burakku Sutā). Through Commander Black's crystal ball, the Black Star would send a Saucer Monster as Leo destroyed them one-by-one. When Black End, the final Saucer Monster defeated, the Black Star try to destroy Earth on a collision course until Leo destroys it with Shooting Beam. Following the destruction of Black Star, Roberuga (ロベルガー, Roberugā) - a new Saucer Monster unrelated to the original set but connected to them by being formed from the wreckage of Black Star - appears in Ultraman Mebius, which takes place 34 years later in the main continuity's timeline.

With the exception of Bunyo, they are shown to be a composite of Earth creature and astrobiology. Befitting their race, they can turn themselves into flying saucers for easy transportation. Several of them can shrink into the size of humans, allowing them to blend in the human society unnoticed as Leo would only take action upon their return to actual sizes. The destruction of MAC by Silver Bloome leaves Earth with no means of countering alien invasions. Each Saucer Monster displays a different level of intelligence:

- Silver Bloome (シルバーブルーメ, Shirubā Burūme; 40): (Note: Translated as "Silver Blume" in Crunchyroll.) The first Biological Saucer to appear, designed after a jellyfish and a Japanese wind chime. It attacked the MAC Station and a shopping mall in Shinjuku, killing Gen, Dan and Tooru's close friends. At some point of time, Kameda and two of his friends picked a shrunken Silver Bloome as they brought it to school. Tooru and Ayumi recognized it as the same monster that killed his friends but their words fell on deaf ears. At night, their homeroom teacher accidentally provokes Bloome as it devours him and proceeds to attack the school on the next day. During that rainy day, Leo appeared and stop it long enough for the faculties to rescue the students as he brutally disembowelled the Saucer Beast, pulling out its intestines, and some undigested pieces of the MAC Station that Silver Bloome had not finished eating (including Maccy 2 and 3) before finishing it with Spark Ray. With Silver Bloome's death, Leo avenged his fallen friends but it was only the beginning of multiple Biological Saucer invasions. Silver Bloome possessed Tentacle Poison (テンタクルポイズン, Tentakuru Poizun) to grab onto its target before devouring them and emits Dissolution Mist (ディゾリューションミスト, Dizoryūshon Misuto) gas spray, which was said to be its own digestion enzyme.
- Black Doom (ブラックドーム, Burakku Dōmu; 40, 41): (Note: Translated as "Black Dome" in Crunchyroll.) Themed after a Japanese horseshoe crab, Black Doom originated from a black hole as a modified space crab. It was summoned from the Black Star right after Silver Bloome's destruction but its attention was diverted from Commander Black when a saucer enthusiast Ooba attracted it with a mirror, causing the monster to terrorize in the area and injuring Ooba's parents until Gen threw a metal pipe to its pincer. Black Doom retreated and disguised as a fossil dug by researchers of Jonan University, escaping the Biological Laboratory after attacking Izumi Miyama. Realizing that Black Doom was still around, Jounan University was evacuated as it grew large after being discovered by Ooba and Gen. Black Doom try to attack Leo with its Pepsin acid, but the Ultra shrugged off quickly before blocking it with Spark Ray and destroy it altogether with Shooting Beam. Its main ability is to spew acidic Pepsin Bubbles (ペプシン泡, Pepushin Awa) and a giant pincer claw on its right arm.
- Absorva (アブソーバ, Abusōba; 41, 42): (Note: Translated as "Absorba" in Crunchyroll.) A composite of organic substances and lifeforms from Mercury and Venus merged into a jellyfish-like Saucer Creature. It was summoned right after Black Doom's destruction and took refuge in Hideyuki's animal hospital. After striking five oil refineries to feed on the oil supplies, Absorva enlarged when Gen and Tooru ambushed it at Hideyuki's animal hospital, killing its occupants as well. Leo fought against the monster and kill it with Timer Shot. While initially absorbing Hideyuki's energy as a smaller form, the enlarged Absorva can exhale 4,000-degree flame Cosmo Fire (コスモファイヤー, Kosumo Faiyā) and resist normal firepower from combat tanks.
- Demos (デモス, Demosu; 42, 43): An octopoda Saucer Creature from a gaseous nebula. It was summoned right after Absorva's death and split into four Demos Q to kill eight civilians at night. After an incineration attempt by the police officers went awry, all four Demos Q recombines into the gigantic Demos. Leo stop it during an attempt to destroy a tower as he first struck Demos with Spark Ray before dealing the Finisher blow Ultra Shot. In its giant form, Demos secreted Dissolution Foam (溶解泡, Yōkai Awa) that dissolves targets.
  - Demos Q (デモスQ, Demosu Kyū): Four divisions of Demos, one of them is the Master Demos (マスターデモス, Masutā Demosu) that controls all units. They secrete green corrosive bubbles called Bubbler (バブラー, Baburā) and had killed eight victims within one night around the Miyama residential area, by feeding on their blood. Discovering that Demos was trying to force Leo into surrendering himself, Gen left the city until the Master Demos was discovered hiding in the police department. While the Master Demos was about to be incinerated by officers, it merged with three other Demos Q to revert into Demos.
- Black Gallon (ブラックガロン, Burakku Garon; 43, 44): (Note: Translated as "Black Garon" in Crunchyroll.) Themed after turtle, it was a meteorite living in the dust zone of outer space and sent to attack Gen and Tooru at night. When Leo appeared and almost win the fight, Commander Black forced it to retreat as Black Gallon shrunk into a small meteorite which was picked up by a boy to be brought towards a laboratory for further examination. His father ignored Gen's warnings until it was too late as Black Gallon attacked his son until Gen brought them to safety. As Leo, he was choked by the monster's extendable tongue until the former ripped it off, causing Gallon to explode. Black Gallon has the ability to shoot Jet Stream (ジェット火流, Jetto Karyū) sparks and uses its long tongue as a whip-like appendage.
- Blizzard (ブリザード, Burizādo; 44, 45): A decapodiformes Saucer Creature from an ice age alien planet. The blue side emits -100° Freezing Ray (冷凍光線, Reitō Kōsen) while the red side exhales 1,000° Hot Wire (熱線, Nessen). Blizzard sent out a division of herself, Mayuko to assassinate the scientists that researching Black Star before revealing itself after her cover was blown. Blizzard reverted to its saucer form as Leo quickly catch on and destroy it with Hand Beam
  - Mayuko (眉子; 45): A clone/division of Blizzard that took the form a girl holding a French doll, enabling her to spray freezing gas and serves as a communicator to Commander Black. Under his orders, Mayuko was sent to assassinate scientists who studied the Black Star. Once her cover was blown, she summoned and was retrieved by Blizzard. She is portrayed by Kyōko Ikeda (池田 恭子, Ikeda Kyōko).
- Hungler (ハングラー, Hangurā; 45, 46): (Note: Translated as "Hangler" in Crunchyroll.) An Atlantic footballfish-like creature from an inverse galaxy. From the antenna, it acted in a similar way to traffic light in midnight freeway as it feeds on cars for its iron through magnetic force. Junji and his brother Junpei were almost caught by Hungler until they jumped from their truck, but no one except Gen, Tooru and Ayumi believe in their story. Hungler would resurface to feed on the cars before Gen uses an advertising balloon to strike its antenna at the cost of his right arm. After Junpei uses a truck to ram into Hungler, Leo appeared but his injury was carried over from Gen until Astra came to help as he used Ultra Reduction to detonate Hungler from within.
- Black Terrina (ブラックテリナ, Burakku Terina; 46, 47): (Note: Translated as "Black Therina" in Crunchyroll.) A bivalve Saucer Creature which station itself 2,000 meters above Tokyo and spread the Terrina Q shells in order to hunt Gen. Leo fought against Black Terrina while struggling with his injured right eye. After punching its gut, Leo threw Black Terrina to a nearby power station and detonate it.
  - Terrina Q (テリナQ, Terina Kyū; 47): Sakura shells themed smaller divisions of Black Terrina that rained on Tokyo. (Note: In real life, only props of Sakura shells were used since real shells are hard to find in Tokyo suburbs.) Those who picked the shells would end up being killed as they attacked their targets. A young girl named Mariko collected them as good luck charms and even distributed one to the Miyama family. After being assaulted by mind-controlled victims of Terrina Q and even had his right eye injured, Gen reported to the police officers as they recover every available Terrina. By the time Leo destroyed Black Terrina, all Terrina Q were rendered inactive.
- Satanmore (サタンモア, Satanmoa; 47, 48): (Note: Translated as "Satan Mois" in Crunchyroll.) A bird-like Saucer Creature arriving on Earth on March 7, Satanmore made its way to Earth, evading the military forces in Kyushu and attempted to topple a skyscraper which housed Atsuko. While Atsuko managed to make it out, the building collapsed as Leo used Shooting Beam and caused Satanmore to crash on the remains of it. Satanmore is capable of flying at the speed of 3,400 km/h and attacks with flame bullets from its sharp beak and energy rays from its eyes.
  - Strange Bird Saucer Littlemore (怪鳥円盤 リトルモア, Kaichō Enban Ritorumoa; 48): (Note: Name is from Tsuburaya All Monsters Photobook. Other sources stated it as Miniature Strange Birds (小型怪鳥, Kogata Kaichō), Little Strange Birds (小怪鳥, Ko Kaichō) or Miniature Strange Bird Saucer (小型怪鳥円盤, Kogata Kaichō Enban).) Smaller versions of Satanmore that were launched to attack the civilians. Each had sharp beaks to peck their targets with. A flock of them targeted Hiroshi as he lost his life in shielding the baby of his old friend, Atsuko.
- Nova (ノーバ, Nōba; 48, 49): (Note: Translated as "Nouva" in Crunchyroll.) Themed after teru teru bōzu. It has 20,000 red chains underneath its body, armed with a whip on the right tentacle and left tentacle sickle, and emits Violent Gas (狂暴化ガス, Kyōbō-ka Gasu). Once arriving on the Miyama residence, Nova took advantage of Tooru's grief over his deceased family by possessing him and turned several townspeople into rampant. Once Gen purged Tooru from Nova, the Saucer Creature enlarged and faced against Leo by turning the entire area into a red rainstorm but nonetheless became the receiving end of Shooting Beam.
- Alien Bunyo (星人ブニョ, Seijin Bunyo; 50): (Note: In English notation, he is either called as "Alien Bunyo" or "Bunyo the Alien".) An "alien" who offers his service to Commander Black to capture and assassinate Leo. After failing to attack Gen during his training, Bunyo kidnapped Sakiko as a leverage for Gen and brought him to the body processing plant outside the Earth. While transforming into Leo, he was still captured and frozen as Commander Black dissect him into several pieces. Confident with Leo's death, Bunyo was allowed to attack the city unopposed until Ultraman King revived him. Leo quickly used Leo Kick to decapitate Bunyo before it was reduced to a pool of green liquid. Bunyo shoots Jet Flame (ジェット火炎, Jetto Kaen) and Slip Fluid (スリップ液, Surippu-eki). In his human form, Bunyo had a pair of antennae to detect aliens in disguise and used the cosmic energy-made Space Rope (宇宙ロープ, Uchū Rōpu) to tie Leo in his human size, preventing him from enlarging. He was portrayed by Keizō Kanie (蟹江 敬三, Kanie Keizō).
- Black End (ブラックエンド, Burakku Endo; 51): The last and strongest Saucer Creature from Mazelan Nebula (マゼラン星雲, Mazeran Seiun), deployed as a final challenge for Leo. To make things worse, Commander Black held Tooru as his hostage and forced Leo to surrender until several children led by Ayumi attacked the commander as Leo regain advantage in battle. With the Commander Black's crystal ball, Leo used it to kill Black End with a single throw. Black End flew with the speed of 170 km/h and fought using its scissor tail, retractable horns and flames exhaled from its mouth.

=== Jackal ===
Demonic Space Overlord "Demon King Jackal" (宇宙大魔王 ジャッカル大魔王, Uchū Daimaō Jakkaru Daimaō) is the antagonist of 1975 manga, The Ultraman, illustrated by Mamoru Uchiyama.

The leader of the eponymous Jackal Army (ジャッカル軍団, Jakkaru Gundan), Jackal was banished into the black hole by Ultraman King for his crimes against the universe. Unfortunately, the black hole itself empowers Jackal long enough for him to escape and lead his army in an attempted genocide against the Ultra Warriors, forcing the survivors to take refuge on Earth. On Earth, members of the Jackal Army try to force Zoffy into surrendering himself, but the recent arrival of Melos turn the tides of the battle and lead the surviving Ultras into storming Planet Jackal and attacked their leader. The Demon King Jackal managed to defeat Melos by feigning surrender but Zoffy dons the Cosmo Tector to mislead the Jackal Army, allowing Mother of Ultra to revive the fallen Ultra Brothers and obliterate the Demon King. With peace returning to the universe, the surviving Jackal Army ceased fighting and surrender themselves.

The Demon King Jackal is capable of assuming various forms to assassinate the Ultra Warriors; Zetton in against Ultraman, Alien Nackle and Black King against Returned Ultraman, Ace Killer against Ace, Birdon against Taro and Zoffy against the Leo Brothers.

As with all male characters, Demon King Jackal is voiced by Koichi Yamadera when The Ultraman was adapted into a 2015 short animation.
