= List of Ultraman: Towards the Future characters =

This is the character page for 1992 tokusatsu Ultra Series Ultraman: Towards the Future. The series receive its Japanese dub and airing in Japan in 1995.

== UMA ==
Universal Multipurpose Agency, or shortened as UMA is an international military organization formed to combat unusual phenomena. The main headquarters in the America, while the other branches in Siberia, the Sea of Japan, India, South Africa, England, Central America and Australia. The South Pacific Branch is located on an island off the coast and is staffed by approximately 50 people. Their operations are occasionally joined by the Australian army make several appearances.

Members

Regular personnel wears UMA Uniforms, UMA Helmet and a wrist communicator. They are also armed with UMA Gun a handguns for combat, Black Launcher for heavier firepower and wear protective suits when entering specified areas.

- Captain Arthur Grant: Captain of the UMA South Pacific Branch, who also went into the missions alongside his team members. He is portrayed by Ralph Cotterill and voiced by Akiji Kobayashi (小林昭二, Kobayashi Akiji) in Japanese dub, whose previously known for his role as Captain Muramatsu in Ultraman.
- Jack Shindo: The main protagonist who encounters monster Gudis on Mars. But Gudis killed his friend Stanley Haggard. Jack bonded with Ultraman Great after the latter's pursuit of Gudis to Earth. To transform, Jack uses the Delta Plasma (デルタ・プラズマー, Deruta Purazumā) that is provided by Great. Later, he joined UMA, in order to help them battle the monsters. He is portrayed by Dore Kraus and voiced by Masaki Kyomoto (京本 政樹, Kyōmoto Masaki) in the Japanese dub.
- Charles Morgan: The brains of UMA, archeology, biology and analysis. He is portrayed by Lloyd Morris and voiced by Shingo Yanagisawa (柳沢 慎吾, Yanagisawa Shingo) in Japanese dub.
- Jean Echo: The former engineer of Space Development Authority and also Jack's love interest. In episode 1, she designed a NASA spacecraft that allows Jack and Stanley go on Mars exploration, she examine the tape from the incident on Mars. She discovered that the two astronauts mysteriously disappeared. Later, She is surprised to see Jack had returned from Mar. In episode 5, she was kidnaped by Stanley. He takes her to a construction area where there are several pits full of green Gudis goos. Jack shows up and after some tricky negotiating, Jack hands over the Delta Plasma. Stanley throws Jean into the pit and turns into Barangas. Jack gets the Delta Plasma and transform into Great. Great defeated Barangas. But she was infected by Gudis cells, Jean is carried away to medical center at UMA headquarters. (Note: In Japanese dub version, mentioned it as Goudes revival.) In episode 6, Super Gudis resurrected and was destroyed by Great, she survived from the volcano. She is portrayed by Gia Carides and voiced by Yoshiko Sakakibara (榊原 良子, Sakakibara Yoshiko) in Japanese dub.
- Lloyd Wilder: Deputy Captain of UMA South Pacific branch. Experts in professional military training. He is portrayed by Rick Adams III and voiced by Kōichi Yamadera (山寺 宏一, Yamadera Kōichi) in Japanese dub.
- Kim Shaomin: The ace pilot of the team, who is also an expert in handling Hummer. She is portrayed by Grace Parr and voiced by Fumi Hirano (平野 文, Hirano Fumi) in Japanese dub.

Mechas and vehicles

- Hummer: A high performance hover jet fighter, it is armed with the Excima laser cannons and missiles.
- Saltops: There are two types of high-speed vehicles.
  - Saltops #1: A Mitsubishi Galant patrol car for routine patrol.
  - Saltops #2: A Mitsubishi Pajero attack vehicle used for a ground combat, equipped with Pulse Cannon (Note: It was known as "Tulsar Cannon" in original english version.) on the roof.

== Australian Army ==
Australian Army is a military organization occasionally support UMA and battle against the monster.

- Lieutenant Brewster: Australian Army General. First appear in episode 6. He is portrayed by Peter Raymond Powell and voiced by Shōzō Iizuka (飯塚 昭三, Iizuka Shōzō) in Japanese dub.
- Ike: Australian Army Information Division Chief. First appear in episode 2. He is portrayed by David Grybowski and voiced by Kazuhiko Kishino (岸野一彦, Kishino Kazuhiko) in Japanese dub.

== Ultraman Great ==
Ultraman Great (ウルトラマンG（グレート）, Urutoraman Gurēto) is the titular hero, who is simply called as the "Ultraman" in-series. Hailing from Nebula M78 of the Land of Light, Great chased the Gudis to Earth, where it plans on corrupting all life, mutating other creatures into monsters and awakening existing ones.

During the Mars exploration, two astronauts are Jack Shindo and Stanley Haggard had encounters monster Gudis. But Gudis killed Stanley Haggard while tries to escape in their ship but it is blown up. After Gudis was defeated by Ultraman Great but Gudis metamorphoses into a virus and travels to Earth, Jack able to return to Earth after merging with Great and transforms into him using the Delta Plasma. Later, Jack transforms into Great and battle against the Bogun in Australia. Since his body condition cannot adapt to Earth surroundings, he is forced to bond with Jack Shindo. A serious problem for Ultraman Great is that he can only last for three minutes in his natural state on Earth. If two minutes elapsed during a fight with a monster, Great's power jewel changed from green to a flashing white color to warn him time was running out.

In episode 6 Super Gudis reappears, more powerful than before. It imprisons Great, but Jack distracts it by ultimately showing it the futility of its mission. Even if it does manage to corrupt all life, eventually there will be nothing else to corrupt. The distraction allows Great to break free and destroy Super Gudis once and for all. For the rest of the series the environmental themes are stronger and the monsters usually arise from human pollution.

In the final episode, a doomsday scenario begins with the appearance of two powerful monsters are Kilazee and Kudara, which tries to wipe out the human race for abusing it. Great is defeated by Kudara, but Jack survives. Ultimately UMA use an ancient disc to destroy Kudara by reflecting its own power at it, Great defeats Kilazee and carries it into space, separating Jack from him and restoring him on Earth as a normal human. The victory is seen as another chance for the human race. He is voiced by Matthew O'Sullivan in English and Masaaki Okabe (岡部 政明, Okabe Masaaki) in Japanese dub.

Ultraman Great's costume different from the previous Ultramen, with the color timer is a triangle and the body color is white and red. Great's spandex suit was created by Kiyoshi Suzuki (鈴木 清, Suzuki Kiyoshi) the producer and also a photographer, and instead of a traditional rubber suit, so that the "actor could move in it" and "reduce the risk of heat exhaustion" however, the suit actor passed out one day in the spandex suit.

Delta Plasma (デルタ・プラズマー, Deruta Purazumā) is a Color Timer-shaped pendant that Jack Shindo wears and uses to transform into Ultraman Great. Jack gingerly places it in his palm, closes his eyes, emits weird pulsating synthesizer noises and emerges as Great from amidst fireworks.

His main finishers moves are Burning Plasma (バーニングプラズマ, Bāningu Purazuma) and Magnum Shoot (マグナムシュート, Magunamu Shūto). He can also perform beam finishers, such as Knuckle Shooter (ナックルシューター, Nakkuru Shūtā), Great Slicer (グレートスライサー, Gurēto Suraisā) is an energy sword with a variation of Double Great Slicer (ダブルグレートスライサー, Daburu Gurēto Suraisā), Dissolver (ディゾルバー, Dizorubā) is an atomic disruptor can dissolve monster's corpse, Finger Beam (フィンガービーム, Fingā Bīmu) a needle laser fired from the index of middle fingers with a variation of Double Finger Beam (ダブルフィンガービーム, Daburu Fingā Bīmu), Disk Beam (ディスクビーム, Disuku Bīmu), Palm Shooter (パームシューター, Pāmu Shūtā), Star Beam (スタービーム, Sutā Bīmu) and Arrow Beam (アロービーム, Arō Bīmu). The others normal moves are Triangle Shield (トライアングルシールド, Toraianguru Shīrudo) a triangle barrier, Great Punch (グレートパンチ, Gurēto Panchi), Great Chop (グレートチョップ, Gurēto Choppu) and Great Kick (グレートキック, Gurēto Kikku)

== Monsters ==
- Evil Life Form Goudes (邪悪生命体 ゴーデス, Jaaku Seimeitai Gōdesu; 1): Named Gudis in the original English version, it's an evil that seeks to assimilate all life in the universe. Gudis' true form is a retrovirus. Attaches cells to other living creatures and turns them into monsters. It was defeated by Great's Burning Plasma, but Gudis sent a virus to Earth.
  - Evil Life Form Goudes (Powered Up) (邪悪生命体 ゴーデス（強化）, Jaaku Seimeitai Godesu (Kyohka); 6): Named Super Gudis in the original English version, the resurrected evil form of Gudis cells reunite and absorb other life forms. More powerful than the original form. Able to absorb Great into its body using telepathy. But Great managed to break free and destroy Super Gudis.
- Two-Brained Ground-Beast Broads (双脳地獣 ブローズ, Sohnoh Chi-Juh Buohzu; 1): Named Bogun in the original English version, it has two brains. Fires an immobilizing beam. Used the tentacle on top head as a whip. Can trap enemies in capsules. It was destroyed by Great's Burning Plasma. (Note: Bogun was based from Twin Tail of The Return of Ultraman.) (Note: In episode 2 of “SSSS.GRIDMAN”, Bogun appeared as a modal figure in display shelf of Akane Shinjō's room.)
- Ancient Monster Guigasaurus (古代怪獣 ギガザウルス, Kodai Kaiju Gigazaurusu; 2): Named Gigasaurus in the original English version, the ancient dinosaur Apatosaurus discovered in Antarctica. (Note: GUIGASAURUS was mentioned in "Ultraman Pictorial 2".) Able to resist infection of Gudis virus. Emits an icy gas from mouth and can drop the surrounding temperature. It was defeated by Great's Magnum Shoot and then Dissolver. (Note: In episode 2 of “SSSS.GRIDMAN”, Gigasaurus appeared as a modal figure in display shelf of Akane Shinjō's room.)
- Flame Fire-Dragon Gerukadon (火炎飛龍 ゲルカドン, Kaen Hi-Ryu Gerukadon; 3): The memory of a fossilized reptile and the bitter thoughts of a Jimmy combined with Gudis virus. Laser from eyes and flame from mouth. It was defeated by Great's Magnum Shoot. Gerukadon takes Jimmy into the sky. (Note: In episode 2 of “SSSS.GRIDMAN”, Gerukadon appeared as a modal figure in display shelf of Akane Shinjō's room.)
- Malevolent Wind Deity Deganja (風魔神 デガンジャ, Fuh-Majin Deganja; 4): Named Degunja in the original English version, Wind God was infected by Gudis virus. Controls winds and fires bolts of electricity from hands. It was destroyed by Great's Magnum Shoot. (Note: Degunja was based on a Tasmanian devil.)
- Poison Gas Vision Monster Barangas (毒ガス幻影怪獣 バランガス, Doku-Gasu Genei Kaiju Barangasu; 5): Originally the astronaut named Stanley Haggard, who was killed by Gudis and infected by the Gudis virus during his exploration to Mars with Jack Shindo, transforming him into a Barangas. Poisonous red gas from wings. Uses teleportation into different location. Strong but slow move. It was destroyed by Great's Arrow Beam. (Note: In episode 2 of “SSSS.GRIDMAN”, Barangas appeared as a modal figure in display shelf of Akane Shinjō's room.)
- Protection-Beast Gazebo (守護獣 ガゼボ, Shugo-Juh Gazebo; 7): Awakened and rampages because of environmental degradation. Strong and fast, and also uses the body slams as a main attack. Likes to eat metals. Great managed to pushed Gazebo into a cave and sealed it with a rockslide.
- Insect Monster Majaba (昆虫怪獣 マジャバ, Konchuh Kaiju Majaba; 8): A locust that transforms into a monster because of pesticides. Poison gas from mouth. Feeds on insecticides. Female and male versions are practically identical. It was destroyed by Great's Great Slicer and he used Star Beam to destroy Majaba's nest. Charles released a gooey chemical and killed Majaba. Great used Dissolver to dissolve Majaba's body. (Note: In episode 2 of “SSSS.GRIDMAN”, Majaba appeared as a modal figure in display shelf of Akane Shinjō's room. In episode 9, Akane mentioned it that Majaba is a female.)
- Electric-Brained Plant BIOS (電脳植物バイオス, Denō Shokubutsu BAIOSU; 9): The giant form of a space plant that takes over a computer and plots to destroy all life on Earth. Electric beam from eyes. It was destroyed by Great's Double Finger Beam. (Note: In episode 8 of “SSSS.GRIDMAN”, BIOS appeared as a modal figure in display shelf of Akane Shinjō's room.)
- Transformation Life Form Rugulo (変身生命体 リュグロー, Henshin Seimeitai Rugulo; 10): Named Rugalo in the original English version, a space tourist who comes to Earth with no malevolent intentions, but has a horrible jealous streak. Can transform into anything, and fires lasers from his blade-like horn and claws. During the battle, Great explain to Rugalo about his problems and realizing his mistake soon turns back into his human form. He and Veronica flew into space. He is voiced by Nakata Kazuhiro (中多 和宏, Nakata Kazuhiro) in Japanese dub.
- Transformation Life Form Veronica (変身生命体 ベロニカ, Henshin Seimeitai Beronika; 10): Rugalo's wife and space travel companion. She is portrayed by Oriana Panozzo and voiced by Keiko Han (潘 恵子, Han Keiko) in the Japanese dub.
- Flying-Saucer Life Form UF-0 (円盤生物 UF-0, Enban Seibutsu UF-0; 11): A mysterious life form that disguises itself into a flying saucer. Binding rays from claws. It was defeated by Great's Magnum Shoot and flew into space. (Note: UF-0 was based on a various Flying-Saucer Life Form of Ultraman Leo.)
- Legendary Deep-Sea Monster Kodalar (伝説深海怪獣 コダラー, Densetsu Shinkai Kaiju Kodarā; 12, 13): Named Kudara in the original English version, a monster of the legend, said to bring about ruin. Fires a lasers from eyes. Able to repels Great's laser weapons. Kudara managed to defeated Great and retreated back to the sea. Later, Kudara was distracted by UMA's laser weapon blasting at Kudara, while tried to repels the attack until it was destroyed.
- Legendary Space Monster Shiralie (伝説宇宙怪獣 シラリー, Densetsu Uchu Kaiju Shirarī; 12, 13): Named Kilazee in the original English version, who arrives on Earth from space folling the appearance of Kudara. Flame from mouth and lasers from arms. It was defeated by Great's Double Great Slicer and Knuckle Shooter. Great carries Kilazee into space and separated Jack. (Note: In episode 2 of “SSSS.GRIDMAN”, Shiralie appeared as a modal figure in display shelf of Akane Shinjō's room.)
