= List of Ultraman X episodes =

This is a list of episodes of the 2015 Ultra Series Ultraman X.

== Episodes ==
No.	Title	Written by	Original release date
1	"Voice from the Starry Sky"; Transliteration: "Hoshizora no Koe" (Japanese: 星空の声)	Yūji Kobayashi	July 14, 2015
In outer space, two extraterrestrial beings clashed against each other when one of them, the red figure, banishes his opponent, a purple figure, into the Sun. But this creates the Ultra Flare, which awakens Spark Dolls on Earth and causes them to run amok across the world. Due to this, nations worldwide founded the Xio group. Fifteen years later, after a failed attempt by a Xio lab team to materialize Cyber Gomora, one of them, Daichi hears a voice from space. Soon, the monster Demaaga appears and rampages in Umezawa City. While Daichi and Asuna manage to evacuate the citizens, he realizes that he has dropped his Gomora Spark Doll. He tries to retrieve it, but becomes an open target for Demaaga's attack. Fortunately, a red giant fuses with Daichi and they fight and seal Demaaga in his Spark Doll. Daichi reunites with his teammates and reveals the red giant's name as Ultraman X.
2	"A Collection of Possibilities"; Transliteration: "Kanōsei no Katamari" (Japanese: 可能性のかたまり)	Hirotoshi Kobayashi	July 21, 2015
After several middle school students take a tour inside the Operation Base X, Daichi learns of Ultraman X's past being trapped in the form of computer data and swears to help him return to his physical body. The next day at Okumayama, a pregnant Birdon tries to build a nest for her eggs but several civilians are being held captive by her actions. Xio launches a rescue operation by luring her away from her nest. Daichi transforms into Ultraman X and tries to attack her but falls under her poisonous attacks. Dr. Gourman creates new programming for Cyber Gomora and Ultraman X to combine, thus giving Ultraman X access to Gomora Armor. After defeating Birdon, the captives are rescued and Daichi assures that one day, Birdon will be released when humans will finally be able to live peacefully with monsters.
3	"A Song That Calls the Night"; Transliteration: "Yoru o Yobu Uta" (Japanese: 夜を呼ぶ歌)	Takao Nakano	July 28, 2015
A series of earthquakes are reported at Area T-7B. As Asuna and Daichi investigate in the subway, they meet a strange woman. She summons Telesdon until Daichi and Asuna manage to scare it off. In order to investigate what happened, the two are sent to investigate the strange woman, and Asuna reveals that the woman from that night, Ryoko Mabuse, was supposed to have died two months ago in an accident. Upon revealing her as a fake, the two chase her but she escapes, again. As the night comes, she summons Telesdon to attack Area T-7B, again, until Ultraman X and Xio members Wataru and Hayato fight it. Upon receiving the Cyber Eleking card, Daichi and Ultraman X try using Eleking Armor and successfully destroy Telesdon. While Xio members regroup with an injured Asuna, "Ryoko" tries to attack them, but disappears mysteriously out of sight.
4	"All for One"; Transliteration: "Ōru Fō Wan" (Japanese: オール・フォー・ワン)	Hisako Kurosawa	August 4, 2015
Hayato and Wataru's rivalry for each other turns from bad to worse over time. During their lunch break, Alien Zarab reveals himself and launches Bemstar to wreak havoc in the city as Earth becomes his new target. Xio members deploy and Asuna attacks Bemstar, Daichi scans the monster, and Wataru and Hayato track down Zarab. During the mission, Daichi is seemingly killed after being hit by Bemstar's attack, but he actually has survived and turns into Ultraman X to attack the monsters. Wataru and Hayato finally pinpoint Alien Zarab's location, but their arguing allows him to escape, again. Bemstar absorbs Ultraman X into his stomach and flies away to the moon. Driven by guilt after their lack of teamwork has allowed Zarab to escape and Daichi to be "killed", Asuna, Hayato, and Wataru over their actions and decide to correct their mistake. After successfully destroying Alien Zarab, Wataru and Hayato are sent to the moon where they free Ultraman X from Bemstar who later defeats the monster, allowing Daichi to return to normal and reunite with his teammates.
5	"When the Aegis Shines"; Transliteration: "Ījisu Hikaru Toki" (Japanese: イージス 光る時)	Takao Nakano	August 11, 2015
While Xio members are on their way to a test site to turn monsters into Spark Dolls, Black King attacks them while Alien Nackle Bandero tries to steal the Spark Dolls. Ultraman X appears but is weakened by both the monster and alien until Ultraman Zero appears to assist Ultraman X. Bandero gets away and takes the Spark Dolls with him, while also unintentionally taking Rui along for the ride. With Rui on Planet Guillermo, Xio invents the Ultimate Zero Card, while Ultraman Zero talks to Ultraman X and insists that he will save Rui. With the card completed, Daichi as Ultraman X uses it to get to Planet Guillermo, where he joins Ultraman Zero in battling Bandero and Black King Drill Custom. After the battle ended, Rui takes a photo with the two Ultramen and Ultraman Zero bids farewell to Ultraman X, who hopes that they will meet again some other time. (Note: Planet Guillermo (惑星ギレルモ, Wakusei Girerumo) was named after film director Guillermo del Toro, who is also a fan of Japanese culture. Upon discovering this on Twitter, he felt honored.)
6	"The Man With the Memories of a Planet"; Transliteration: "Hoshi no Kioku o Motsu Otoko" (Japanese: 星の記憶を持つ男)	Hirotoshi Kobayashi	August 18, 2015
A young stranger, whom appears to be an Alien Gold has been sighted wandering around a park by two schoolgirls, with one of them was rescued by him from several bullies sometime ago. The alien was tormented by several youngsters and tries to activate Rudian, provoking Xio to take action. Daichi realizes that Alien Gold has no malicious intent, having healed a schoolgirl earlier. The alien tries to search for his lost ship but accidentally faints when piloting, causing Rudian to wreak havoc in the city. Ultraman X and Sky Musketty put a stop on it and the Alien Gold manages to regain consciousness to deactivate the robot before fainting again. While Alien Gold is under custody, Chief Minamikawa from UNVER Japan Branch wants the alien dead, believing him as a threat. Alien Gold awakens and reveal what happened: back in his past, his home planet was under attacked by Gargorgon, a similar monster that destroyed a civilization in the human history. That monster will arrive on Earth for the Planet Gold energy in Rudian and he must use the robot to stop him. Soon Gargorgon appears and Minamikawa orders Gold to be surrendered but halted by Captain Kamiki. Knowing Daichi's relation to Ultraman X, Gold seek their help and the two agree, as both Ultra and robot face the arrival of Gargorgon. Before the battle, Alien Gold introduces his name as tE-rU and thanks Daichi and X for their support.
7	"An Oath Beyond Stars"; Transliteration: "Hoshi o Koeta Chikai" (Japanese: 星を越えた誓い)	Yūji Kobayashi	August 25, 2015
As Xio, Ultraman X and Rudian fight Gargorgon, the monster attacks Rudian but X sacrifices himself to protect him and tE-rU, thus the Ultra was petrified. On space, Gargorgon demanded Earth to surrender tE-rU in 44 minutes or else all lifeforms will be petrified. All nationwide branches of Xio launch several missiles, only to be destroyed easily. tE-rU provides his aid to Xio and they work on a plan to attack Gargorgon's main eye to restore X. Eventually, as it seems that tE-rU would nearly costs his own life, Xio members manage to destroy said organ, saving the Ultra, tE-rU and Rudian. Equipped with the Bemstar Armor, X redirects Gargorgon's attack, petrifying her and for Rudian to kill the destroyer. As Xio member celebrates, tE-rU reconciles with Yuuki, the schoolgirl from earlier and gives her his pendant before returning to his homeland. Daichi swears that one day, Earth and Planet Gold will be united in spirit.
R1	"Encounters and Friends"; Transliteration: "Deai Soshite Nakama-tachi" (Japanese: 出会い そして仲間たち)	Ryo Ikeda	September 1, 2015
A short recap of episode 1 until 7 of Ultraman X.
8	"X in Peril"; Transliteration: "Nerawareta Ekkusu" (Japanese: 狙われたX)	Sotaro Hayashi	September 8, 2015
After Ultraman X and Xio were unable to defeat Zetton, Dr. Kaito Touma visits them and gives them a Zetton Spark Doll to help with the creation of a new armor. As X used it in the battle, however it rendered him immobile as another Touma Kaito appears and unmasks the impostor as Alien Sran Quila, whom tried to turn X into his puppet. Ultraman Max appears as he tried to battle Zetton and free X but overpowered by them, followed by Quila's participation until Daichi used the Cyber Eleking to destroy the Zetton Armor's virus, allowing him to aid Max in time. After the battle ended, Kaito reveals to Daichi and X that he is actually an Ultraman in disguise of his former partner and gives them a Cyber Card before leaving.
9	"We Are Nebula!"; Transliteration: "Ware-ra Seiun!" (Japanese: 我ら星雲！)	Takao Nakano	September 15, 2015
After a humiliating defeat, Isamu (the younger brother of Wataru Kazama) quits rugby and stumbles upon the Nebula House, a rent house, where its residents invited him as their newest housemate/co-tenant. Isamu soon learns that they are aliens in disguise, but decided not to further report at Xio, witnessing them not as a threat. However, when Halky's Samekujira, Jolly appeared to reunite with its master, this attracts the attention of a crime network, Dark Star Cluster. The Nebula House residents challenged them in a rugby match over Jolly's ownership. The house resident wins thanks to Isamu's coaching since the past three days and his renewed spirit but the Dark Star Cluster enlarge and rampages after being unable to accept defeat before being sent back to space by Ultraman X. In the end, Isamu rejoins his rugby team as the next championship takes place in London, England.
10	"The Monster Won't Move"; Transliteration: "Kaijū wa Ugokanai" (Japanese: 怪獣は動かない)	Sachio Yanai	September 22, 2015
The peaceful monster Houlinga appears and becomes the Sakane village's centerpiece in tourism. One month later, the mayor requests Xio to cure the monster after it was found suffering from malnutrition but as they injected it with a cure, the monster rampages. A little girl name Hana reveals that Houlinga was supposedly to die on the village and becomes a mountain at the end of its life cycle. When Xio members attempt to relocate Houlinga, the monster continues to rampage and sprays pollens until Ultraman X quarantine it and remove the drug launched by Xio, allowing the monster to peacefully end its life cycle.
11	"An Unknown Friend"; Transliteration: "Michi-naru Yūjin" (Japanese: 未知なる友人)	Yūji Kobayashi	September 29, 2015
After 27 failed attempts to materialize Cyber Gomora, Daichi tries to find the error of his ways, eventually pushing himself too hard and almost endangering his health condition which made his comrades worried. An Alien Pedan invader sent their King Joe to attack Earth as their recent target. Even with Ultraman X and Zetton Armor proves powerless against the invading robot until Daichi/X's attempt to shield Asuna awakens Gomora, whom reveals that its failure to materialize was due to its refusal to cooperate, worrying over Daichi. Reassured by him, Cyber Gomora finally materializes, weakening King Joe before X uses Ultraman Max's Max Galaxy and deliberate the robot.
12	"End of the Rainbow"; Transliteration: "Niji no Yuku Saki" (Japanese: 虹の行く先)	Hiroki Uchida	October 6, 2015
Another breed of Demaaga was awakened and attacked Umezawa City, the same spot its previous brethren went to. Ultraman X tried to attack the monster but a strange Dark Thunder Energy struck them as Demaaga transformed into Tsurugi Demaaga and pummels X into submission. To ensure Daichi's safety, X disunites with him, which ended up with the Ultra lost in Cyber World. As Asuna and the Lab Team investigates Demaaga's awakening spot, a female warrior, whom responsible for awakening Demaaga fights Asuna while Xio members attacked Tsurugi Demaaga in X's place. With Gourman's help, Daichi dwells into the Cyber World, where he gains a new weapon and reunites with X, allowing them to return and fight Tsurugi Demaaga as Ultraman Exceed X, using this new power to vanquish the Dark Thunder Energy before defeating it with Xanadium Ray. Meanwhile, the female warrior summons Zaragas and Asuna uses Cyber Gomora to fight it, ultimately winning the fight but gives the female warrior an opening to escape. Sometime later, the female warrior, Gina Spectre, recruits two new members of the Gua Army, Alien Magma and Alien Shaplay as their time grows short.
13	"Sword of Victory"; Transliteration: "Shōri no Tsurugi" (Japanese: 勝利の剣)	Akio Miyoshi	October 13, 2015
Mold Spectre kidnaps Show/Ultraman Victory and Arisa (accidentally) to Ultraman X's world as Gua Army's prisoner due to being the murderer of his brother, Juda Spectre. Fortunately, thanks to Arisa, she managed to gain help in the form of UPG, as well as Ultraman X with Show escaped custody and reunited with her. Seeing Daichi's poor swordsmanship, he trained the boy and finally approved his effort. With the Gua Army planning to harvest the Dark Thunder Energy to strengthen their group, Xio, UPG and the Ultramen attacked them, with Exceed X and Victory Knight managed to overpower Mold Spectre and kills Alien Magma. Ultraman Ginga appears to join the fight, having killed the arriving Gua Army's remaining armada.
14	"The Shining Sky, and the Land Beneath It"; Transliteration: "Hikaru Ōzora Tsunagaru Daichi" (Japanese: 光る大空・繋がる大地)	Sotaro Hayashi	October 20, 2015
With Ginga assisting the Ultramen, Gua Army was forced to retreat and their space distortion was sealed. Hikaru, Ginga's host introduced himself to Xio and Daichi as well as telling the boy of several peaceful monsters which made his dream to befriend monsters even closer. Soon, Gina released Mecha Gomora and lured Xio and UPG members away from their base for Mold to attack and awaken the Spark Dolls. While Gomora had been taken cared by Cyber Gomora, Shaplay loses his life when shielding Gina and she fused with Mold and Juda's spirit to become Gua Spectre. The three Ultramen arrives and fight the alien colossal, with Ginga and Victory used their fusion and Exceed X expels the Dark Thunder Energy before finishing Gua altogether. With the Gua Army disbanded, Ultraman X used the Ultimate Zero Armor to transport the UPG members back to their world.
R2	"The Light of Victory Which Exceeds All Limites"; Transliteration: "Genkai o Koeta Shōri no Hikari" (Japanese: 限界を超えた勝利の光)	Junichiro Ashiki	October 27, 2015
A short recap of episodes 8 until 14. It also supplies with the scenes from Ultraman Ginga S: Showdown! Ultra 10 Warriors!! and Ultra Fight Victory.
15	"A Soldier's Back"; Transliteration: "Senshi no Senaka" (Japanese: 戦士の背中)	Hisako Kurosawa	November 3, 2015
Gomess had been sighted to attack two times, first at the countryside and second at a city. Captain Shotaro Kamiki receives an invitation letter to his daughter's wedding but hesitate to come along due to Gomess' attack and the fact that he had been separated from his daughter for years. Xio members decide to give him a day off until Gomess came in contact with the strange Dark Thunder Energy, which turn the monster more powerful and violent. Even with Ultraman X's assistant, Xio had no match for this monster until Captain Kamiki used Cyber Gomora and together with X, defeating the monster. Kamiki arrives late to his daughter's wedding but she stayed behind even after the ceremony ended and together re-enact her entrance to the wedding.
16	"Feature Report! 24 Hours Inside Xio"; Transliteration: "Gekisatsu! Xio Mitchaku Nijū-yo-ji" (Japanese: 激撮！Xio密着24時)	Takao Nakano	November 10, 2015
A special television program was held to monitor Xio's action for a day with the filming crew take a stroll around their base and interviewing the members. An alien was sighted by a college student and Xio members manage to capture the perpetrator. The criminal, a Kemur Man confessed that he worked for a secret crime network bend on kidnapping female women. After Xio manages to storm in to the group's hideout and rescue their captives, the crime network's leader, Dada, revealed that his reason for kidnapping young women was for cloning, since he predicted that frequent sightings of the Dark Thunder Energy would result in humanity's extinction on Earth. In the same day, the Dark Thunder Energy strikes Gubila, sending the monster in a rampaging spree until it was stopped and purified by Exceed X. The next day, with the documentary ended, Xio members frustrated on each others' performances during the filming. Sayuri however is an exception, as her daughters commended their mother for being on television.
17	"My Friend's a Monster"; Transliteration: "Tomodachi wa Kaijū" (Japanese: ともだちは怪獣)	Kyoko Katsuya	November 17, 2015
A newly moved little girl named Sakura befriends Pigmon, a small monster that had been dubbed as a ghost by several villagers and had played with children over the past years. While Sakura and her friends are at the shopping complex, Pigmon appears to warn everyone of the Dark Thunder Energy but the civilians mistook Pigmon for a hostile monster, catching it until Xio arrives and the Dark Thunder Energy summons King Guesra. King Guesra was purified and defeated by Ultraman X, turning into Spark Doll but Pigmon seemingly died after saving a man from a falling rubble. The next day, Pigmon was revealed to have survived and nurse back to health by Xio members before releasing it to Sakura.
18	"Wataru's Romance"; Transliteration: "Wataru no Koi" (Japanese: ワタルの恋)	Hisako Kurosawa	November 24, 2015
Wataru grows jealous when his childhood crush tends to hang out with Hayato. During his rugby match, Mu appears and searching for something in the city, accidentally causes damages and summon Red King due to its connection to the Dark Thunder Energy. Red King mutates into EX Red King from the same energy until X purifies it but while dealing with an infatuated Mu, X seems to not recognize it until the former sheds tears, allowing X to remember her but instead, Mu loses her memory and infatuation for X. After that incident, Wataru finally manages to overcome his jealousy for Hayato.
19	"Living Together"; Transliteration: "Tomo ni Ikiru" (Japanese: 共に生きる)	Uiko Miura	December 1, 2015
Daichi's Gomora has finally brought to life in Xio's experiment but as all test on Gomora has passed, the Dark Thunder Energy mutated Gomora into EX Gomora, sending it on a rampaging spree. X tried to stop it but was kidnapped by M1, whom deemed that humanity and monsters cannot coexist. Eventually, Asuna's effort to peacefully stop Gomora prompted M1 to change his mindset and released X to purify the monster. In the end, M1 decided to observe the Earth again, having faith in humanity.
20	"Bond -Unite-"; Transliteration: "Kizuna -Yunaito-" (Japanese: 絆 -Unite-)	Hirotoshi Kobayashi	December 8, 2015
Several Bugbuzun Broods were detected by Xio officers as they rushed into the scene and eliminate the monsters. When one of them was about to attack a civilian and a weakened Sayuri, she found herself transformed into Ultraman Nexus and rescue the civilian before saving her family in Canada from Bemular. However, she becomes fearful of this and temporarily resigned from her position until the enlarged Bugbuzun Brood appears and overpowers X, prompting her to fight as Nexus again. In the end, Nexus ceased her bond with him and tells Daichi not to give up on his dreams as he leaves the boy his Cyber Card. Meanwhile, an extraterrestrial message that Daichi received prior was finally deciphered, revealing the sender from his mother, whom seeks his help.
21	"A Beautiful End"; Transliteration: "Utsukushiki Shūen" (Japanese: 美しき終焉)	Hirotoshi Kobayashi	December 15, 2015
The mastermind behind the Ultra Flare, Greeza, finally appears and absorbs the Spark Doll storage facility in UNVER Nevada branch. Setting its sight on Xio's Operation Base X, Ultraman X made himself known to Xio members and cooperates with them to defend the Spark Dolls. Daichi reveals his true identity to everyone and with Ultraman X, proceed to join Xio and attack Greeza. However in his last strength, Exceed X seemingly self destructs to destroy Greeza after being absorbed, leaving his Color Timer intact.
22	"The Rainbow Land"; Transliteration: "Niji no Daichi" (Japanese: 虹の大地)	Yūji Kobayashi	December 22, 2015
As it seems that X died from killing Greeza, Asuna heard Daichi's heartbeat in X's Color Timer and tried to enter the cyberspace in order to search for him. Meanwhile, Greeza appeared to have survived his destruction and battled Cyber Gomora (Hayato) before stealing Xio's Spark Dolls, allowing it to achieve its final form. As Greeza was about to kill Xio members, Wataru and Mamoru dashed into the scene and protect them by launching Xio Musketty before Asuna brought Daichi and X back to the real world. While battling Greeza, Gomora heard of Daichi's plea and with all captured Spark Dolls, escaped as they merged with Ultraman X with their Cyber Cards to form Hybrid Armor. With his newfound power, X kills Greeza, saving the Earth from its impending doom. After a brief reunion with his parents, Daichi returned to his friends, now accepting X into the team.
R3	"A World United as One"; Transliteration: "Kizuna de Hitotsu ni Naru Sekai" (Japanese: 絆でひとつになる世界)	Junichiro Ashiki	January 5, 2016
A short recap of episodes 15 until 22. It also supplies with the scenes of Ultraman X The Movie. Note: This is the only episode to never be available for streaming in the United States legally.
