= Ultra Zero Fight =

Japanese tokusatsu television miniseries

- DVD Cover
- Created by: Tsuburaya Productions
- Written by: Yuji Kobayashi; Junichiro Ashiki
- Directed by: Hideki Oka; Yuichi Abe
- Voices of: Mamoru Miyano; Tomokazu Seki; Hikaru Midorikawa; Hiroshi Kamiya; Miyu Irino
- Country of origin: Japan
- No. of episodes: 8 (Part 1); 15 (Part 2)

Production
- Running time: 3–4 minutes

Original release
- Network: TV Tokyo
- Release: August 1, 2012 – March 27, 2013

Related
- Ultra Fight Victory

Ultra Zero Fight (ウルトラゼロファイト, Urutora Zero Faito) is a Japanese tokusatsu television miniseries produced by Tsuburaya Productions that was aired during the final segment of the Ultraman Retsuden programming block on TV Tokyo and the 8th entry in the Ultra Fight series. The series was made and released following the success of the 2012 Ultra Series movie, Ultraman Saga, and is a tribute to the low-budget series, Ultra Fight. The miniseries is divided into two seasons, A New Power (新たなる力, Arata naru Chikara), which consists of 8 episodes from August 1 to September 9, 2012, and Radiant Zero (輝きのゼロ, Kagayaki no Zero), which consists of 15 episodes from December 12, 2012 to March 27, 2013. A DVD release of this miniseries was sold online on June 21, 2013, under the label Ultra Zero Fight Perfect Collection (ウルトラゼロファイト パーフェクトコレクション, Urutora Zero Faito Pāfekuto Korekushon).

== Story ==
=== A New Power ===
Four monsters: Bemular, Telesdon, Sadola, and Gudon are mysteriously revived at the Monster Graveyard. Ultraman Zero eliminates them and then meets their master, Alien Bat Gurashie, who introduces his monster army, the Four Warrior Beasts from Hell. Zero tries to attack, however, Gurashie quickly traps him inside the Tector Gear Hatred, an armor which was created from the grudges of deceased monsters. Zero then suffers a one-sided defeat by EX Red King. Pigmon, a small monster who Gurashie accidentally revived, watches the battle from a safe distance. EX Red King notices Pigmon and tries to eliminate him, but Zero absorbs the attack and uses his Strong Corona Zero form to escape before killing the monster.

Later, Zero and Pigmon find themselves trapped in a pocket dimension. While trying to escape, Zero recalls his reason for arriving at the Monster Graveyard, and tries to understand why Ultraman Dyna's and Cosmos' powers remained inside him after their last battle together. Suddenly, Gurashie appears and brings Zero his next opponent: two clones of his alternate forms. He quickly realizes that his opponents are the images of his fear (and powers), and he faces them, defeating the true enemy, Galberos, and escaping from the pocket dimension. Once he is free, Gurashie releases two monsters, Gan-Q and Bemstar. As they fight Zero through the use of a wormhole connection, Zero assumes his second alternate form, Luna Miracle Zero, and kills them in one swoop.

Once the monsters are defeated, Gurashie reveals that the Four Warrior Beasts from Hell had achieved their purpose, and he absorbs their resentment in a climactic fight against Zero. In the middle of the battle, he exploits Pigmon by revealing that their life force is connected so that if Gurashie dies, Pigmon would also die. Zero is forced to submit to Gurashie's torture, however, Pigmon reassures him, which allows Zero to fight back by splitting into his alternate forms. Luna Miracle Zero separates Gurashie from the restless monster spirits and saves Pigmon's life, then Strong Corona Zero uses Gulnate Buster to defeat Gurashie. In the aftermath of the battle, Zero finds the purpose of his new powers and reunites with his comrades.

=== Radiant Zero ===
Five groups of aliens, known as the Darkness Five, discover Zero's capabilities from Gurashie. Meanwhile, on a distant world, King Silvergon wreaks havoc on a planet that belonged to the Fanegon. Ultraman Zero interferes and tames it using his Luna Miracle Zero form.

The Mother of Ultra appears and tells Zero that the Ultimate Force Zero have been turned into bronze statues. While investigating, Zero discovers the "Mother of Ultra" is Alien Hipporit Jatar, and that he is also going to be turned into a bronze statue. However, he uses this opportunity and finishes Jatar, saving himself and other victims from petrifaction. Victory is short-lived as another enemy appears in the form of Alien Temperor Villainous and his pet monster, Tyrant. Alien Mefilas Sly takes Pigmon hostage during the battle and attempts to lure Zero to the Monster Graveyard. Alien Groza Grocken and Alien Deathre Deathlogue join the fight. Zero is weakened but aided by Ultimate Force Zero, allowing Zero to race to the Monster Graveyard. Zero quickly defeats Sly and frees Pigmon, but the true enemy appears to be Kaiser Darkness, who is actually Ultraman Belial.

During the fight, Kaiser Darkness is revealed to be an empty shell which houses Belial's restless spirit and eventually possesses Zero. As Zero plunges into darkness, Belial massacres the members of the Ultimate Force Zero. The real Ultraman Zero is left powerless, while Belial uses his body to lead the Darkness Five in conquest. Pigmon bravely tries to stop them, and Belial's attempt to kill Pigmon is mysteriously stopped. Zero was able to halt Belial, and brings forth his strongest form, Shining Ultraman Zero. As Belial is expelled, Shining Ultraman Zero regains control over his body and reverses time to undo the damage caused by Belial, reviving the Ultimate Force Zero. This exhausts him and he loses some memories. He joins his comrades in returning home as they try to pick a new name for Pigmon.

After the end credits, it is revealed that Shining Ultraman Zero's time-reversal technique had also revived Belial. Realizing that Zero's strength comes from protecting those dear to him, Belial undertakes to make himself stronger while maintaining his leadership in the Darkness Five. Jatar is also revealed to have survived his apparent death.

== Cast ==
- Ultraman Zero (ウルトラマンゼロ, Urutoraman Zero): Mamoru Miyano (宮野 真守, Miyano Mamoru)
- Glenfire (グレンファイヤー, Gurenfaiyā): Tomokazu Seki (関 智一, Seki Tomokazu)
- Mirror Knight (ミラーナイト, Mirā Naito): Hikaru Midorikawa (緑川 光, Midorikawa Hikaru)
- Jean-Bot (ジャンボット, Jan Botto): Hiroshi Kamiya (神谷 浩史, Kamiya Hiroshi)
- Jean-Nine (ジャンナイン, Jan Nain): Miyu Irino (入野 自由, Irino Miyu)

=== A New Power-exclusive ===
- Alien Bat "Gurashie" (バット星人 グラシエ, Batto Seijin Gurashie): Shintarō Asanuma (浅沼 晋太郎, Asanuma Shintarō)

=== Radiant Zero-exclusives ===
- Sorcerous Sly (魔導のスライ, Madō no Surai): Hiroki Yasumoto (安元 洋貴, Yasumoto Hiroki)
- Nefarious Villainous (極悪のヴィラニアス, Gokuaku no Viraniasu): Holly Kaneko (金子 はりい, Kaneko Harii)
- Freezing Grocken (氷結のグロッケン, Hyōketsu no Gurokken): Kōichi Toshima (外島 孝一, Toshima Kōichi)
- Infernal Jatar (地獄のジャタール, Jigoku no Jatāru): Tetsuo Kishi (岸 哲生, Kishi Tetsuo)
- Imit-Mother of Ultra (にせウルトラの母, Nise Urutora no Haha): Miki Ōtani (大谷 美紀, Ōtani Miki)
- Fanegon (ファネゴン人, Fanegon-jin): Akira Matsuki (松木 朗, Matsuki Akira)
- Ultraman Belial (ウルトラマンベリアル, Urutoraman Beriaru): Yūki Ono (小野 友樹, Ono Yūki)

== Songs ==
Insert themes

- "Susume! Ultraman Zero" (すすめ! ウルトラマンゼロ, Susume! Urutoraman Zero; "Let's Go! Ultraman Zero")
  - Lyrics: Hideki Tama (田靡 秀樹, Tama Hideki), Tomohiro Yamaguchi (山口 智大, Yamaguchi Tomohiro)
  - Composition & Arrangement: Takao Konishi (小西 貴雄, Konishi Takao)
  - Artist: Voyager
  - Played in the first part of Ultra Zero Fight.
- "ULTRA FLY"
  - Composition: Hisashi Koyama
  - Arrangement: Koichiro Takahashi
  - Lyrics & Artist: Mamoru Miyano
  - Played in the second part of Ultra Zero Fight.

Ending theme

- "Yatsura ga Ultimate Force Zero! (奴らがウルティメイトフォースゼロ!, Yatsura ga Urutimeito Fōsu Zero!; "They Are Ultimate Force Zero!")
  - Lyrics: Sei Okazaki (岡崎 聖, Okazaki Sei)
  - Composition & Arrangement: Takao Konishi
  - Artist: Voyager
  - Played after the end of the second part of Ultra Zero Fight.

== See also ==
- Ultra Series – Complete list of official Ultraman-related shows
