= Ultra Fight Victory =

- The online poster release, featuring Ultraman Victory Knight and several Spark Dolls
- Genre: Tokusatsu; Sci-Fi; Action/Adventure; Superhero; Kaiju; Kyodai Hero
- Written by: Junichiro Ashiki
- Directed by: Koichi Sakamoto
- Starring: Kiyotaka Uji; Rina Koike; Hinata Yamada; Takuya Negishi
- Composer: Takao Konishi
- Country of origin: Japan
- No. of episodes: 13

Production
- Running time: 3–4 minutes (mini episode cut); 45 minutes (full episode)
- Production company: Tsuburaya Productions

Original release
- Network: TXN (TV Tokyo)
- Release: March 31 – June 23, 2015

Related
- Ultra Zero Fight; Ultra Fight Orb

Ultra Fight Victory (ウルトラファイトビクトリー, Urutora Faito Bikutorī) is a Japanese television miniseries and the 2nd entry in the Ultra Fight Series following Ultra Zero Fight produced by Tsuburaya Productions, aired during the ending segment of the New Ultraman Retsuden programming block on TV Tokyo. The official YouTube Channel of Tsuburaya Productions aired this miniseries legally with each episode that was uploaded to the Tsuburaya Productions YouTube Channel being deleted a week after their initial upload. It was available in regions that are currently region locked such as the United States. In promotion to the 2-part episodes 13 and 14 of Ultraman X, which features the crossover with the cast of Ultraman Ginga S, the Tsuburaya YouTube channel decided to re-aired a full episode instead of miniseries cuts, retaining the original subtitle. However, this video (like the first miniseries cut) was limited until it would be locked on October 24, 2015.

A DVD release of the miniseries was sold online and pre-orders were available to be made on the Japanese site of Amazon.com until December 16, 2015.

Currently a newly released English dub of Ultra Fight Victory is airing on Tsuburaya Productions's YouTube Channel. This new dub is a joint effort between William Winckler Productions and Tsuburaya Productions. The new president of Tsuburaya Productions stated that trying to introduce a foreign audience such as the West to Ultraman would prove to be quite difficult. It is not impossible as he stated that making a new Ultraman with homages to past Ultramans to appeal to foreign audiences is indeed possible. However, Ultra Fight Victory is not a new property. What seems to have occurred is that Tsubruaya Productions has drastically changed their plans to appeal to international audiences. This new English dub of Ultra Fight Victory is a new venture in Tsuburaya Productions's efforts to appeal to those who use online content and streaming platforms in foreign countries.

== Story ==
Sometime after the previous event, Sho and Sakuya returned to the Victorian Kingdom during their break from working with the UPG. Their reunion with Lepi was short-lived when the party was dragged underground by the monster Aribunta and its master, Yapool, who steals the Victorium Core. While Sho as Ultraman Victory was left powerless to stop Aribunta, a blue Ultraman named Ultraman Hikari saved him, granting the Knight Timbre, which allows Victory to achieve a new form called Ultraman Victory Knight and finishes Aribunta. As Hikari narrates, in tens of thousands of years, the Space Emperor revives himself through a space distortion that can be felt from the whole galaxy. Ultraman King sent three Ultramen, Ultraman Ace, Ultraman Leo, and Astra to stop him. Hikari invented the Knight Timbre as a means to seal the Space Emperor's darkness.

Soon, the Leo brothers fought Yapool's Terrible-Monsters that were guarding the Space Emperor's distortion on Planet Guar (惑星グア, Wakusei Gua) while Ace fought his old nemesis, Ace-Killer on Satellite Golgotha (衛星ゴルゴダ, Eisei Gorugoda), who had Hikaru Raido/Ultraman Ginga captured and crucified. With Ultraman Victory's battle tactics uploaded by Yapool, Ace-Killer becomes Victory-Killer and pummels the Ultraman into submission. Even with Victory Knight's arrival, Yapool already sent Lunatyx to take care of the captured Ginga until Shepherdon, who was revived by Sho, turns the tables and defeated them before healing Ginga and Ace. The three Ultras joined the Leo Brothers on Guar and Yapool likewise joined his Terrible-Monster after delivering the Victorium Core to the Space Emperor. Ginga and Victory used the Ultraman Ginga Victory combination and defeated Yapool but in his dying breath, delivered the last of his energy to the distortion. The emperor, Juda Spectre, fully revives and sent his monster, Super Grand King Spectre to deal with the Ultras. Victory left Grand King to the rest of his comrades while he assumes Victory Knight again and fought Juda. Eventually, his refusal to surrender awakened the Victorium Core, which instead of weakening Juda and Super Grand King Spectre, allowed the Ultras to finish them.

Using the Knight Timbre for the final time, Victory returns the Victorium Core to the Earth and Victorium Kingdom. Hikari congratulated Sho and Hikaru over a good job. The former tried to return the Knight Timbre but Hikari refused, ensuring the Earth's future would be safe in their hands.

== Cast ==
- Sho (ショウ, Shō): Kiyotaka Uji (宇治 清高, Uji Kiyotaka)
- Sakuya (サクヤ): Rina Koike (小池 里奈, Koike Rina)
- Lepi (レピ, Repi): Hinata Yamada (山田 日向, Yamada Hinata)
- Hikaru Raido (礼堂 ヒカル, Raidō Hikaru): Takuya Negishi (根岸 拓哉, Negishi Takuya)
- Ultraman Hikari (ウルトラマンヒカリ, Urutoraman Hikari; Voice): Keiichi Nanba (難波 圭一, Nanba Keiichi)
- Yapool (ヤプール, Yapūru; Voice), KillerTrance Voice: Tesshō Genda (玄田 哲章, Genda Tesshō)
- Ultraman Ace (ウルトラマンエース, Urutoraman Ēsu; Voice): Keiji Takamine (高峰 圭二, Takamine Keiji)
- Ultraman Leo (ウルトラマンレオ, Urutoraman Reo; Voice): Ryu Manatsu (真夏 竜, Manatsu Ryū)
- Astra (アストラ, Asutora; Voice): Chikara Ōsaka (逢坂 力, Ōsaka Chikara)
- Juda Spectre (ジュダ・スペクター, Juda Supekutā; Voice): Nobuaki Kanemitsu (金光 宣明, Kanemitsu Nobuaki)

== Songs ==
Opening theme

- "Ultraman Victory no Uta 2015" (ウルトラマンビクトリーの歌 2015, Urutoraman Bikutorī no Uta Nisenjūgo; "The Song of Ultraman Victory 2015")
  - Lyrics: Sei Okazaki (岡崎 聖, Okazaki Sei)
  - Composition & Arrangement: Takao Konishi (小西 貴雄, Konishi Takao)
  - Artist: Voyager with Hikaru Raido (Takuya Negishi) & Sho (Kiyotaka Uji) feat. Takamiy
  - During the airing of full episode Ultra Fight Victory, this song was used as the ending theme in place of Kirameku Mirai ~Yume no Ginga e~.

Ending theme

- Kirameku Mirai ~Yume no Ginga e~ (キラメク未来 ～夢の銀河へ～; "Sparkling Future ~To the Galaxy of Dreams~")
  - Lyrics: Hideki Tama (田靡 秀樹, Tama Hideki)
  - Composition & Arrangement: Takao Konishi
  - Artist: Voyager feat. Ultraman Ginga (Tomokazu Sugita)

Insert theme

- "Ultraman Ace" (ウルトラマンエース, Urutoraman Ēsu)
  - Lyrics: Kyōichi Azuma (東 京一, Azuma Kyōichi)
  - Composition & Arrangement: Masahiko Aoi (葵 まさひこ, Aoi Masahiko)
  - Artist: Honey Knights (ハニー・ナイツ, Hanī Naitsu), Misuzu Children's Choral Group (みすず児童合唱団, Misuzu Jidō Gasshōdan)
- "Ultraman Leo" (ウルトラマンレオ, Urutoraman Reo)
  - Lyrics: Yū Aku (阿久 悠, Aku Yū)
  - Composition & Arrangement: Makoto Kawaguchi (川口 真, Kawaguchi Makoto)
  - Artist: Ryu Manatsu, Mizuumi Boys and Girls Choir (少年少女合唱団みずうみ, Shōnen Shōjo Gasshōdan Mizuumi)
- "Ultraman Ginga no Uta 2015" (ウルトラマンギンガの歌 2015, Urutoraman Ginga no Uta Nisenjūgo; "The Song of Ultraman Ginga 2015")
  - Lyrics: Hideki Tama, Kiyoshi Okazaki
  - Composition & Arrangement: Takao Konishi
  - Artist: Voyager with Hikaru Raido (Takuya Negishi) & Sho (Kiyotaka Uji) feat. Takamiy

== See also ==
- Ultra Series - Complete list of official Ultraman-related shows
