= List of Ultraman Orb characters =

Director Kiyotaka Taguchi (left), the casts of Ultraman Orb (from left to right: Jugglus Juggler, Ittetsu Shibukawa, Gai Kurenai, Naomi Yumeno, Jetta Hayami and Shin Matsudo) and Ultraman Orb (right).

This is the character list for the 2016 Ultra Series Ultraman Orb. The series as well spawned several continuations, such as Ultraman Orb The Movie, Ultraman Orb: The Origin Saga and Ultra Fight Orb.

== Recurring characters ==
=== Gai Kurenai ===
Ultraman Orb's 4 Fusion Up forms: Above (from left to right): Burnmite, Spacium Zeperion, and Hurricane Slash.; Below: Thunder Breastar

Gai Kurenai (クレナイ・ガイ, Kurenai Gai) is a mysterious, yet cheerful young adventurer that travels around the Earth for a long time while playing his Orbnica (オーブニカ, Ōbunika) (Note: A pun of "Orb" (オーブ, Ōbu) and "Harmonica" (ハーモニカ, Hāmonika)) musical instrument. His true identity is the mysterious warrior Ultraman Orb (ウルトラマンオーブ, Urutoraman Ōbu), who descended from beyond the outer galaxy to protect the Earth and stop the resurrection of the Lord Monsters. He possesses abilities that are beyond what normal humans are capable of, such as withstanding cold environments for a long time, performing superhuman leaps and displaying the use of ESP to detect objects from beneath the ground. Having lived on Earth for a long time (since 1,800 BC), he has a habit of remarking the past events and nostalgia that seemingly faded in the modern times due to constant development in the human civilization.

Sometime in the past, Orb's power was located at the unexplored mountain peak called Crusader's Peak (戦士の頂, Senshi no Itadaki) from distant planet called O-50 (オーフィフティ, Ō Fifuti). Two young warriors, Gai and Juggler and climbed towards the peak and try to obtain its powers. Gai was chosen to be the Warrior of Light and had the powers of Orb bestowed upon him, transforming into an Ultraman he is currently known for. After foiling the invasion of Bezelbs, Gai completed his first mission and embark on a journey to collect all four elements of Orbcalibur. At one point he took a Planet Cobol native Shorty under his wing before the latter died from disarming Juggler's Balloonga Bomb.

Gai descended to Earth as part of his mission to prevent Orochi's revival but his ally-turned-adversary Jugglus Juggler follows in suit, unsealing Lord Monsters to collect their cards by having Orb defeated them. As a result, from Orb's battle with Maga-Zetton, Gai lost his true form (designated Orb Origin) and seemingly killing Natasha, a woman he befriended. He eventually made his way to Japan in 2016 and took refuge in the SSP base after befriending its members. After using Thunder Breastar to destroy Orochi, Gai once more suffers from the fear of his own power, which led to Naomi's hospitalization when said form nearly killed her. Once discovering Natasha's survival and Naomi being her descendant, Gai regains faith in himself and his true form after 108 years. During his final battle with Magatano-Orochi, Orb finds himself being unable to deliver any attacks to the monster and was considered defeat. When reverted to his human form, Gai deals with Juggler in his state of mental breakdown and learned that his own rival actually rescued Natasha from Maga-Zetton. This allows Gai to finally giving his respect to Juggler after years of seeing each other as bitter enemies and eventually teaming up to destroy Magatano-Orochi. In aftermath of the battle, Gai left to parts unknown while assuring Naomi that he would return when the time needed.

Orb Origin, Ultraman Orb's true form.

In his early days as Ultraman Orb, Gai transforms solely through the Orbcalibur (オーブカリバー, Ōbu Karibā). At that time, Orb is known by the form as Origin the First (オリジン・ザ・ファースト, Orijin Za Fāsuto), with his red color dominated majority of his body. His main finisher is the Origium Ray (オリジウム光線, Orijiumu Kōsen). Following the success of his first mission, Orb evolves into Orb Origin (オーブオリジン, Ōbu Orijin), gaining the additional black marking to his body and utilizes the Orbcalibur during combat. This form was originally lost upon destroying Maga-Zetton, but regained it after obtaining a blank card from Natasha's spirit and restoring faith in his own power. While the Orbcalibur is capable of firing each of elemental Calibur attacks separately, Orb Origin's main finisher is the Orb Supreme Calibur (オーブスプリームカリバー, Ōbu Supurīmu Karibā), a power drawn by activating all 4 elemental Caliburs on the Orbcalibur simultaneously, initiated when Gai inserting the smaller Orbcalibur into the Orb Ring and charging it, then pulling a trigger on the sword hilt and spinning the center wheel to fully activate it. This action launches a massive energy beam from the sword, but can also create a citywide explosion when used with full anger. Apart from that, he can also utilize elemental attacks using the Orbcalibur:

- Orb Ground Calibur (オーブグランドカリバー, Ōbu Gurando Karibā): Performed by stabbing the Earth with Orbcalibur, summoning electrical voltages that circle towards the opponent. The Earth element was obtained from Murnau after she escaped in Jewel Planet Cobol.
- Orb Flame Calibur (オーブフレイムカリバー, Ōbu Fureimu Karibā): A circular flame that shrouds the target with a large circle before eliminating them. The Fire element was obtained from citizens of Planet Ganun Api after foiling Count Orlock and defeating Magma Monster Gora.
- Orb Water Calibur (オーウォーターカリバー, Ōbu Wōtā Karibā): Performed by evaporating the target in a giant whirlpool. The Water element was obtained from Gamakujira's defeat in Water Planet Nuok.
- Orb Wind Calibur (オーブウインドカリバー, Ōbu Uindo Karibā): Performed by conjuring the target in a giant cyclone. The Wind element is the final one to be obtained from Wind Planet Guillermo after an encounter from Juggler, who stole it from the Alien Zartana.

After the success of his second mission, Gai obtains the Orb Ring (オーブリング, Ōbu Ringu), a legendary device that allows him to utilize Ultra Fusion Cards (ウルトラフュージョンカード, Urutora Fyūjon Kādo) and harness their powers. It was mainly used on Earth during Orb's period of losing Orb Origin. Orb can also channel the power of these cards even in human form, as shown when Gai blocked an incoming attack by Alien Zetton Maddock via Ultraman's card. Once his Color Timer (カラータイマー, Karā Taimā) starts blinking, the Fusion Up form begins to break apart so he must end the fight quickly before entering the time limit. After defeating a Lord Monster, Gai would use the Orb Ring to harvest its Maga Crystal and acquire the corresponding Ultra Fusion Card based on the Ultra Warrior that was used to seal the monster. Once a card is acquired, he would store it in his Ultra Fusion Card Holder (ウルトラフュージョンカードホルダー, Urutora Fyūjon Kādo Horudā) until the time would be needed to use said card.

By initiating Fusion Up, Orb can harness the power of two Ultra Warriors at once through his forms:

- Spacium Zeperion (スペシウムゼペリオン, Supeshiumu Zeperion): (Note: Although spelled Spacium in official material, Crunchyroll subtitle spelled it as Specium Zeperion.) Orb's default form, aside from his original Orb Origin form, based on Ultraman and Ultraman Tiga. In this form, Orb relies on energy-based attacks. He is also capable of channeling either Ultraman's various abilities, such as the Ultra Barrier and Ultra Shower, or one of the unique abilities of Tiga's Type Change forms, such as Power Type's strength and Sky Type's speed. Orb's finisher in this form is the Sperion Ray (スペリオン光線, Superion Kōsen).
- Burnmite (バーンマイト, Bānmaito): Orb's strength form based on Ultraman Taro and Ultraman Mebius. In this form, Orb is capable of channeling either Taro's acrobatic feats or Mebius Burning Brave's pyrokinetic-based attacks. Orb's finishers in this form are the Stobium Dynamite (ストビュームダイナマイト, Sutobyūmu Dainamaito) and Stobium Burst (ストビュームバースト, Sutobyūmu Bāsuto).
- Hurricane Slash (ハリケーンスラッシュ, Harikēn Surasshu): Orb's speed form based on Ultraman Jack and Ultraman Zero. In this form, Orb is capable of utilizing teleportation and wielding twin energy boomerang knives known as the Orb Slugger (オーブスラッガー, Ōbu Suraggā), which can also combine into a trident known as the Orb Slugger Lance (オーブスラッガーランス, Ōbu Suraggā Ransu). Orb's finishers with the Orb Slugger Lance are Orb Lancer Shoot (オーブランサーシュート, Ōbu Ransā Shūto), Big Bang Thrust (ビッグバングスラスト, Biggu Bangu Surasuto), and Trident Slash (トライデントスラッシュ, Toraidento Surasshu).
- Thunder Breastar (サンダーブレスター, Sandā Buresutā): (Note: Although spelled Breastar in official material, Crunchyroll subtitle spelled it as Breaster.) Orb's berserker form based on Zoffy and Ultraman Belial. In this form, Orb's fighting skills revolve around brute strength, reflecting that of a rampant, where he will even use the environments around him to his own advantage, such as tearing off a building and throwing it towards the opponent. Orb's voice and grunts also become distorted due to his savage nature. Originally, Gai was reluctant to use this form due to both his notoriety and Belial's refusal but was given approval in response to Gai's anger over Princess Tamayura's loss by Maga-Orochi. This form also causes Gai to lose control over himself using various means to destroy his opponent and had almost killed both Naomi and a Z-VTOL pilot while fighting against Galactron. This eventually shook his will and had his reputation tarnished until Gai learned to accept his inner darkness, giving him more control over this form and eventually restoring his reputation when shielding the SSP members from Zeppandon's attacks. Orb's finisher in this form is the Zedcium Ray (ゼットシウム光線, Zettoshiumu Kōsen).
- Lightning Attacker (ライトニングアタッカー, Raitoningu Atakkā): Based on Ultraman Ginga and Ultraman X, Orb gains a body based on futuristic technology known as the Cyber Mechanic (サイバーメカニック, Saibā Mekanikku) which allows him to perform electricity-based attacks. Orb's finisher in this form is the Attacker Ginga X (アタッカーギンガエックス, Atakkā Ginga Ekkusu).
- Emerium Slugger (エメリウムスラッガー, Emeriumu Suraggā): Based on Ultraseven and Ultraman Zero. Orb's finisher in this form is the Wide Slugger Shot (ワイドスラッガーショット, Waido Suraggā Shotto).

In Ultraman Orb The Movie, Ultraman Orb gain access to a form known as Orb Trinity (オーブトリニティ, Ōbu Torinitī), which uses the aspects of New Generation Ultra Warriors, Ginga, Victory and X. Because of how it uses three component Ultramen instead of two, this form is regarded as Trinity Fusion (トリニティフュージョン, Toriniti Fyūjon). Orb's main weapon is Orb Slasher (オーブスラッシャー, Ōbu Surasshā), the device that invokes said transformation, which allows him to perform three finishers; Trinitium Break (トリニティウムブレイク, Torinitiumu Bureiku), Trinitium Shoot (トリニティウムシュート, Torinitiumu Shūto) and Trinitium Giga Slash (トリニティウム光輪, Torinitiumu Kōrin). By himself, he can perform Trinitium Straight (トリニティウムストレート, Torinitiumu Sutorēto) flying punch and tapping into his component's own powers, such as Victory's EX Red King Knuckle and a portion of X's Gomora Armor. In Ultraman Geed the Movie, Orb can summon the entirety of Gomora Armor to gain access into cyberspace and rescues Geed from Galactron MK-II's digitization.

In addition, the Data Carddass game Ultraman Fusion Fight! also introduced game-exclusive Fusion Up. Alongside the original Fusion Up, Orb retained the original attacks of past Ultra Warriors in addition to newer attacks.

- Photon Victorium (フォトンビクトリウム, Foton Bikutoriumu): Based on Ultraman Gaia and Ultraman Victory, Orb is equipped with a pair of huge gauntlets on his arms that allow him to either manipulate earth or create shockwave eruptions. Orb's finisher in this form is the Photorium Knuckle (フォトリウムナックル, Fotoriumu Nakkuru). (Note: Originally labelled as Photorium Shoot (フォトリウムシュート, Fotoriumu Shūto).)
- Sky Dash Max (スカイダッシュマックス, Sukai Dasshu Makkusu): Based on Ultraman Tiga Sky Type and Ultraman Max, Orb is equipped with both a scarf around his neck known as the Maxtole (マックストール, Makkusutōru) and a pair of twin bracers on his arms. Orb's finisher in this form is the Macbalt Attack (マクバルトアタック, Makubaruto Atakku).
- Full Moon Xanadium (フルムーンザナディウム, Furu Mūn Zanadiumu): Based on Ultraman Cosmos and Ultraman X, Orb's fighting skills revolve around agility and speed. Orb's finisher in this form is the Fulldium Ray (フルディウム光線, Furudiumu Kōsen).
- Leo Zero Knuckle (レオゼロナックル, Reo Zero Nakkuru): Based on Ultraman Leo and Ultraman Zero. Orb's finisher in this form is the Knuckle Cross Beam (ナックルクロスビーム, Nakkuru Kurosu Bīmu).
- Zeperion Solgent (ゼペリオンソルジェント, Zeperion Sorujento): Based on Ultraman Tiga and Ultraman Dyna. Orb's finisher in this form is the Multi Flash Slicer (マルチフラッシュスライサー, Maruchi Furasshu Suraisā).
- Thunder Miracle (サンダーミラクル, Sandā Mirakuru): Based on Ultraman Dyna and Ultraman Belial, Orb is able to use black hole-based attacks. Orb's finisher in this form is the Thunder Miracle Attack (サンダーミラクルアタック, Sandā Mirakuru Atakku).
- Slugger Ace (スラッガーエース, Suraggā Ēsu): Based on Ultraseven and Ultraman Ace, Orb is equipped with the Vertical Slugger (バーチカルスラッガー, Bāchikaru Suraggā). Orb's finisher in this form is the Slugger Ace Slicer (スラッガーエーススライサー, Suraggā Ēsu Suraisā).
- Knight Rikidater (ナイトリキデイター, Naito Rikideitā): Based on Ultraman Agul and Ultraman Hikari, Orb is equipped with twin energy swords on his arms known as the Knight Agul Blade (ナイトアグルブレード, Naito Aguru Burēdo). Orb's finisher in this form is the Crusher Knight Liquidator (クラッシャーナイトリキデイター, Kurasshā Naito Rikideitā).
- Spacium Schtrom (スペシウムシュトローム, Supeshiumu Shutorōmu): Based on Ultraman and Ultraman Nexus. Orb's finisher in this form is the Ultra Full Burst (ウルトラフルバースト, Urutora Furu Bāsuto).
- Power Strong (パワーストロング, Pawā Sutorongu): Based on Ultraman Tiga Power Type and Ultraman Dyna Strong Type. Orb's finisher in this form is the Galracium Hammer (ガルラシウムハンマー, Garurashiumu Hanmā).
- Thunder Stream (サンダーストリーム, Sandā Sutorīmu): Based on Ultraman Agul and Ultraman Belial, Orb is equipped with a spear known as the Giga Trident (ギガトライデント, Giga Toraidento). Orb's finisher in this form is the Thunder Stream Neptune (サンダーストリームネプチューン, Sandā Sutorīmu Nepuchūn).
- Mebium Especially (メビュームエスペシャリー, Mebyūmu Esupesharī): Based on Ultraman Mebius and Ultraman Ginga, Orb has the ability to generate and use rainbow-colored light swords either as melee weapons or flying drones. Orb's finisher is the Mebiuspecially Blade (メビュースペシャリーブレード, Mebyūsupesharī Burēdo).
- Breastar Knight (ブレスターナイト, Buresutā Naito): Based on Zoffy and Ultraman Hikari. Orb's finisher in this form is the Knight 87 Shoot (ナイト87シュート, Naito Hachijū-nana Shūto).
- Strium Galaxy (ストリウムギャラクシー, Sutoriumu Gyarakushī): Based on Ultraman Taro and Ultraman Max. Orb's finisher in this form is the Stoxium Cannon (ストキシウムカノン, Sutokishiumu Kanon).

Gai Kurenai is portrayed by Hideo Ishiguro (石黒 英雄, Ishiguro Hideo). Meanwhile, the voice actor for the Orb Ring is Takahiro Sakurai (櫻井 孝宏, Sakurai Takahiro), who voices Ultraman in Ultraman Festival 2016.

The conception of Gai Kurenai/Ultraman Orb was made by the series' director Kiyotaka Taguchi, based on Dan Moroboshi/Ultraseven from the Ultra Series' second installment Ultraseven. Takao Nakano soon added more fictional wanderer attributes such as Japanese novel Lone Samurai Monjiro, actor Clint Eastwood and Tsunehiko Kamijō's image song, Dareka ga Kaze no Naka de. All this is done under the purpose to "re-invoke the wanderer hero in the 21st century world".

=== Jugglus Juggler ===
Jugglus Juggler wielding the Dark Ring in his Demon Form.

Phantom Demon Jugglus Juggler (無幻魔人 ジャグラスジャグラー, Mugen Majin Jagurasu Jagurā; (Note: Appeared in all Ultraman Orb media except episodes 5, 7, 14, 15, 21 and 22 of original series.)) (Note: His full name is written as "Juggrus-Juggler" in the opening sequence of The Origin Saga.) is the main antagonist of the series and Gai Kurenai/Ultraman Orb's archenemy. Usually appears as a well-dressed young human male, he is capable of transforming into an armored form called Demon Form (魔人態, Majin-tai). (Note: Prior to the development of his crescent scar, his original Demon Form is called Early Style (アーリースタイル, Ārī Sutairu).) He is a very emphatic and short-tempered creature who is known to be easily irritated to the point of violently tantrums. In the series, Juggler's entire act of atrocities stems from his jealousy over Gai for not being chosen as the warrior of light and his entire motivation is to surpass Ultraman Orb himself.

Long ago, Jugglus and Gai once fought as comrades and constantly competed with each other. But after Gai acquired the light of Orb, their relationship began to strain as Jugglus' jealousy slowly grew. Juggler accompanied Gai on his mission to stop Psychi and his Bezelbs but denounced his support after damaging the Tree of Life, preferring to participate on his own proxy. After the battle, the two went on separate ways as Juggler becomes a mercenary who participated in various wars from outer space until he landed on a job as the Alien Zartana' bodyguard and fight against Gai. He was soon imprisoned in Planet 484 where he met Biranki and took her under his wing as they led a prison break before Gai helped the Interstellar Alliance to imprison them. With his jealousy for Gai reached climax, Juggler was bestowed the Dark Ring as he completely fell into the darkness and tails Gai to Earth. Whereas Gai tries to stop Maga-Orochi from awakening, Juggler freed the Lord Monster and harvested their cards upon destruction by Orb.

In the present day (after collecting all Lord Monster cards), he awakened Maga-Orochi through the Ultraman Belial card he obtained by backstabbing the Planetary Invasion Coalition and used Zeppandon to fight Orb. After losing the Dark Ring, Juggler trains by perfecting his new attack and prepared for what it seemed to be the final fight with Gai/Orb before being defeated once more. Using his apprehension by VTL, he relayed Magatano-Orochi's awakening to the public via VTL and tricked them to help in its resurrection as well. After escaping, Juggler prepared to kill Naomi but when she willingly took responsibility of her own death, he was hesitant to do so and instead rescued her from a crashed Z-VTOL. After discovering that Juggler rescued Natasha long ago, he was redeemed in his rival's--Gai's--eye and eventually joined Orb after being persuaded by Naomi. During the battle, Juggler would sacrifice himself to restrain the monster so that Orb could deliver the final blow. Juggler would survive the attack without a scratch and watched Gai for the last time from a distance. In Ultraman Orb The Movie, Juggler reclaimed the Dark Ring from Murnau after his undercover and fought against the Dark Alien Army before saving the SSP and the petrified Ultras, Ginga, Victory and X. He was last seen bidding farewell to Gai, waiting his rival on space.

Being a warrior of such caliber as Gai, Juggler is capable of many extraordinary feats such as teleportation and enhanced physical reflexes. In addition, he employs the Jashin Style (蛇心流, Jashin-ryū) of swordsmanship, wielding a katana called the Jashin Blade (蛇心剣, Jashin-ken). He can employ attacks such as the powerful Jashin Blade's Sword-Draw Slash (蛇心剣・抜刀斬, Jashin-ken Battō-zan). In his final confrontation with Gai/Ultraman Orb, he unveils a new attack that he had perfected called the Jashin Blade's Crescent Moon Shockwave (蛇心剣・新月斬波, Jashin-ken Shingetsu Zanpa), which launches a dark crescent wave from his sword.

Jugglus' main tools are Dark Ring (ダークリング, Dāku Ringu) and a set of Monster Cards, which allow him to awaken the Lord Monsters, summoning monsters or manifesting their powers. He also possess a Terrible-Monster-type Monster Cards, which are considered rarity. Upon an Ultra Monster's destruction, Jugglus can harvest their remains to create a corresponding card, which he does so to gain the sets of Lord Monsters. The Dark Ring disappeared from Zeppandon's destruction, finding its way to Murnau before Juggler reclaim it and for him to abandon it once more. Among the monsters he summoned were Aribunta, Cherubim, Black King and Zeppandon, with the former three were during his service in Planetary Invasion Coalition and the latter on his own.

Jugglus Juggler is portrayed by Takaya Aoyagi (青柳 尊哉, Aoyagi Takaya). Although the official brochure of The Origin Saga stated that Gai and Juggler are natives of O-50, Aoyagi denied it as such.

=== Biranki ===
Space Girl Biranki (宇宙少女 ビランキ, Uchū Shōjo Biranki) is a character that appeared in Chapters 3, 5-2, and 10 of Ultraman Orb Chronicle.

Biranki was once a princess of an unnamed planet that was born with the ability to manipulate monsters. After being imprisoned by her parents due to the danger her power wields, her anger summoned Gango and nearly destroyed the planet before she was removed to Planet 484 by Interstellar Alliance. Ever since she was rescued by Juggler, Biranki falls in love with him, having prophesied his aid in her dream and assisted Juggler in the prison break. After Gai and Shorty neutralised the situation, Biranki was imprisoned again to a different cell, separating from Juggler.

Sometime later, Biranki escaped her confinement and went to Earth with the saucer monster Hungler to assist Juggler. After said monster's destruction by Orb, Juggler saved and left Biranki on another planet to avoid her intervention.

Biranki's main ability is to manipulate monsters, with her influence even reach other dimensions. Among the examples are:

- Brainwave Monster Gango (脳波怪獣 ギャンゴ, Nōha Kaijū Gyango; 3): An alternate dimension monster manipulated by Biranki into destroying a city, which resulted in her imprisonment in the first place. Gango was summoned again in hopes of assisting her and Juggler in escaping prison. Alongside the freed inmates of Planet 484, Gango participated in a battle against Ultraman Orb but was eliminated by his Orb Ground Calibur. First appeared in episode 11 of Ultraman.
- Saucer Creature Hungler (円盤生物 ハングラー, Enban Seibutsu Hangurā; 5-2): A monster that accompanied Biranki to Earth in the 1950s to eliminate Ultraman Orb. In hopes of luring Gai, Hungler attacked random ships and airplanes in the Burlesque (バーレスク, Bāresuku) region of South America, creating the disappearing incidents called Burlesque Triangle (バーレスク・トライアングル, Bāresuku Toraianguru). (Note: Based on the real life disappearing incidents in Bermuda Triangle.) Orb fought the monster as Spacium Zeperion and it fell into the Coral Beach, creating a tsunami upon impact. First appeared in episode 45 of Ultraman Leo.

=== Light of Orb ===
The Light of Orb (オーブの光, Ōbu no Hikari) is a bluish halo that resided at the Crusader's Peak in Planet O-50. After rejecting Juggler, the halo chooses Gai as the bearer of Ultraman Orb's power and his first mission to stop Psychi and his army of Bezelbs. The ring would later provide Gai with various missions, including the hunt for the crystals making up the Orbcalibur and giving him the Orb Ring to stop the awakening of Maga-Orochi.

Outside the events of Ultraman Orb, the Light of Orb has also bestowed selected climbers of Crusader's Peak with their respective powers. Some of these examples include Rosso, Blu, Grigio, Fuma, and Sagittari.

Credited as the Voice of Light (光の声, Hikari no Koe) in Ultraman Orb: The Chronicle, the Light of Orb is voiced by Takahiro Sakurai, who also provides the voice announcements of Orb Ring in Ultraman Orb.

== Main characters of Ultraman Orb ==
=== SSP ===
The Something Search People (サムシングサーチピープル, Samushingu Sāchi Pīpuru; SSP) is a mysterious phenomenon tracking site which bends on uncovering paranormal events and monster sightings. They usually patrol in the SSP-7 car and is always the place where Shibukawa (and by extent the whole VTL Squad) relies on information when the said group incapable of researching on their own. This group was founded by Naomi Yumeno from her childhood dream of Ultraman Orb fighting against Maga-Zetton, and is also the team's sole breadwinner by engaging in multiple part-time jobs. During Magatano-Orochi's rampage, they received the original copy of Pacific Records from Akie Kishine and each played a major part in the final battle. After said monster's destruction, the SSP website has achieved a grand total of 240 million worldwide views, thus marking it as their greatest success.

The group's name is simply one letter short from SSSP (Science Special Search Party), the main investigation attack team from Ultraman. Instead of being website managers, the original idea behind the SSP was to follow the example of Kogoro Akechi, the fictional character from Edogawa Ranpo's novel series, The Boy Detectives Club.

- Naomi Yumeno (夢野 ナオミ, Yumeno Naomi): (Note: Her given name is written in kanji as "奈緒美".) SSP's team captain and the original series' secondary protagonist. She is known for her energetic and cheerful personality but also had a running gag of tripping down when walking out. As the great-granddaughter of Natasha, she inherited several traits from the former such as the battle of Orb with Maga-Zetton and memories of Gai's Orbnica melody among others. While obvious to the dangers ahead, she displays a huge bravery in pursuing truths and sometimes caught within near death experiences. During Magatano-Orochi's rampage, Naomi was kidnapped by Juggler in an attempt to drive Gai into despair but when she willingly took responsibility of her own death, he instead rescued her from a crashed Z-VTOL just like her great grandmother, as well as playing a huge part in Juggler's redemption. Naomi Yumeno is portrayed by Miyabi Matsuura (松浦 雅, Matsūra Miyabi).
- Jetta Hayami (早見 ジェッタ, Hayami Jetta): (Note: "Jetta" is a nickname for him, and his real given name is Zenta (善太).) is a cameraman and updating the SSP's website. Informative and self-proclaimed adventurous, he has an affinity for UFO and UMA and dream is to become a celebrity through his research on the world's mysteries. As a child, Jetta was reminded by his father that being a hero doesn't mean to always put his own life in harm. Of all SSP members, Jetta is the most active person in uncovering Ultraman Orb's true identity. Jetta Hayami is portrayed by Naoto Takahashi (髙橋 直人, Takahashi Naoto). As a child, Jetta is portrayed by Atsuki Hagihara (萩原 淳貴, Hagihara Atsuki).
- Shin Matsudo (松戸 シン, Matsudo Shin): (Note: His given name is written in kanji as "森".) SSP's research analyst. He is a 23-year-old genius who graduated by skipping years in college and gains popularity since his childhood. He is knowledgeable in state-of-the-art physics, creating ingenious inventions and researching ancient civilizations but lacks common sense. A genius himself, Shin has made multiple scientific achievements ever since he was a child, to the point of receiving a letter from Stephen Hawking in his days as a middle school student while receiving moral support from the Kofune Manufacturing president Soichi Kofune. He has multiple childhood dreams such as building a transporter, a heroic robot and becoming a veterinarian. Shin Matsudo is portrayed by Hiroaki Nerio (ねりお 弘晃, Nerio Hiroaki).

=== VTL Squad ===
VTL Squad (ビートル隊, Bītoru-tai; Versatile Tactical Leader) (Note: The word "Leader" is spelled as "Lerder" by "m-78.jp" official site, though its badge stated to be otherwise.) is an international military organization founded under the United Nations branch and is based on Paris. They possess a connection to the independent group SSP via their captain, Shibukawa and the Kofune Manufacturing in terms of mechanics. While originally a simple military organization, frequent monster attacks starting from the advent of Maga-Basser in Japan forced them to revise their arsenal and combat strength in order to efficiently combat against monster attacks. After Orb as Thunder Breastar endangered both a Z-VTOL pilot and Naomi, VTL labelled the Ultra Warrior as a public enemy until he saved the SSP members during Zeppandon's rampage. During Jugglus Juggler's capture and Magatano-Orochi's revival, VTL members decides to take account of Juggler's warning and his advice to stop the monster by destroying the Tokyo Tower (the centerpoint of its revival) with their Spiner R-1 missile but realises too late that they were tricked into fulfilling their prophesied destruction.

According to Kiyotaka Taguchi, VTL is a small contrast to most of the attack teams from past Ultra Series as this team lacks a research department, further explaining their ties to SSP. This is also due to Taguchi himself viewing them as "ordinary street officers", wanting to give the SSP a larger screen time. Unlike other regular officers, high ranking VTL Squad members were previously Japanese government officials instead of top soldiers.

Members

- Ittetsu Shibukawa (渋川 一徹, Shibukawa Ittetsu): The captain of VTL Japan's Special Intelligence Unit (情報特務隊, Jōhō Tokumu-tai) and Naomi's uncle, being her mother's younger brother-in-law. (Note: It is unrevealed whether Shibukawa is Keiko's younger sister's husband or she is his older brother's wife.) A godan in Judo and sandan in Karate, he has a strong sense in responsibility and is fearful of Naomi wandering off investigating paranormal cases but does shows some support by notifying the SSP of paranormal activity or visiting them for information. When Orb's public reputation was tarnished, Shibukawa still retained his faith in the Ultra Warrior and was excited when Jetta managed to filmed his actions of saving them. During Magatano-Orochi's rampage, Shibukawa used his position in the group and through SSP's help, he informed the Z-VTOL fleet to attack Magatano-Orochi's weak spot. Ittetsu Shibukawa is portrayed by Shingo Yanagisawa (柳沢 慎吾, Yanagisawa Shingo), who previously done the dub voice for Charles Morgan in Ultraman: Towards the Future.
- Ryutaro Suganuma (菅沼 龍太郎, Suganuma Ryutarō; 24): VTL Japan's chief. He is portrayed by Shirō Sano (佐野 史郎, Sano Shirō).
- Nagamine (長嶺; 24): VTL Japan's high-ranking member. He is portrayed by Masayuki Ito (伊藤 正之, Itō Masayuki).
- Sakai (阪井; 24): VTL Japan's high-ranking member. He is portrayed by Tsuyoshi Nakano (中野 剛, Nakano Tsuyoshi).

Arsenal and mechas

- Super Gun Revolver (スーパーガンリボルバー, Sūpā Gan Riborubā): A handheld revolver that launches energy bullet ammunition. The gun is based on a revolver, while its barrel and namesake is a tribute to SSSP's Super Gun (スーパーガン, Sūpā Gan) from Ultraman.
- Z-VTOL (ゼットビートル, Zetto Bītoru): Coded S050, this VTOL jet is the crew's main transportation and is always seen when fighting against giant monster threats. Despite being an aerial craft, it can also function in a similar way to a space fighter. This ship is also made in the Kofune Manufacturing, with its president felt glad that his inventions prove beneficial to save lives. Z-VTOL is themed after SSSP's Jet VTOL from Ultraman, but uses the modified Space VTOL S217 Ikazuchi prop from Ultraman Mebius.
- Howa Type 89: A standard assault rifle that was similarly used by the Japan Self-Defense Forces.
- Spiner R-1 (スパイナーR1, Supainā Āru Wan): (Note: This name is a tribute to the high explosive Spiner from the episode 28 of Ultraseven and the interstellar ballistic missile R-1 from the episode 26 of the same series.) An intercontinental ballistic missile that was developed by the VTL's headquarter in Paris. Its impact range is estimated to be 10 km radius. This missile was launched towards the Tokyo Tower to stop Magatano-Orochi from awakening under Juggler's own advice but instead it played a pivotal part in the monster's own resurrection. The missile was also prophesied in Magatano-Orochi's awakening in the Pacific Records, symbolized as "an arrow like a bolt that strikes the ground".

== Main characters of The Origin Saga ==
=== War Deity ===
War Deity (戦神, Ikusagami) is an ancient war deity in Planet Kanon. Born from the Tree of Life, the War Deity functions as the protector of the Tree of Life from its own sibling, Queen Bezelb. According to the ancient prophecy, their destined encounter would cause the destruction of the universe itself. The War Deity's image is used as the royal insignia of Kanon, both royalty and its soldiers.

The War Deity's power was invoked twice by Amate in hopes of peacefully negotiating with the Queen Bezelb. Unfortunately both occasions turned out to be a trap in hopes of using the War Deity as a bomb to spread Kugutsu to the entire universe until the intervention of Orb and other Ultra Warriors saved her.

=== Planet Kanon ===
The characters of the Royal Planet Kanon (王立惑星カノン, Ōritsu Wakusei Kanon) appear exclusively in Ultraman Orb: The Origin Saga. The planet itself bears a giant tree called the "Tree of Life" (命の樹, Inochi no Ki), which supports all lives on said planet. In the past, the giant tree created both War Deity and the Queen Bezelb as symbols of light and darkness. When the Tree of Life was destroyed by Juggler, another seed on Earth regrows into the same tree, therefore sustaining its life force.

The War Deity is voiced by Saki Fukuda, Amate's actress and designed by Jun Takeuchi.

Royalty

- Amate's mother: Amate's unnamed mother and the previous queen of Kanon. She died in a failed attempt to stop Gargorgon through the power of War Deity, prompting her daughter to ask the monster in hopes of peacefully leaving the planet. She is portrayed by Coto Mukai (向井 琴, Mukai Koto).
- Amate (アマテ): The current queen of Planet Kanon who succeeded her mother. Despite her ideal for peace, she also inherited the War Deity's own powers and being the target for both Psychi and Raigo alike. She was spiritually connected to Shohei, a human on Earth that evolved after touching the seed from the Tree of Life. The Queen itself tricked Amate into transforming as the War Deity and almost killed her as a bomb until she was purified by the seed of the Tree of Life. Seeing a broken Psychi, Amate encouraged him to pursue his dreams despite the hardship he would face. Amate is portrayed by Saki Fukuda (福田 沙紀, Fukuda Saki). As a child, Amate is portrayed by Yuira Goto (後藤 由依良, Gotō Yuira).

Kanon's Royal Guard

The Kanon Royal Guards (カノン近衛兵, Kanon Konoe-hei) are guardsmen that protected the planet's royal bloodline, and concurrently the queen Amate herself.

- Shinra (シンラ): The captain of Kanon Royal Guards. He has a strong loyalty towards Amate, acts as an older brother figure to her and willingly protected her in a similar manner to Amate's late father. He was framed by Raigo in a staged assassination plot on Amate, causing him to be kidnapped by Psychi before his fellow guardsmen came to his aid. Alongside Ricca, he accompanies Amate to Earth and participated in the final battle against Bezelbs. He is portrayed by Yasuyuki Maekawa (前川 泰之, Maekawa Yasuyuki).
- Micott (ミコット, Mikotto): A member of Kanon Royal Guards. She is fascinated with Juggler's Serpent-Hearted Way, wanting to learn such swordsmanship and going as far as to address him "master". She loses her life when trying to fight against a man-sized Bezelb with Juggler's own katana, triggering his first transformation into Demon Form. When Ricca's Suzark was about to crash on Earth, Micott's spirit appeared and assisted her partner in steering the ship in a safer crash landing. She is portrayed by Ayane (文音).
- Ricca (リッカ, Rikka): Micott's partner. She has a strong faith in her captain Shinra. She is portrayed by Asuka Shibuya (渋谷 飛鳥, Shibuya Asuka)

Kanon Defense Army

- Raigo (ライゴウ, Raigō): The captain of Kanon Defense Army (カノン防衛軍, Kanon Bōei-gun). Seeing Shinra as an obstacle, Raigo framed him in an assassination plot against Amate to coerce the young queen into the War Deity. He is portrayed by Takaaki Enoki (榎木 孝明, Enoki Takaaki).
- Bugen (ブゲン): A high-ranking member of Kanon Defense Army, he is always shown beside Raigo. He is portrayed by Takeyuki Yue (湯江 健幸, Yue Takeyuki).

Mechas

- Suzark (スザーク号, Suzāku-gō): A spacecraft used by Kanon's Royal Guards and Defense Army. The ship was designed by Masato Inetsuki under the image of Japanese gate Torii.

Others

- Zanami (ザナミ): Raigo's pregnant wife. She is portrayed by Reika Kirishima (霧島 れいか, Kirishima Reika).

== Main characters of Ultraman Orb Chronicle ==
=== Chapter 2 ===
- Shorty (ショーティー, Shōtī): A young boy that lived in poverty in Jewel Planet Cobol (宝石惑星コボル, Hōseki Wakusei Koboru). After Gai caught him stealing, he decided to adopt the boy under his wing as Shorty assisted Gai in his adventures to collect the elements of Orbcalibur. In Chapter 3, Shorty died after disarming Juggler's Balloonga Bomb. His pendant was kept by Gai as a memorial and wears it in the TV series.
- Saramuni (サラムニ): The daughter of the Sirocco (シロッコ, Shirokko) tribe in Water Planet Nuok (水の惑星ヌオック, Mizu no Wakusei Nuokku). Tired of Sirocco's war with the Ghibli (ギブリ, Giburi) tribe, Saramuni awakened all three water demons that were sealed until Orb interfered and eliminated them after things went out of her control.

=== Chapter 3 ===
- Interstellar Federation (星間連盟, Seikan Renmei) is an organization that imprisoned the galaxy's worst criminals in Planet 484 (惑星484, Wakuseu Yonbyaku Hachi-jū Yon).

=== Chapter 4 ===
- Dana (ダーナ, Dāna): A former civilian of Ishtal Civilization (イシュタール文明, Ishutāru Bunmei) that Gai met when he first arrived on Earth in 1,800 BC. She helped Gai in investigating the mysterious cult Magasism before Maga-Tanothor's revival. With Ishtal in ruins, Dana and other survivors had scattered around the Earth. She died of old age, but not before recalling her memories of Ishtal to her relatives and meeting Gai for the last time.

=== Chapter 5 ===
- Natasha Romanova (ナターシャ・ロマノワ, Natāsha Romanowa): (Note: Initially credited as "Foreign girl" (異国の少女, Ikoku no shōjo)) The daughter of a Rupashika Empire (ルパシカ皇国, Rupashika Kōkoku) royalist, she moved to Rusalka (ルサールカ, Rusāruka) due to the civil war between the royalist and the revolutionary faction. She met Gai in 1908 while searching for herbs, treating his injuries after sustaining amnesia due to Orb's battle with Super C.O.V.. One month later, Natasha searched for Gai after he went missing and found him as Ultraman Orb himself, fighting Maga-Zetton. After being caught in the crossfire, this caused Orb to launch an all out attack that destroyed the entire forest, causing him to believe that Natasha was killed. In reality, she was rescued and healed by Juggler as she kept searching for Gai afterwards. With the Rupashika civil war approaches, she was forced to move to Japan and finally married a local Japanese man, with her descendants being Naomi and Keiko themselves. She kept a photo of Gai in a matryoshka doll as a memorial, which was soon given to Naomi by Keiko as her good luck charm. During Gai's escape from Zeppandon, her spirit delivered him a blank card that would become his original power after regaining faith on his own strength. Much of her traits, such as witnessing Orb's battle with Maga-Zetton were passed to her descendant Naomi. In the TV series cameos, she is portrayed by Vlada (ブラダ, Burada) of the idol group Hajirai Rescue JPN.
- Captain Mike Scudder (マイク・スカダー大尉, Maiku Sukadā-taii): An American agent of Secret Agency Sector 5 (秘密機関セクター5, Himitsu Kikan Sekutā Faibu) who investigate the mystery of Burlesque Triangle with Gai Kurenai in the 1950s. Gai's leather jacket is in fact a memorabilia from said man.

== Other Ultra Warriors ==
The Ultra Warriors (ウルトラ戦士, Urutora senshi) refer to past Ultraman from their original series and appearances.

=== Sealers of Lord Monsters ===
In the original series, several of them fought the Lord Monsters in the past and used their powers of Ultra Fusion Cards to seal them. In the present day, the power of these cards can be negated by Monster Cards which blocked their sealing property to reawaken Lord Monsters until Ultraman Orb stops them. He harvested the past Ultra Warriors' powers through the crystals left by destroyed Lord Monsters and added them to his strength. Even if the cards only symbolizes their power, Gai always had the tendency to treat them with great respect. It is also shown that Gai is capable of using the powers of the Ultra Fusion Cards. During the final episode of the original series, they were materialized from their respective cards to assist Orb Origin in his final battle against Magatano-Orochi.

Each of Ultra Warriors' Ultra Fusion Card bears different elements represented by a kanji character on their Color Timer, symbolizing their traits and specialties.

- Ultraman (ウルトラマン, Urutoraman): An Ultraman that fought and sealed the Light Lord Monster, Maga-Zetton. His card bears the element Light (ヒカリ（光）, Hikari). For more of Ultraman's history and exploits, see here.
- Ultraman Tiga (ウルトラマンティガ, Urutoraman Tiga): An Ultraman that presumably fought and sealed the Darkness Lord Monster, Maga-Tanothor. His card was already acquired by Gai Kurenai before he would fight Maga-Zetton. (off-screen) His card bears the element Ancient (イニシエ（古）, Inishie). For more of his history and exploits, see here.
- Ultraman Mebius (ウルトラマンメビウス, Urutoraman Mebiusu): An Ultraman that fought and sealed the Wind Lord Monster, Maga-Basser. His card was acquired by Gai Kurenai after Orb defeated the sealed Lord Monster. His card bears the element Sword (ツルギ（剣）, Tsurugi). For more of Mebius' history and exploits, see here.
- Ultraman Taro (ウルトラマンタロウ, Urutoraman Tarō): An Ultraman that fought and sealed the Earth Lord Monster, Maga-Grand King. His activities in the past were recorded by the Pacific Records and his Ultra Fusion Card was acquired by Gai Kurenai after Orb defeated the Lord Monster. His card bears the element Fire (ヒ（火）, Hi). For more of Taro's history and exploits, see here.
- Ultraman Jack (ウルトラマンジャック, Urutoraman Jakku): An Ultraman that fought and sealed the Water Lord Monster, Maga-Jappa. His Ultra Fusion Card was acquired by Gai Kurenai after Orb defeated the Lord Monster, bearing the element Shield (タテ（盾）, Tate). For more of his history and exploits, see here.
- Ultraman Zero (ウルトラマンゼロ, Urutoraman Zero; Movie): An Ultraman that fought and sealed the Fire Lord Monster, Maga-Pandon. His card bears the element Slash (ザン（斬）, Zan). For more of Ultraman Zero's history and exploits, see here.
- Zoffy (ゾフィー, Zofī): The sealer of Maga-Orochi, his card was destroyed by Ultraman Belial's Ultra Fusion Card in hopes of reawakening the destroyer. The card was recreated by Tamayura for Gai to use it with Belial's card, therefore acquiring the form Thunder Breastar. His card bears the element Merits (クン（勲）, Kun). In Ultra Fight Orb, he joined Jack and Seven in supporting Orb and Zero against Reibatos' campaign. He is reprised by Hideyuki Tanaka (田中 秀幸, Tanaka Hideyuki).

=== Supporting characters in The Origin Saga ===
- Shin Asuka/Ultraman Dyna (アスカ・シン／ウルトラマンダイナ, Asuka Shin/Urutoraman Daina): Originally a member of TPC's Super GUTS, he went on travelling in the galaxy after saving his world from the threat of Gransphia. Having sensed a disturbance made by Psychi and his army of Bezelbs, he assisted Ultraman Orb, the Ultra Warrior of that galaxy and asked Musashi/Ultraman Cosmos to support him in the battle. As his alter-ego Ultraman Dyna, he is known for the ability to Type Change (タイプチェンジ, Taipu Chenji) into any preferred forms, such as Flash Type (フラッシュタイプ, Furasshu Taipu) and Strong Type (ストロングタイプ, Sutorongu Taipu). His role is reprised by Takeshi Tsuruno (つるの 剛士, Tsuruno Takeshi). As Ultrama Dyna, his Ultra Fusion Card made a cameo appearance in episode 8 of original series, bearing the element Light.
- Musashi Haruno/Ultraman Cosmos (春野 ムサシ／ウルトラマンコスモス, Haruno Musashi/Urutoraman Kosumosu): The current protector of Planet Juran (惑星ジュラン, Wakusei Juran), he was called by Shin Asuka, who requested his help once more to deal with the threat of Psychi and his Bezelb army. He also made a telepathic contact with the Planet Kanon queen Amate, supporting her ideal for peace without conflicts. As Ultraman Cosmos, his basic form is known by the name Luna Mode (ルナモード, Runa Mōdo). His role is reprised by Taiyo Sugiura (杉浦 太陽, Sugiura Taiyō). Ultraman Cosmos' Ultra Fusion Card made a cameo appearance in episode 9 of the original series, bearing the element Healing (イヤシ（癒）, Iyashi).
- Gamu Takayama/Ultraman Gaia (高山 我夢／ウルトラマンガイア, Takayama Gamu/Urutoraman Gaia): A genius fighter that acquired a doctorate in quantum physics at the age of 17 years old and had fought alongside Fujimiya to protect the Earth against the forces of Radical Destruction Bringer. When Psychi sent his Bezelb to Shohei Moriwaki World's, Gamu and Fujimiya was sent by the Shohei World's will to protect the Tree of Life, ultimately joining forces with Orb. His card appeared at episode 16 of the original series, bearing the element Earth. He is reprised by Takeshi Yoshioka (吉岡 毅志, Yoshioka Takeshi).
- Hiroya Fujimiya/Ultraman Agul (藤宮 博也／ウルトラマンアグル, Fujimiya Hiroya/Urutoraman Aguru): A scientist that assisted Gamu/Ultraman Gaia as Agul when fighting against the Radical Destruction Bringer in the past. Fujimiya assisted Gamu again in the fight against Psychi's Bezelbs, and asserted the mad scientist of his twisted ideal for peace. His card appeared at episode 18 of the original series, bearing the element Water (ミズ（水）, Mizu). He is reprised by Hassei Takano (高野 八誠, Takano Hassei).

=== Other Supporting Ultra Warriors ===
- Ultraman Belial (ウルトラマンベリアル, Urutoraman Beriaru): His card bears the element Darkness (ヤミ（闇）, Yami). For more of Ultraman Belial' history and exploits, see here.
- Dan Moroboshi/Ultraseven (モロボシ・ダン／ウルトラセブン, Moroboshi Dan/Urutorasebun; Movie): His card bears the element Slash. For more of Ultraseven's history and exploits, see here.
- Ultraman Ginga (ウルトラマンギンガ, Urutoraman Ginga; Movie): An Ultraman who was captured by Murnau as one of her space jewels. His card bears the element Light. His voice is reprised by Takuya Negishi (根岸 拓哉, Negishi Takuya).
- Ultraman Victory (ウルトラマンビクトリー, Urutoraman Bikutorī; Movie): Ginga's partner, who was also captured by Murnau as one of her space jewels. His card bears the element Earth (ツチ（土）, Tsuchi). His voice is reprised by Kiyotaka Uji (宇治 清高, Uji Kiyotaka).
- Ultraman X (ウルトラマンエックス, Urutoraman Ekkusu; Movie): An Ultraman who was separated from his host Daichi after an attack from a mysterious enemy. He inhabited the X Devizer, which landed in the SSP's base while asking for them and Gai/Ultraman Orb for help to relocate Daichi. But while doing so, he was quickly captured by Murnau's followers and turned into a space jewel for her collection. During combat, X is capable of utilizing MonsArmor (モンスアーマー, Monsuāmā) with the help of his host Daichi. His Fusion Card bears the element Armor (ヨロイ（鎧）, Yoroi). His voice is reprised by Yuichi Nakamura (中村 悠一, Nakamura Yūichi).
  - Daichi Ozora (大空 大地, Ōzora Daichi; Movie): Ultraman X's human host, he was separated from them due to a mysterious enemy attack. His role is reprised by Kensuke Takahashi (高橋 健介, Takahashi Kensuke).
- Ultraman Geed (ウルトラマンジード, Ultraman Jīdo; Fight Orb): An Ultra Warrior from Orb's succeeding series. He was shown at the end of Ultra Fight Orb and decimated Reibatos in an instant.

== Antagonists ==
=== Psychi ===
Psychi (サイキ) is an Alien Wraith (レイフ星人, Reifu Seijin) scientist and is the main antagonist of Ultraman Orb: The Origin Saga. After grieving over the loss of his parents in a war, Psychi met and was manipulated by the Queen into assisting her with spreading the Kugutsu to the entire universe while seeking the Tree of Life's fruits in hopes of excluding himself from the infection. On Earth, after witnessing the Queen injured as a result of betraying him, Psychi combined with her via Partel into Psyqueen and effectively relieved him from the need of the Tree of Life. Before Psyqueen's destruction, Partel saved him by separating the fusion while Gai highlighted the errors of his ways.

Psychi is portrayed by Izumi Motoya (和泉 元彌). As a child, Psychi is portrayed by Shouta Ikoma (生駒 星汰, Ikoma Shōta).

=== Partel ===
Partel (パーテル, Pāteru) is Psychi's AI that assist him in his plans and acted as his sole companion. While played a pivotal role in combining her creator and Queen Bezelb into Psyqueen, she saved him in the last minute and deactivated after taking a hit from an incoming rubble meant for Shinra and Ricca.

Partel is voiced by Riho Iida (飯田 里穂, Iida Riho), who is the voice actress for Aki Miyashita/Agira in Kaiju Girls. As the character is her first non-human voice role, Riho expressed her excitement for the role and wished to portray Partel in a more attractive manner in the future.

=== Queen Bezelb ===
Space Devil Queen Bezelb (宇宙悪魔 クイーンベゼルブ, Uchū Akuma Kuīn Bezerubu) is the actual antagonist of Ultraman Orb: The Origin Saga. Long ago when the Tree of Life disperse its fruits to outer space, the Queen was born alongside her sibling War Deity. As the antithesis of her own sibling, the Queen was meant to destroy the Tree of Life and erase free will from outer space, causing affected life forms to slowly die and civilizations perish. To that end she manipulated Psychi into his cooperation and eventually Amate into transforming as the War Deity. The infection of her sibling would cause her Kugutsu to spread across the space. Although having outright abandoned Psychi, the two were combined by Partel into Psyqueen (サイクイーン, Saikuīn) before her death by the Ultra Warriors.

The Queen Bezelb's main ability is to manipulate her own children and victims of Kugutsu, rapidly grows in strength when infected victims tend to win on a fight. She is capable of taking an upright position from her hunching state, symbolizing her constant mutation. In addition, her cries can also be misinterpreted by others as a cry for help.

- Space Devil Bezelb (宇宙悪魔 ベゼルブ, Uchū Akuma Bezerubu) are the Queen's own children. Acting on behalf of Psychi and the Queen, they spread the poison called Kugutsu (クグツ), (Note: The word "Kugutsu" is a Japanese for "marionette" (傀儡, kugutsu).) which carried in their stinger tail. Once injected, the victims will be enslaved, either following the Bezelb's command or forced to fight against one another. The winning competitor of the Kugutsu infection would simultaneously cause the Queen Bezelb to grow in strength. The poison itself cannot be exorcised by Cosmos Luna Mode's Luna Extract and can only be removed by the seed of Planet Kanon's Tree of Life.

The Bezelbs are designed by Hiroshi Maruyama, a freelance designer that previously affiliated to Tsuburaya Productions until 2008.

=== Kugutsu Monsters ===
Kugutsu Monsters (クグツ怪獣, Kugutsu Kaijū) are monsters under infections by Bezelb in The Origin Saga.

- Berserk Monster Kugutsu Arstron (凶暴怪獣 クグツアーストロン, Kyōbō Kaijū Kugutsu Āsutoron; 1, 12): A monster on Planet Zain (惑星ザイン, Wakusei Zain), Arstron was forced to fight against King Guesra upon infection and wins, causing both the monster and Queen Bezelb to increase in strength. First appeared in episode 1 of Return of Ultraman.
- Sea Monster Kugutsu King Guesra (海獣 クグツキングゲスラ, Kaijū Kugutsu Kingu Gesura; 1): A monster on Planet Zain, King Guesra was forced to fight against Arstron upon infection and loses from the battle. Prior to its original appearance in the web series, King Guesra's Monster Card appeared in episode 6 of original series as one of the sets required by Juggler to create a "Five of a Kind" poker hand. First appeared in Superior Ultraman 8 Brothers.
- Great Space Monster Kugutsu Bemstar (宇宙大怪獣 クグツベムスター, Uchū Dai Kaijū Kugutsu Bemusutā; 2, 3): A monster on Planet Rurin (惑星ルーリン, Wakusei Rūrin), who attacked its inhabitants and fought Ultraman Orb before leaving to outer space. Bemstar's main attack involves Bemstar Beam (ベムスタービーム, Bemusutā Bīmu) and the use of Suction Attractor Spout (吸引アトラクター・スパウト, Kyūin Atorakutā Supauto) on its stomach. Prior to its appearance in the spinoff series, Bemstar's Monster Card was shown in Juggler's possession in episode 10 of the original series, using its absorption power to survive his assassination from Nagus. First appeared in episode 18 of Return of Ultraman.
- Volcanic Bird Monster Kugutsu Birdon (火山怪鳥 クグツバードン, Kazan Kaichō Kugutsu Bādon; 3): A monster on Planet Zain that assisted several Bezelbs in fighting against Ultraman Orb and Ultraman Dyna. After the Bezelbs had been dealt with, Birdon flew away after being flicked on its head by Dyna Strong Type. First appeared in episode 18 of Ultraman Taro.
- One-Horned Terrible-Monster Kugutsu Vakishim (一角超獣 クグツバキシム, Ikkaku Chōjū Kugutsu Bakishimu; 5, 6, 12): Sent alongside Verokron to fight against Cosmos, they were soon joined by the Bezelb army in Kanon to attack the royal palace. Vakishim's main abilities are Vulcan Fire (バルカン連射, Barukan Rensha) and Horn Missile (角ミサイル, Tsuno Misairu). First appeared in episode 3 of Ultraman Ace.
- Missile Terrible-Monster Kugutsu Verokron (ミサイル超獣 クグツベロクロン, Misairu Chōjū Kugutsu Berokuron; 5, 6): Sent alongside Vakishim to fight against Cosmos, they were soon joined by the Bezelb army in Kanon to attack the royal palace. Verokron's main ability is Zenmestro Attack (ゼンメストロアタック, Zenmesutoro Atakku), launching various missiles towards its opponent. First appeared in episode 1 of Ultraman Ace.

=== Maga-Orochi ===
Great Lord Monster Maga-Orochi (大魔王獣 マガオロチ, Dai Maō-jū Maga Orochi; 11, 12) is the main antagonist of Ultraman Orb, representing as Chapter 6 of Ultraman Orb Chronicle. Hailed from the Monster Galaxy (モンスター銀河, Monsutā Ginga), Maga-Orochi consumed various planets in its path. After landing on Earth, Orochi created six other Lord Monsters and Orochi kidnapped Princess Tamayura before it was sealed by Zoffy, permanently trapped in its egg state. Although Gai believed that Jugglus' efforts to awaken it were thwarted after all six of the Lord Monster had been "destroyed", he simply used their cards and with Belial's card, the seal made by Zoffy's Ultra Fusion Card broke, allowing Maga-Orochi to reawaken once more. Orb tried to stop it but was quickly defeated and went to sleep afterwards. After waking up and resuming its reign of terror, Maga-Orochi soon destroyed Princess Tamayura, Gai to transform into Orb's Thunder Breastar form. Unlike before, Maga-Orochi found itself weakened by both Belial and Zoffy's powers before being obliterated by Zedcium Ray. Its severed tail was salvaged by Juggler in the formation of Zeppandon, which ultimately led to his own downfall when said tail carried the Orbcalibur which Gai retrieved to assume Orb Origin. As it seemed that Maga-Orochi had died, in truth it was actually a juvenile and eventually left its body to the Earth's crust as part of its life cycle. The monster spent its entire time eating the grounds nutrients and its presence caused multiple monsters to leave Japan and alien saucers to depart from Earth. After being tricked by Juggler into firing the Spiner R1 missile, VTL Squad accidentally assisted Orochi's revival into Giga Lord Monster Magatano-Orochi (超大魔王獣 マガタノオロチ, Chō Dai Maō-jū Magatano Orochi; 24, 25). Orb tries to fight against the monster but was defeated after both of his strongest forms, Thunder Breastar and Orb Origin proven ineffective, as well as being shot in his own Color Timer. Orb faced the monster again, this time with the help of Juggler and the SSP/VTL exposed Magatano-Orochi's weakness, allowing him to channel the power of past Ultra Warriors to defeat the monster once and for all.

By itself, Maga-Orochi travels across other planets by turning itself into an egg called as Maga-Soul (マガ魂, Maga Tamashī) and creates other Lord Monsters by tapping into Earth elements. Maga-Orochi's main attack is Maga Thunderclap (マガ迅雷, Maga Jinrai), launching a bolt of lightning from its mouth. As Magatano-Orochi, the monster gained access to the signature abilities of past Lord Monster in addition to its own attack, Magatano Thunderclap (マガタノ迅雷, Magatano Jinrai). Its main weakness is a wounded spot on the right side of its lower jaw, which was a result of Maga-Orochi crushing the sacred tree in Kamio Park while sending off its energies underground, causing certain part of the monster to be defect.

=== Lord Monsters ===
The Lord Monsters formed in a hexagonal formation: (Clockwise) Maga-Tanothor, Maga-Pandon, Maga-Grand King, Maga-Zetton, Maga-Jappa and Maga-Basser. (Center) Maga-Orochi

Lord Monsters (魔王獣, Maō-jū) were antagonists that appeared in the original series. Their origin traces back to the ancient past where Maga-Orochi's egg reached the Earth and gave birth when its power taps into the Earth elements. Due to being the "distorted personification of Earth elements", they possessed the ability to change nature, hence past Ultras choose to seal them instead of killing to preserve the Earth. They were awakened by Jugglus through the use of his Dark Ring and Monster Cards and possess Maga Crystals on their heads which allowed Gai to claim the corresponding Ultra Fusion Cards should they be defeated but at the same time, it also allowed Jugglus to claim theirs in hopes of awakening Maga-Orochi.

To awaken a sealed Lord Monster, Jugglus need to send in Monster Cards of the similar attribute as a counteract to the sealed Ultra Warrior energy and to feed them with the cards' powers. Most of these monsters are original to the series, while others are reincarnation of monsters from past Ultra Series. Due to them being present in the past, their activities were recorded in the present day by the Pacific Records (太平風土記, Taihei Fudoki).

- Darkness Lord Monster Maga-Tanothor (闇ノ魔王獣 マガタノゾーア, Yami no Maō-jū Maga Tanozōa; Chapter 4): A Lord Monster that was sealed by Ultraman Tiga. Upon his first arrival on Earth, Juggler awakened Maga-Tanothor in 1800 BC towards the Ishtal civilization and founded Magasism, a cult that praises Maga-Tanothor. Upon being defeated by Ultraman Orb, Tiga's card was collected by Gai while Maga-Tanothor's card was picked by Juggler. The result of Maga-Tanothor's appearance had turned Ishtal into the infamous Mohenjo-Daro, being the foundation of "ancient nuclear warfare" theory made by modern researchers. Maga-Tanothor's powers are Maga Darkness (マガ冥闇, Maga Meian) and summoning tentacles as whips and constrictions, with the latter ability was demonstrated by Magatano-Orochi in the series proper. Maga-Tanothor is a tribute to Gatanothor from episodes 51 and 52 of Ultraman Tiga.
- Light Lord Monster Maga-Zetton (光ノ魔王獣 マガゼットン, Hikari no Maō-jū Maga Zetton; Chapter 5-1, 1 (Orb)): A Lord Monster that was sealed by Ultraman. Maga-Zetton's main attack is Maga Light Bullet (マガ光弾, Maga Kōdan) energy beam and Maga Teleport Attack (マガテレポートアタック, Maga Terepōto Atakku). Through the cards of Kingsaurus II, Super C.O.V. and Pris-Ma, Juggler reawakened it in Rusalka and fought Orb in the past while using his true form. Orb eliminated the monster and claimed Ultraman's card but the ensuing battle made him believe to have killed his own friend Natasha. Maga-Zetton's Maga Light Bullet was among the powers of Lord Monster to be used by Magatano-Orochi on the series finale. Maga-Zetton is a tribute to Zetton from episode 39 of Ultraman.
- Wind Lord Monster Maga-Basser (風ノ魔王獣 マガバッサー, Kaze no Maō-jū Maga Bassā; 1): A Lord Monster that was sealed by Ultraman Mebius and laid dormant within the ionosphere of North Arctic until it was awakened by Jugglus via Peguila's card. It possess a pair of giant wings, which allows it to create Maga Shockwave (マガ衝撃波, Maga Shōgekiha), a gust of wind and creating butterfly effect through Maga Storm (マガ嵐, Maga Arashi) cyclones. Having changed the world climate in its flight, the monster made its way to Japan and fought Orb before being destroyed by Sperion Ray. Gai claimed Ultraman Mebius' card from its Maga Crystal while Jugglus claimed Maga-Basser's card. Maga-Basser's Maga Storm was shown among the Lord Monster powers utilized by Magatano-Orochi.
- Earth Lord Monster Maga-Grand King (土ノ魔王獣 マガグランドキング, Tsuchi no Maō-jū Maga Gurando Kingu; 2): A Lord Monster that was sealed by Ultraman Taro and laid dormant under the city by a feng shui system. Maga-Grand King's body is heavily armored and has the ability to create earthquakes with Maga Flash (マガ一閃, Maga Issen) and launching drilling laser beam Maga Perforation (マガ穿孔, Maga Senkō). However, the laser beam cannot be simultaneously used alongside its heavy armor, based on a Chinese proverb. Jugglus awaken this monster through the use of Telesdon, Antlar, Gomora and Golza, which simultaneously disrupt the qi of the feng shui seal and awaken it. Ultraman Orb faced the Demon King Beast upon its awakening and finds himself at disadvantage due to its thick armor and its destructive beam. Discovering that the beam is reflectable, Orb used his shield to trick Maga-Grand King into creating a hole on its chest before using it as an opening to launch his Sperion Ray, destroying it from within. Gai claimed Ultraman Taro's card from its Maga Crystal while Jugglus claimed Maga-Grand King's card. Maga-Grand King's Maga-Perforation and sinkhole creation was among the Lord Monster powers utilized by Magatano-Orochi in the final episode of Ultraman Orb. Maga-Grand King is a tribute to Grand King from Ultraman Story.
- Water Lord Monster Maga-Jappa (水ノ魔王獣 マガジャッパ, Mizu no Maō-jū Maga Jappa; 3): A Lord Monster that was sealed by Ultraman Jack and laid dormant under Okunara Lake. In the present day, Maga-Jappa was awakened by Jugglus and polluted the water supply in the city for weeks, causing it to emit an awful stench. Maga-Jappa's main attacks are turning himself invisible, using Maga Shower (マガ水流, Maga Suiryū) by launching high-pressure water stream from its nose, Maga Suction (マガ吸引, Maga Kyūin) vacuum from both of its arms and exhaling terrible odor gas called Maga Odor (マガ臭気, Maga Shūki). As Ultraman Orb can neither harm the monster in Spacium Zeperion, he utilizes Burnmite, using the form's flame abilities to counter Maga-Jappa and finally ending it with the Stobium Dynamite. Gai claimed Ultraman Jack's card from its Maga Crystal while Jugglus claimed Maga-Jappa's card. Maga-Jappa's Maga Odor was among the original Lord Monster powers exhibited by Magatano-Orochi in the series finale. According to Yuji Kobayashi and Takao Nakano, Maga-Jappa's costume was modified from Zoa-Muruchi in Ultraman Mebius.
- Fire Lord Monster Maga-Pandon (火ノ魔王獣 マガパンドン, Hi no Maō-jū Maga Pandon; 4): A Lord Monster that was sealed by Ultraman Zero. In the present day, Maga-Pandon was awakened by Jugglus and emitted a strong heatwave to the city. Maga-Pandon's main attacks are Maga-Fireball (マガ火球, Maga Kakyū) which encases the monster in a fireball that is able to emit a heatwave that exceeded the temperature of 40 °C and Maga-Fireball Flame Bullets (マガ火玉火炎弾, Maga Hidama Kaen-dan), launching rapid fireball attacks. As the Maga-Fireball was thick enough to sustain Orb's attacks, the Ultra moved it out from the atmosphere before his Color Timer runs out. While still emitting heatwave to the city, VTL Squad tried to attack with cooling missiles until returned to Earth before Ultraman Orb appeared and uses Burnmite to counter it. Soon, he resumes Spacium Zeperion and launched Sperion Ray to Pandon before it was destroyed from a long struggle sustaining the attack. Gai claimed Ultraman Zero's card from its Maga Crystal while Jugglus claimed Maga-Pandon's card, at the same time completing his collection of Lord Monster Monster Cards. Soon, Maga-Pandon's Maga-Fireball Flame Bullets and the ability to manipulate extreme heats were utilized by Magatano-Orochi in the series finale of Ultraman Orb. Maga-Pandon is a tribute to Pandon/Modified Pandon from episodes 48 and 49 of Ultraseven.
- Combined Lord Monster Zeppandon (合体魔王獣 ゼッパンドン, Gattai Maō-jū Zeppandon; 16, 17, Movie): A monster resulted from the combination of Zetton and Pandon's cards, as well as that of Maga-Orochi's tail. Jugglus controlled this monster from within and managed to defeat Gai/Ultraman Orb in all of his three forms in Rusalka before the latter escaped. Zeppandon appeared on Japan the next day, fighting Ultraman Orb in Thunder Breastar but while it seemed that the monster is about to win again, Orb's requirement of his original form Orb Origin turn the tides of the battle, causing both monster and the Dark Ring to be destroyed. Zeppandon retained all of its components' attacks, such as Zetton's teleportation, Pandon's projectile-catching reflex and Maga-Orochi's Maga Thunderclap. Its original attacks are Zeppandon Attack Fire Bullet (ゼッパンドン撃炎弾, Zeppandon Gekien-dan) and Zeppandon Shield (ゼッパンドンシールド, Zeppandon Shīrudo).

=== Planetary Invasion Coalition ===
Planetary Invasion Coalition (惑星侵略連合, Wakusei Shinryaku Rengō) is a mysterious group which bends on conquering the Earth in episode 6 to 20 of the original series. The group's main transportation is a twin-conjoined saucer (based on Alien Metron's saucer from episode 8 of Ultraseven) which had the function to trap people in a dimensional distortion. They collaborated with Jugglus Juggler but eventually went defunct after his betrayal and Tarde's destruction by Orb.

Members

- Malicious Alien Alien Mefilas "Nostra" (悪質宇宙人 メフィラス星人 ノストラ, Akushitsu Uchūjin Mefirasu Seijin Nosutora; 6, 9, 10): Also called "Don Nostra" (ドン・ノストラ, Don Nosutora) by his associates, he is the leader of the Planetary Invasion Coalition and is in possession of Ultraman Belial's Ultra Fusion Card, to which he replied as "their ultimate trump card". He also planned on betraying Jugglus, having set his sight on the latter's Lord Monster Monster Cards despite having gained the man as their trusted accomplice. This betrayal was quickly carried out by having Jugglus controlling Nagus' Black King while Nagus prepared to attack him by chance. Although the plan succeeded and Nostra gaining the Lord Monster cards, Jugglus was revealed to have faked his death through Bemstar's card and quickly slay Nostra in his true form. Aside from his possession of Belial's Card, Nostra can also unleash Grip Beam (グリップビーム, Gurippu Bīmu) attack from his right hand. He is voiced by Hiroki Yasumoto (安元 洋貴, Yasumoto Hiroki), who previously voiced Sly of the Dark Magic, another Alien Mefilas from Ultra Zero Fight and is a tribute to Alien Mefilas from episode 33 of Ultraman.
- Assassin Alien Alien Nackle "Nagus" (暗殺宇宙人 ナックル星人 ナグス, Ansatsu Uchūjin Nakkuru Seijin Nagusu; 6, 9, 10): An alien that was responsible for disappearances of humans that trespasses the group's forest hideout. When SSP and Shibukawa intruded their hideout, he and his henchman tried to hunt them but they managed to escape with the help of Princess Tamayura and Gai's interference. His main weapon is a blaster gun and has a pair of henchmen that appeared as men in black suit and sunglasses. He is also in possession of a set of Monster Cards, with his strongest one being Black King. When Nostra finally decided to have Jugglus eliminated, Nagus quickly carried out the order to kill him while he was controlling Black King. Following the "successful" assassination plan, Nagus and Nostra celebrated Jugglus demise while suggesting to use the Lord Monster and Ultraman Belial's Cards for an All Monsters Attack (怪獣総進撃, Kaijū Sōshingeki) (Note: This name is a tribute to the episode 1 of The Return of Ultraman, as part of Find the Subtitle of episode 10.) operation until Jugglus killed Nagus by stabbing on his back. He is voiced by Tetsuo Kishi (岸 哲生, Kishi Tetsuo) and is a tribute to Alien Nackle from episodes 39 and 40 of Return of Ultraman.
- Hallucination Alien Alien Metron "Tarde" (幻覚宇宙人 メトロン星人 タルデ, Genkaku Uchūjin Metoron Seijin Tarude; 6, 9, 13, 20): An alien who tried to plan an invasion by using hallucinogenic cigrattes but failed after the declining number of smokers. He is also doubtful on Jugglus' membership into their group, having once affiliated to the side of light. His skepticism would be true later on, being absent when Jugglus assassinated Nostra and Nagus. Seeing how Jugglus have been using the group for his own agenda, Tarde swears vengeance upon the former and equipped with a pair of Round Launchers (ラウンドランチャー, Raundo Ranchā), allowing him to initiate Shooting Barrage (シューティングバラージ, Shūtingu Barāji) attack. He tried to hunt Juggler on his own and warned Gai not to interfere with his conquest but fights him when accidentally placing Naomi's life in danger. He was killed by Orb Origin after having a final glance over the sunset. He is voiced by Kōichi Toshima (外島 孝一, Toshima Kōichi) and is a tribute to Alien Metron from episode 8 of Ultraseven.

Agents

- Transforming Phantom Alien Zetton "Maddock" (変身怪人 ゼットン星人 マドック, Henshin Kaijin Zetton Seijin Madokku; 5, 21): Wanting to earn a reputation by killing Orb, Maddock first kidnap Naomi by disguising as a schoolgirl named Matoko (真渡子) and had her as a bait to lure Gai. Once Gai arrived, he launched Hyper Zetton Deathscythe for Orb to fight until the monster was defeated, forcing him to fend off against Gai and defeated after being hit by a blast from his own rifle. In his last breath, he revealed his true motives and stated that the Earth is still in danger before reducing to bubbles. It was soon revealed that he created an artificial life form named Maya for his consciousness to inhabit but soon fell into an internal conflict over the control of her body. Eventually, he was destroyed by Maya at the expense of her own memories. He was voiced by Kenta Matsumoto (松本 健太, Matsumoto Kenta) and played by Moeko Ikeda (池田 萌子, Ikeda Moeko) when disguising as Matoko. He is a tribute to Alien Zetton from episode 39 of Ultraman.

Monsters

- Space Dinosaur Hyper Zetton Deathscythe (宇宙恐竜 ハイパーゼットンデスサイス, Uchū Kyōryū Haipā Zetton Desusaisu; 5): A monster under ownership by Alien Zetton Maddock, who wanted to use it to defeat Gai/Ultraman Orb. During its arrival on Earth, it hid inside a factory by shrinking itself to 5 meters. After successfully capturing Naomi and baiting Gai towards him, Maddock unleashed Hyper Zetton to its rampaging spree. With Hyper Zetton knows of Orb's past movements, the latter assumed Hurricane Slash, catching on par with the monster's quick teleportation and finally put an end to it with the Big Bang Thrust. Although based on Imago Hyper Zetton from Ultraman Saga, Hyper Zetton Deathscythe possess sickles on each arms (a distinction from its original incarnation) while retaining attacks from its predecessor such as Dark Fireball (暗黒火球, Ankoku Kakyū), Hyper Zetton Teleport (ハイパーゼットンテレポート, Haipā Zetton Terepōto) and Hyper Zetton Barrier (ハイパーゼットンバリヤー, Haipā Zetton Bariyā).
  - Hyper Zetton Deathscythe (Reserver) (ハイパーゼットンデスサイス（リザーバー）, Haipā Zetton Desusaisu (Rizābā); 21): The second Hyper Zetton Deathscythe, who was manipulated by Maya/Maddock's Spare into attacking the suburban area but was interrupted each time due to Maya trying to rebel against her creator. When Maddock gained full control over her, Hyper Zetton went rampant and fought against Orb but was weakened after Maya broke the bracelet controller device and for Orb Thunder Breastar to finish it.
- Giant-Ant Terrible-Monster Aribunta (大蟻超獣 アリブンタ, Ōari Chōjū Aribunta; 6): Summoned by Jugglus via its Monster Card, Aribunta was used as a distraction for members of Planetary Invasion Coalition to escape. Ultraman Orb battled against Aribunta in all of his three forms and finally put an end to the monster by using Hurricane Slash's Trident Slash. First appeared in episode 5 of Ultraman Ace.
- Brutal Space Monster Kelbim (宇宙凶険怪獣 ケルビム, Uchū Kyōken Kaijū Kerubimu; 9): Summoned by Jugglus via its Monster Card, Kelbim was used to eliminate Alien Babarue Babaryu due to his wish of redeeming from his evil path. Although managed to weaken Babaryu as Imitation Ultraman Orb, the real Ultraman soon appeared and utilized Hurricane Slash to put an end to said monster. Cherubim's main attack is Ballistic Exclusive Spit (弾道エクスクルーシブスピット, Dandō Ekusukurūshibu Supitto), launching a fireball from its mouth. First appeared in episode 4 of Ultraman Mebius.
- Bodyguard Monster Black King (用心棒怪獣 ブラックキング, Yōjinbō Kaijū Burakku Kingu; 10): Nagus' Monster Card, which Don Nostra gave to Jugglus in his mission to defeat Ultraman Orb while at the same time planning to assassinate the latter just for his Monster Cards. Black King was summoned and controlled by Jugglus to fight Orb until he was "killed" by Nagus, who later reclaimed Black King and controlled it before Orb defeated the monster with his Stobium Dynamite. Black King's main attack involves the use of its durable skin and launches flame attack called Hell Magma (ヘルマグマ, Heru Maguma). First appeared in episodes 37 and 38 of Return of Ultraman.

=== Galactron ===
Civil Judgementer Galactron (シビルジャッジメンター ギャラクトロン, Shibiru Jajjimentā Gyarakutoron; 14, 15, Movie) is robot created by Gillvalis, which had been responsible for attacking multiple dimensions due to its warlike status. During its arrival on Earth, Galactron received its name from Naomi, who combined it under the proposed names Galaxy Dragon (ギャラクシードラゴン, Gyarakushī Doragon) by Jetta and Salvatron (サルヴァトロン, Saruvatoron) by Shin. After landing besides the Kofune Manufacturing, VTL and the warehouse's crew decided to analyze the robot, but said robot at the same time analyzing the Earth and its cultures. Once completed its task, it awoke and captured Naomi to be used as its speech interpreter, trying to reset Earth due to finding it corrupted, as well as believing how the planet's ecosystem being wrong and contemplating to eliminate all lifeforms. Orb tried to attack the robot but was quickly overpowered and defeated instantly when it pierced towards his body. Seeing the collateral damage Galactron made, Gai had no choice but to use Thunder Breastar and wreak the robot apart with his immense power, which almost cost Naomi her own life. Gai speculated that Galactron's invention was deemed a failure by his creators, thus prompting them to perform illegal dumping towards other dimensions.

In Ultraman Orb The Movie, Galactron was rebuilt and modified by Murnau as one of her minions, now renamed as Strange Mechanical Revised Dragon Galactron (奇機械改竜 ギャラクトロン, Ki Kikai Kairyū Gyarakutoron) which served her purpose to turn everything into jewellery. This machine fought against Ultraman Orb (Orb Origin) and Ultraman Zero before being defeated.

Galactron's main weapons are Galactron Shaft (ギャラクトロンシャフト, Gyarakutoron Shafuto) capture claw which took the appearance of its "braid", Galactron Blade (ギャラクトロンブレード, Gyarakutoron Burēdo) sword from its left arm that can be extended in a manner of a spear and a catcher claw on its right arm that can be ejected and remotely controlled as a drone. Its strongest attack is Galactron Spark (ギャラクトロンスパーク, Gyarakutoron Supāku), which is capable of decimating a countryside with relative ease. After being rebuilt by Murnau, Galactron's chest now wielded the ability to fire Galactron Gem Spark (ギャラクトロンジェムスパーク, Gyarakutoron Jemu Supāku), turning everything on its firing range into jewels.

=== Murnau ===
Space Witch Thief Murnau (宇宙魔女賊 ムルナウ, Uchū Majo Zoku Murunau) is the main antagonist of Ultraman Orb the Movie. An evil space sorceress, she fancied upon pretty things and added them to her collection by turning them into jewellery. Her first appearance is chronologically in Chapter 2-1 of Ultraman Orb Chronicle, conspiring with Dr. Jiggle to scare the entire residence of Planet Cobol and claim its supply of jewels. She escaped after Gai foil her plans, leaving behind the Earth jewel for Orbcalibur.

In Orb the Movie, having captured the Ultra Warriors Ginga and Victory, she set her sight on the Earth and turned X into one of her jewel collections with the help of her minions.

Through Juggler's own Dark Ring, she used to turn objects and lifeforms that she fancied upon into jewelry for her collections. It also functions by empowering her own strength.

Murnau is portrayed by Japanese comedian Oniyakko Tsubaki (椿 鬼奴, Tsubaki Oniyakko).

=== Alien Gapiya Sadis ===
Strange Mechanical Alien Alien Gapiya "Sadis" (奇機械宇宙人 ガピヤ星人 サデス, Ki Kikai Uchūjin Gapiya Seijin Sadesu) is one of the supporting antagonist of Ultraman Orb the Movie.

First appeared in Chapter 2-3 of Ultraman Orb Chronicle, Sadis was once a bodyguard employed by Count Orlock in Planet Ganun Api and assisting him in destroying his own Enmanium mine. He fought against Gai when the latter try to foil their plans and seemingly killed after falling into a volcano. After his defeat, he was given a cybernetic reconstruction to save his life while employed by Murnau as a member of her Dark Alien Army to get his rematch with Gai. When Orb and X fought against Darebolic, Sadis dealt with the former and quickly defeated by Orb Trinity. After reforming from his previous destruction, Sadis fought the Ultras again and was sliced into half by Orb Trinity's Trinitium Giga Slash upon congratulating his opponent for putting up with a good fight.

His weapons are Gapiya Snake (ガピヤ・スネイク, Gapiya Suneiku) arm cannon and Sadestein (サデステイン, Sadesutein) sword. His main finisher is an energy punch Galactica Sadisfaction (ギャラクティカ・サデスファクション, Gyarakutika Sadesufakushon).

Sadis is voiced by Kōichi Yamadera (山寺 宏一, Yamadera Kōichi), who previously done the dub voice for Lloyd Wilder in Ultraman: Towards the Future.

=== Darebolic ===
Strange Mechanical Monster Darebolic (奇機械怪獣 デアボリック, Ki Kikai Kaijū Deaborikku) is a monster in Ultraman Orb the Movie, created by Murnau via her Dark Ring to convert the entire Earth into jewels. Having fought against Orb and X, Darebolic managed to freeze the latter and add it to Murnau's collection until Juggler banished the Dark Ring to a wormhole, causing the petrified Ultras to be freed. During the climax of the battle, Seven interfered and easily penetrated the Darebolic Cannon, allowing Orb to deliver his counterattack and defeating both Sadis and the monster with Trinitium Giga Slash.

Its main armaments is a myriad of cannons on its body and a thick set of armor that is resilient to most attacks. Through the Gem Arm (ジェムアーム, Jemu Āmu) cannon on its right hand, Darebolic can launch an attack called Jewelric Blaze (ジュエリックブレーズ, Juerikku Burēzu), turning its targets into jewels instantly. Once Sadis's hands were docked to Darebolic's back, the monster unveils Darebolic Cannon (デアボリックキャノン, Deaborikku Kyanon) from its mouth.

=== Dark Alien Army ===
The Dark Alien Army (闇の宇宙人軍団, Yami no Uchūjin Gundan) is an alien faction in Ultraman Orb The Movie.

- Murnau's Dark Ring summons: These aliens appeared when Murnau summoned them through the Dark Ring.
  - Clone Alien Alien Guts "Doppel" (分身宇宙人 ガッツ星人 ドッペル, Bunshin Uchūjin Gattsu Seijin Dopperu): An alien that was sent to chase the SSP by Murnau. He is voiced by Shinji Saitō (斉藤 慎二, Saitō Shinji) of comedian trio Jungle Pocket and is a tribute to Alien Guts from episode 39 of Ultraseven.
  - Inferno Alien Alien Hipporit "Callisto" (地獄星人 ヒッポリト星人 カリスト, Jigoku Seijin Hipporito Seijin Karisuto): An alien with a high combat prowess and aerial proficiency, he is paired with Batista. He is voiced by Hirohisa Ōta (太田 博久, Ōta Hirohisa) of comedian trio Jungle Pocket and first appeared in episode 26 of Ultraman Ace, whereas his suit was reused from Super Alien Hipporit of Superior Ultraman 8 Brothers.
  - Villainous Alien Alien Temperor "Batista" (極悪宇宙人 テンペラー星人 バチスタ, Gokuaku Uchūjin Tenperā Seijin Bachisuta): An alien with the high ranged profiency who pairs with Callisto. He is voiced by Otake (おたけ) of comedian trio Jungle Pocket and first appeared in episode 33 of Ultraman Taro.
- Murnau's alien subordinates (ムルナウ配下の宇宙人達, Murunau Haika no Uchūjin-tachi): A group of regular aliens under Murnau's servitude. They are aliens dwelling in human forms and only their heads assuming true forms once their true nature exposed.
  - Planet Phantom Cicada Woman (遊星怪人 セミ女, Yūsei Kaijin Semi Onna): She is voiced by Taiki Kudō (工藤 大輝, Kudō Taiki) of Da-ice, while her human form is portrayed by Hitomi Adachi (安達 仁美, Adachi Hitomi), and first appeared in episode 15 of Ultra Q: Dark Fantasy.
  - Insect Alien Alien Ckalutch (昆虫宇宙人 クカラッチ星人, Konchū Uchūjin Kukaratchi Seijin): He is voiced by Sōta Hanamura (花村 想太, Hanamura Sōta) of Da-ice, while his human form is portrayed by Masayuki Nunome (布米 正幸, Nunome Masayuki).
  - Slaughter Alien Hypnas (殺戮宇宙人 ヒュプナス, Satsuriku Uchūjin Hyupunasu): His human form is portrayed by Katsuyuki Okamura (岡村 勝之, Okamura Katsuyuki). First appeared in episode 8 of Ultraseven X.
  - Galmess (ガルメス人, Garumesu-jin): Her human form is portrayed by Emi Katayama (片山 絵美, Katayama Emi).
  - Possession Alien Alien Serpent (憑依宇宙人 サーペント星人, Hyōi Uchūjin Sāpento Seijin): First appeared in episode 39 of Ultraman Mebius.
  - Electric Wave Phantom Lecuum (電波怪人 レキューム人, Denpa Kaijin Rekyūmu-jin): First appeared in episode 26 of Ultra Q: Dark Fantasy.

=== Desastro ===
Super Sky Great Evil Beast Desastro (超空大凶獣 デザストロ, Chōkū Dai Kyōjū Dezasutoro) is an antagonist of chapter 8 of Ultraman Orb Chronicle, serving as the connection between the endings of Ultraman X The Movie and Ultraman Orb The Movie. As this figure reached the Earth of Ultraman X, Zero requested the help of Ultraman Orb to assist him and the titular Ultra during their fight.

=== Reibatos ===
Ghost Sorcerer Reibatos (亡霊魔道士 レイバトス, Bōrei Madō-shi Reibatosu) is the main antagonist of Ultra Fight Orb. Created by the vengeful spirit of past monsters, he sought to rule the universe while leading an army of undead monsters against the Ultra Warriors. He is also a Reionics, being one of Alien Reiblood's successors and the entire motivation for his plan is to restart the former's original campaign in conquering the universe. After incapacitating Orb in his trail, he approached the Monster Graveyard to fix the Giga Battle Nizer and revive an army of 100 monsters. Orb arrives after training for 10 years by Zero and Seven, defeating him with Emerium Slugger. Although believed to have defeated, Reibatos survived before he was killed off by Ultraman Belial in the form of Geed after Reibatos learned of the evil Ultraman's return in a failed attempt to revive him.

As a Reionics, Reibatos possessed the ability to manipulate monsters easily and revives them by chanting Ujuika Reegamiyo (ウジュイカレエガミヨ). By his own, he has the ability to regenerate from injuries and launch an energy beam Reibatos Shoot (レイバトスシュート, Reibatosu Shūto). His revival powers can be enhanced through the use of Belial's Giga Battle Nizer (ギガバトルナイザー, Giga Batoru Naizā).

His army of Ghost Monsters (亡霊怪獣, Bōrei Kaijū) includes:

- Molten Iron Monster Demaaga: See below
- Phantom Space Emperor Juda Spectre (幻影宇宙帝王 ジュダ・スペクター, Gen'ei Uchū Teiō Juda Supekutā): The space emperor who was defeated by Ultraman Victory Knight. He was revived to pursue Zero under Reibatos' orders. His main weapon is a sword named Bat Calibre (バットキャリバー, Batto Kyaribā). Juda Spectre was destroyed alongside Mecha Gomora by Orb Trinity and Ultimate Zero. First appeared in Ultra Fight Victory.
- Mecha Robot Monster Mecha Gomora (メカロボット怪獣 メカゴモラ, Meka Robotto Kaijū Meka Gomora): Reibatos' second revival, sent to help Juda in against Zero before Orb Lightning Attacker intervenes. Its main weapons are a pair of chain-bounded claws on its arm, called Knuckle Chains (ナックルチェーン, Nakkuru Chēn). Mecha Gomora was destroyed alongside Juda Spectre by Orb Trinity and Ultimate Zero. First appeared in Ultra Galaxy Legend Side Story: Ultraman Zero vs. Darklops Zero.
- Ultra Roaring Monster Vict Lugiel (超咆哮獣 ビクトルギエル, Chō Hōkō-jū Bikuto Rugieru): Destroyed by Orb and Zero via Burnmite and Strong-Corona Zero respectively. First appeared in episode 14 of Ultraman Ginga S.
- Space Robot King Joe (宇宙ロボット キングジョー, Uchū Robotto Kingu Jō): The robot that was piloted by Alien Pedan in the past, it fought against its old foe Ultraseven, who managed to destroy it by slicing King Joe via his Eye Slugger. First appeared in episode 13 of Ultraseven.
- Volcanic Bird Monster Birdon (火山怪鳥 バードン, Kazan Kaichō Bādon): A gigantic bird who defeated Zoffy in the past before its death by Ultraman Taro. Zoffy fought the monster again and managed to finally won against it, proving his growth of strength after his first defeat. First appeared in episode 17 of Ultraman Taro.
- Subterranean Monster Gudon (地底怪獣 グドン, Chitei Kaijū Gudon): An underground monster that Jack fought in the past. It was destroyed by the same Ultraman via Spacium Ray. First appeared in episode 5 of Return of Ultraman.
- Ancient Monster Twin Tail (古代怪獣 ツインテール, Kodai Kaijū Tsuin Tēru): Gudon's prey and enemy in the past, who ironically cooperate after their revival from Reibatos. It was destroyed by Ultraman Jack via his Ultra Lance. First appeared in episode 5 of Return of Ultraman.
- Space Dinosaur Hyper Zetton (Imago) (宇宙恐竜 ハイパーゼットン(イマーゴ), Uchū Kyōryū Haipā Zetton (Imāgo)): Destroyed by Ultraman Orb and Zero via Hurricane Slash and Luna-Miracle Zero. First appeared in Ultraman Saga.
- Despot Monster Tyrant (暴君怪獣 タイラント, Bōkun Kaijū Tairanto): A monster revived through the use of Giga Battle Nizer. It fought against Zoffy and Jack but met its death at the hands of Seven, Zero and Orb Emerium Slugger. First appeared in episode 40 of Ultraman Taro.

Reibatos is voiced by Hidenari Ugaki (宇垣 秀成, Ugaki Hidenari), who previously voiced Mold Spectre in Ultraman X.

=== Alien Reiblood ===
Alien Reiblood (レイブラッド星人, Reiburaddo Seijin) was the antagonist of Ultra Galaxy Mega Monster Battle and its other spin-offs and sequels. Although not appeared, his name was mentioned in Ultra Fight Orb, with Reibatos as a survivor to his legacy, the Reionics (レイオニクス, Reionikusu).

== Other characters ==
Original series

- Yūka (ユウカ; 5, Movie): A young girl who lost her doll in a park before Gai picked it and for Jetta to fix the doll. She made a returning appearance in Orb the Movie. Yūka is portrayed by Kokoro Hirasawa (平澤 宏々路, Hirasawa Kokoro).
- Princess Tamayura (タマユラ姫, Tamayura-hime; 6, 11, 12): An ancient princess that laid to rest in the forbidden forest, she possess psychic powers, such as the ability to turn giant. Long ago, she was kidnapped by Maga-Orochi in its rampaging spree before she was rescued by Zoffy and had used the latter's power to keep the monster from awakening again. In the present day, with the Planetary Invasion Coalition made their hideout in the forest, Tamayura tried her best to ensure those who enter the forest to escape but some of them were killed by Alien Nackle Nagus after trapping the humans in a space distortion. She managed to rescue the SSP and Captain Shibukawa long enough for Gai to appear and take care of them. As the Coalition left the forest, both her and Gai exchange smile before fading away. She reappeared again when Jugglus tried to awaken Maga-Orochi, with her efforts were futile as the former succeeded. After Naomi's mother Keiko planted a seed near her memorial, she reappeared again from the plant and delivered Gai the cards of Zoffy and Belial before sacrificing herself to Maga-Orochi, allowing Belial to give Gai a permission to use his power. She is portrayed by Morgan Mala (モーガン茉愛羅, Mōgan Maara).
- Haruka Kirishima (霧島 ハルカ, Kirishima Haruka; 7, 23): A civilian who was born with the precognition abilities, foreseeing the future in a terrible way which causes her to fell into sorrow and despair and gives birth to the Minus Energy monster Hoe. She had been foreseeing monsters in the series the day before their appearances and when predicting Hoe's attack, she saw Gai/Ultraman Orb died from the attack. As Orb's battle with Hoe in the next day seems to go based on her dream, Gai and Naomi's words allowed her to move on from her fears and finally gives Orb an upper hand to defeat it. She meets Gai for the last time and revealed another dream she had, which was him facing Ultraman Belial's card but knows that he would bravely overcome it. She reappeared again sometime later, informing Gai about the arrival of a great darkness, which was revealed to be Magatano-Orochi's awakening. She is portrayed by Narumi Uno (宇野 愛海, Uno Narumi).
- Genzaburo Tomatsu (戸松 源三郎, Tomatsu Genzaburō; 8): A local fishmonger that took care of the parent-child pair Ragon. When they wanted to return to the sea, he helped them get out and receive help from both SSP and VTL Squad. He is portrayed by Kenji Anan (阿南 健治, Anan Kenji).
- Jetta's father (9): Jetta's unnamed father, he was shown in the youth's flashback and taught his son that being a hero doesn't always meant to get oneself injured. He is portrayed by Katsuyuki Yamazaki (山﨑 勝之, Yamazaki Katsuyuki), the actor of Masaki Kazamori from Heisei Ultraseven.
- Keiko Yumeno (夢野 圭子, Yumeno Keiko; 11, 12, 16): Naomi's mother and Shibukawa's older sister-in-law. She is rather a spoiled woman, due to her grandmother's influence and hastily wanted Naomi to marry a successful man but does shows some sense of support to help Naomi realize her dreams. While SSP were busy reforming Tamayura's memorial stone, she planted a seed which soon grows into Tamayura herself, allowing the princess to help delivering Gai the cards of Zoffy and Belial. Before leaving, she heard of Gai playing his Orbnica and recalled its similarity to somewhere else. Like Naomi, she is Natasha's descendant and gave Naomi the former's matryoshka as a good luck charm. She is portrayed by Minako Tanaka (田中 美奈子, Tanaka Minako).
- Soichi Kofune (小舟 惣一, Kofune Sōichi; 14, 15): The president of his spring manufacturing company, Kofune Manufacturing (コフネ製作所, Kokune Seisakusho). His factory is known to be aligning with the VTL Squad, providing them with Z-VTOL designs in exchange of financial support to his factory. He has known Shin since the boy's childhood and has been the latter's source of moral support. He is portrayed by Ryo Kinomoto (木之元 亮, Kinomoto Ryō), whose previously known for portraying Gosuke Hibiki in Ultraman Dyna.
- Tetsuko Shibukawa (渋川 テツコ, Shibukawa Tetsuko; 18): Shibukawa's only daughter and a middle school student, who has a strained relationship with her father, going as far as to change her name to Katherine (キャサリン, Kyasarin) to further sever her ties with her father. She is in love with the jewel seller Takahiro and alongside SSP, tailed Shibukawa in his daily activities. She was shocked to discover the man she fallen for is an alien in disguise until Shibukawa killed him for hurting her. After the incident, Tetsuko's relationship with her father started anew. She is portrayed by Chika Arakawa (荒川 ちか, Arakawa Chika).
- Yoko (陽子, Yōko; 19): Naomi's high school friend who is engaged to Akira (朗), a member of the family that owns the first-class Toto Hotel chain. Despite being engaged to each others, their parents never agreed with their marriage and instead, decided to run their own hotel together. Naomi's jealousy towards her accidentally unsealed Renki and the giant samurai almost destroyed the hotel until Naomi apologizes to him. She is portrayed by Miyu Yagyu (柳生 みゆ, Yagyū Miyu).
- Wataru Iwaki (岩木 渉, Iwaki Wataru; 21) and Kaoru Iwaki (岩木 薫, Iwaki Kaoru; 21): A pair of elderly couple that travelled across the world, they adopted Maya after finding her abandoned in the street, raising her as if she was their granddaughter and were well aware of her evil side (Maddock) trying to usurp control for her body before Maya expelled him at the expense of her memories. The two decided to let her go travelling around the world and wished for her to return to their house someday. They are portrayed by Kotaro Shiga (志賀 廣太郎, Shiga Kōtarō) and Taeko Hattori (服部 妙子, Hattori Taeko) respectively.
- Akie Kishine (岸根 秋恵, Kishine Akie; 24): The wife of the late Professor Kishine (岸根教授, Kishine-kyōju) who has the original book of the Pacific Records. Before her husband's passing in October, both him and Akie are followers of the SSP website. When Jetta and Shin seek permission to refer to the original book, Akie happily did so and in fact revealed that her late husband wanted to give them the original book in wake of Magatano-Orochi's crisis. She is portrayed by Chisako Hara (原 知佐子, Hara Chisako), the wife of late Akio Jissoji, one of Ultraman's director. Meanwhile, the photo of late Professor Kishine was represented by Masahisa Taguchi (田口 正久, Taguchi Masahisa), who is none other than the grandfather of Ultraman Orb's director, Kiyotaka Taguchi.

The Origin Saga

- Shohei Moriwaki (森脇 翔平, Moriwaki Shōhei): A researcher at Tenkawa Biology Research Center (天河生物学研究センター, Tenkawa Seibutsu-gaku Kenkyū Sentā) who picked a strange seed from an underwater civilization. Upon touching it, he has the ability to meet Queen Amate spiritually. He is portrayed by Yasuhisa Furuhara (古原 靖久, Furuhara Yasuhisa).
- Yui Nishioka (西岡 結衣, Nishioka Yui): Shohei's co-worker, she is concerned of his strange behavior since the salvage of a seed from said civilization. She is portrayed by Karen Miyazaki (宮﨑 香蓮, Miyazaki Karen).
- Yosuke Aoi (青井 洋介, Aoi Yōsuke): The director of Tenkawa Biology Research Center who believes that the seed Shohei and Yui had salvaged is that of Yggdrasil. He is portrayed by Mister Chin (ミスターちん, Misutā Chin).

== Other Monsters and Aliens ==
=== Good ===
Original series

- Primordial Amphibian Ragon (海底原人 ラゴン, Kaitei Genjin Ragon; 8, 24): A race of Gill-man-like creatures who previously ruled the Earth in its prehistoric age. In the present day, a Ragon and its child wandered in the human world after the fish supply at the sea depleted. The two seek refuge under the fishmonger Genzaburo who provided them with fish. One day, while trying to get back to the shore, local residents reported their sightings to the VTL Squad, prompting Genzaburo to quietly smuggle them out with the SSP and Shibukawa offered them their help. Sometime later, the Ragon family was shown leaving Japan while silently riding on Gubila's back without the fish monster's own permission. First appeared in episode 21 of Ultra Q.
  - Ragon Jr. (ラゴンJr., Ragon Junia; 8, 24): The child of a Ragon, who was also under care by Genzaburo and was given a wooden sailing ship toy by said fishmonger. When Gubila surfaced to hunt them for food, the Ragon child was quickly eaten by the monster until Orb rescued it. After the battle, Ragon Jr. and its parent were quickly brought away to safety with the help of SSP and VTL Squad.
- Dark Alien Alien Babarue "Babaryu" (暗黒星人 ババルウ星人 ババリュー, Ankoku Seijin Babarū Seijin Babaryū; 9): Originally an agent of Planetary Invasion Coalition by the codename Space Directive M774 (宇宙指令M774, Uchū Shirei Emu Nana Nana Yon), (Note: This name is a tribute to the episode 21 of Ultra Q, as part of Find the Subtitle of episode 9.) he was sent by Alien Meflias Nostra to frame Ultraman as Imitation Ultraman Orb (にせウルトラマンオーブ, Nise Urutoraman Ōbu), but when he was forced to fight Telesdon, who appeared in a contrived coincidence, Babaryu accidentally saved the civilians. He was met by Jetta in his human disguise, named Ryuji Baba (馬場 竜次, Baba Ryūji), and was mistaken by the young man and the town's children for the human form of Ultraman Orb, and through his time spent playing with the children, eventually allowed him to desire to redeem himself from his criminal past, and trying to fight a Cherubim that was sent by the Coalition before the real Ultraman Orb. Although his real identity was revealed, Babaryu was nonetheless thanked by Jetta and the children that he saved earlier before starting his new life on Earth as a cleaner at a playground. He was briefly shown in episode 22 among the photos of Black Directive's past customers. He is portrayed by Ryusuke Nakamura (中村 龍介, Nakamura Ryūsuke). Meanwhile, he is a tribute to Alien Babarue from episodes 38 and 39 of Ultraman Leo.
- Maya (マーヤ, Māya; 21): An artificial life form created by Alien Zetton Maddock as his own spare body should he died. Called by many as The Girl With the Blue Ribbon (青いリボンの少女, Aoi Ribon no Shōjo), the appearance of a human girl would gave Maddock an advantage in his encounter against Gai but because of the moments she spent with the Iwaki couple, this caused the artificial life form to develop her own sentience. She was adopted by the elderly Iwaki couple and struggled with Maddock's own consciousness, finally being able to destroy her own creator at the expense of her own memories. In aftermath of the battle, she went travelling across the world while promising to return to the Iwaki household area someday. She is portrayed by Kayako Okuda (奥田 佳弥子, Okuda Kayako).
- Commander Black (ブラック指令, Burakku Shirei; 22): An alien who originally planned to invade the Earth but upon his arrival, he ended up runs his own coffee shop Cafe Black Star (カフェ・ブラックスター, Kafe Burakku Sutā) as Manager Black (ブラック店長, Burakku-tenchō). Although his target customers were supposedly aliens, such as Gai and Juggler, he is also open to certain humans who managed to come across his café. When SSP tried to investigate his shop, he quickly kick them out when they tried to investigate more of his shop. On that same day, he closed his shop and tried to peacefully leaves the Earth but his partner Nova wanted to fulfill their last chance to invade the Earth, until their efforts were thwarted by Orb. While grieving over Nova's loss, Gai reminded him of how he has loyal customers and that Nova's actions were wrong. It was later implied that he opens a ramen shop called Ramen Black Star (ラーメン・ブラックスター, Rāmen Burakku Sutā), attracting the attentions of Shibukawa and SSP members. He is portrayed by Shoichiro Akaboshi (赤星 昇一郎, Akaboshi Shōichirō) and is based on the similarly named antagonist of episodes 40 to 51 of Ultraman Leo.

The Origin Saga

- Morcus (モークス, Mōkusu; 1, 2): A young native of Planet Rurin, his parents were among the victims of a Bezelb's infection, who would later lose their lives after being trampled by the same monster. During Gai and Juggler's stop on that Planet, the two defended Morcus from the Bezelb, as well as preparing a funeral for his parents. He was later taken care by a nearby village when the two warriors try to pursue an infected Bemstar. Morcus is portrayed by Rihito Matsuura (松浦 理仁, Matsuura Rihito).
- Planet Juran monsters (3): These monsters were previously Earth's inhabitants in Ultraman Cosmos, but brought to live on Planet Juran following the conclusion of Ultraman Cosmos' final battle on Earth in hopes of keeping them away from interfering with human civilizations.
  - Friendly Giant Bird Lidorias (友好巨鳥 リドリアス, Yūkō Kyochō Ridoriasu): First appeared in episode 1 of Ultraman Cosmos.
  - Electric Shock Monster Bolgills (電撃怪獣 ボルギルス, Dengeki Kaijū Borugirusu): First appeared in episode 20 of Ultraman Cosmos.

=== Evil ===
Original series

- Sulfuric Acid Monster Hoe (硫酸怪獣 ホー, Ryūsan Kaijū Hō; 7): A Minus Energy (マイナスエネルギー, Mainasu Enerugī) monster created from a civilian named Haruka, whose precognitive abilities driven her into sorrow and despair. Orb uses Burnmite and engaged in a battle against the monster but was quickly overpowered until Gai and Naomi's words brought Haruka out of her fears and encourages Orb, thus removing Hoe off from its abilities and allowing Spacium Zeperion to finish it. Hoe is capable of absorbing Minus Energies to strengthen itself and reform to its original state should it be destroyed. Its main attack involves acidic tears and the use of Hoe Flash (ホーフラッシュ, Hō Furasshu) from its mouth. First appeared episode 3 of Ultraman 80.
- Space Phantom Alien Zelan (宇宙怪人 ゼラン星人, Uchū Kaijin Zeran Seijin; 18): An alien criminal that was chased by Shibukawa in the latter's flashback. First appeared in episode 31 of The Return of Ultraman.
- Dark Alien Alien Shaplay "Katarohi" (暗黒星人 シャプレー星人 カタロヒ, Ankoku Seijin Shapurē Seijin Katarohi; 18): An alien criminal that assumed the disguise of a youth named Takahiro (タカヒロ). His agenda involves selling Yaseltonium (ヤセルトニウム, Yaserutoniumu) necklaces to women and absorb their life-forces into his Yaseltonium crystal in hopes of empowering his monster Bemular. Although both the Yaseltonium and his Bemular destroyed, he managed to escape after faking his death but was killed for real by Jugglus Juggler. He is voiced by Shōta Yamamoto (山本 祥太, Yamamoto Shōta) while his human form Takahiro is portrayed by Takuya Inoue (井上 拓哉, Inoue Takuya). He is a tribute to the Alien Shaplay from episode 20 of Ultraseven.
- Space Monster Bemular (Enhanced) (宇宙怪獣 ベムラー（強化）, Uchū Kaijū Bemurā (Kyōka); 18): Originally a space monster under Katarohi's control, Bemular was empowered through his Yaseltonium, gaining enhanced abilities. It was able to shake off Ultraman Orb in Spacium Zeperion before it was defeated by Orb Origin's Orb Flame Calibur. Bemular's main attack is Hyper Pale Heat Ray (ハイパーペイル熱線, Haipā Peiru Nessen) and can absorb incoming attacks from its horns before channeling it to its own energy. Bemular first appeared in episode 1 of Ultraman.
- Vengeful Demon Renki (Guren Equestrian) (怨霊鬼 戀鬼（紅蓮騎）, Onryō-ki Renki (Gurenki); 19): A samurai-themed demon clad in crimson armor (thus the nickname Guren Equestrian) from Sengoku period, who was created from the grudge of a pair of deceased lovers from different factions, a daimyo and a princess. Their jealousy on happy couples prompted Renki to attack any wedding ceremony before he was sealed by an omyoji into a magic stone. In the present day, his sealed form helped women find their ideal couple but Naomi's jealousy towards Yoko lifted the seal. This allowed the samurai ghost to return and attack Yoko's wedding. While Orb tried his best to hold the giant until Naomi apologized and stopped him, allowing Renki to surrender and be willingly terminated by the Orb Water Calibur. His main attack is Mystic Energy Guren Reversal (妖気紅蓮返し, Yōki Guren-gaeshi), charging his katana with dark energies before slashing the enemy with it. He is a tribute to the similarly named samurai ghost from episode 18 of Ultraman Cosmos.
- Saucer Creature Nova (円盤生物 ノーバ, Enban Seibutsu Nōba; 22): Commander Black's partner, who was also the Cafe Black Star's main mascot. When he closes the shop, Nova reminded him of their original dream to invade the Earth and took this opportunity to do so. Nova faced itself against Orb and was reduced to firecrackers upon its destruction. Prior to Nova's proper appearance, it was shown in episode 6 as one of the sets of Monster Cards required by Nagus to create "Four of A Kind" poker hand. First appeared in episode 49 of Ultraman Leo.
- Kamaitadon (カマイタドン): A Kamaitachi-themed monster that was only mentioned in Pacific Records. Due to mysterious slash marks appearing in several buildings, the SSP were led to believe it as the monster's own doing until it was revealed to be the work of Jugglus Juggler, who spend his time perfecting his new attack, the Crescent Moon Shockwave.

The Origin Saga

- Petrification Evil Monster Gargorgon (石化魔獣 ガーゴルゴン, Sekika Majū Gāgorugon; 2, 10): An intelligent space life form that attacked Planet Kanon in the past. Gargorgon defeated Amate's mother when she used the power of War Deity but peacefully moves on under the wish of young Amate. First appeared in episode 6 of Ultraman X.

Ultraman Orb Chronicle

- Dr. Jiggle (ジグル博士, Jiguru-hakase; 2-1): A man who conspire with Murnau to steal the assets of Planet Cobol. After Ultraman Orb's intervention, he was imprisoned while Murnau escaped.
- Tank Monster Dino-Tank (戦車怪獣 恐竜戦車, Sensha Kaijū Kyōryū Sensha; 2-1): A dinosaur/tank hybrid employed by Murnau and Jiggle for their plan, it was destroyed by Ultraman Orb. First appeared in episode 28 of Ultraseven.
- Water Demon (水の魔神, Mizu no Majin; 2-2): Three monsters of Water Planet Nuok who were sealed sometime prior before Salamni released them to stop the ongoing war of Sirocco and Ghibli tribes. With all three of them getting out of control, Orb interferes the battle and eliminated them. As a result, from their defeat, he obtained the Water gem from Gamakujira and added it to the Orbcalibur.
  - Water Spout Monster Gamakujira (汐ふき怪獣 ガマクジラ, Shio Fuki Kaijū Gamakujira): First appeared in episode 14 of Ultraman.
  - Oil Monster Pestar (油獣 ペスター, Yujū Pesutā): First appeared in episode 13 of Ultraman.
  - Oil Monster Takkong (オイル怪獣 タッコング, Oiru Kaijū Takkongu): First appeared in episode 1 of Return of Ultraman.
- Count Orlock (オルロック伯爵, Oruroku-hakushaku; 2-3): The owner of an Enmanium (エンマニウム, Enmaniumu) mine in Volcano Planet Ganun Api (火山惑星ガヌン・アピ, Kazan Wakusei Ganun Api). Seeing the decreased number of miners as a threat, Orlock plans to detonate his own mine to claim an insurance money. During Gai's arrival, he employs the help of Alien Gapiya Sadis to deal with the traveller before his actions lead to the awakening of Magma Monster Gora. After said monster's defeat, Orlock was arrested for his crimes.
- Alien Zartana (ザルタナ星人, Zarutana Seijin; 2-4): He is a space capitalist that hired a group of stray aliens to coerce the settlements of Wind Planet Guillermo (風の惑星ギレルモ, Kaze no Wakusei Girerumo) out from the Planet and built a space highway on it. After the Ramon Brothers defeated, Zartana try to employ Juggler as his bodyguard but was killed and had the Wind jewel claimed.
- Assassin Alien Alien Nackle "Ramon Brothers" (暗殺宇宙人 ナックル星人 ラモン兄弟, Ansatsu Uchūjin Nakkuru Seijin Ramon Kyōdai; 2-4): One of the stray aliens employed by Alien Zartana to coerce the settlements of Guillermo out from said planet. They are tributes to the Alien Nackle from episode 37 of Return of Ultraman.
- Planet 484 prisoners (3): The inmates of Planet 484, which contains the worst criminals in the universe, both monsters and aliens alike. When Juggler and Biranki orchestrated a prison break, Orb neutralizes the situation by eliminating them with the Orb Ground Calibur.
- Balloon Monster Balloonga (風船怪獣 バルンガ, Fūsen Kaijū Barunga; 3): A monster that was kept within a capsule as the gravitational force of Planet 484. During Juggler and Biranki's escape, he transformed Balloonga into a black hole bomb called Balloonga Bomb (バルンガボム, Barunga Bomu) and threatened the Interstellar Alliance to bring Gai towards him. Shorty defused the bomb at the expense of his own life. First appeared in episode 11 of Ultra Q.
- Unnamed 3 meter alien (5-2): A group of aliens that Gai and Scudder found during their travel. They were shortly defeated and retreated.

Stage shows

- Zetton Alien Baltan (ゼットンバルタン星人, Zetton Barutan Seijin): A monster/alien hybrid which is exclusive to the first arc of Ultraman Festival 2016 stage show, this form is resulted when a nearly defeated Alien Baltan uses the Monster Cards of himself and Zetton. Although managed to destroy the Ultra Warriors, he was soon weakened when the original Ultraman appeared and used Colorium Ray before the latter was joined by Orb to combine their finishers. Upon defeat, the Alien Baltan was fortunately spared by the pacifist Tiny Baltan. In the second arc of the stage show, Zetton Alien Baltan was summoned by Zett in his final moments as the Ultra Warriors' final opponents. He was shortly defeated by Ultraman Orb's Sperion Ray.
- Cyber Mecha Baltan (サイバーメカバルタン, Saibā Meka Barutan): A cyborg Alien Baltan which appeared in the first arc of Ultraman Festival. This figure is armed with a drill on its right arm and a mechanical pincher from its left arm. Its suit was modified from Baltan Battler Barel from Mega Monster Rush: Ultra Frontier game series that was used for attraction and its right hand drill is from Denpagon Armor, a MonsArmor that is exclusive to the 2015 Ultraman Festival. Meanwhile, Cyber Mecha Baltan is a tribute to Mecha Baltan from Andro Melos comic series.
- Space Fear-Demon Zett (宇宙恐魔人 ゼット, Uchū Kyō Majin Zetto): (Note: Originally called "Unknown Enemy" (謎の強敵, Nazo no Kyōteki)) The main antagonist of the second stage-show of Ultraman Festival 2016. His main weapon is a spear and has the abilities of Zetton and its past incarnations. Created by Alien Bat, Zett is a biological weapon with the data of every incarnation of Zetton but soon betrayed his master once developing sentience. Following his former master's wish, he led an army of Zetton in an attack against the Land of Light. He soon fight against the Space Garrisons who joined by Ultraman Zero, X and Orb. He was defeated by the original Ultraman when the two clashed their finishers, but summoned the Zetton Alien Baltan as his final servant before perishing. He is voiced by Tomokazu Sugita (杉田 智和, Sugita Tomokazu).

=== Neutral ===
Original series

- Deep Sea Monster Gubila (深海怪獣 グビラ, Shinkai Kaijū Gubira; 8, 24): A fish-like monster that ate up the fish supplies in the sea. With the number of fishes decreasing, it surfaced towards the land and proceed to hunt the Ragon parent-child pair. When the child Ragon was devoured, Orb appeared and saved it before engaging in a fight against the monster and brought it away from the shore, ending the fight with no loses on both sides. Sometime later before Magatano-Orochi's rise, Gubila was shown leaving the Japan sea, unaware that the Ragon family hitch a ride on its back without permission. Gubila's main weapon is a drill on its nose and its main attack is Die-Hard Drill Attack (ダイハードドリルアタック, Dai Hādo Doriru Atakku), which involves impaling the opponent with its drill. First appeared in episode 24 of Ultraman.
- Subterranean Monster Telesdon (地底怪獣 テレスドン, Chitei Kaijū Teresudon; 9, 24): A prehistoric carnosaurian monster that appeared in a contrived coincidence when Babaryu/Imitation Ultraman Orb tried to damage the real Ultra's reputation. Their fight only boosted the real Orb's reputation when Babaryu accidentally shielded Gai and two children before the monster retreated underground. It appeared sometime later alongside Gomess (S) and Demaaga, submerging from the underground after Magatano-Orochi's consumption of the ground's nutrients disturbed them from their slumber. But once they about to face Ultraman Orb, all of them simultaneously passed out. After investigating its pulses, Orb slowly closes Telesdon's eyelids and letting the monster to peacefully die on its own. Prior its physical appearance, Telesdon's Monster Card was used by Jugglus as one of the sets required to awaken Maga-Grand King. First appeared in episode 22 of Ultraman.
- Transforming Phantom Alien Pitt "Myu" (変身怪人 ピット星人 ミュー, Henshin Kaijin Pitto Seijin Myū; 22): A regular customer of Black Directive's Cafe Black Star under her human disguise Miyuki (みゆき). Taking pity that the Black Directive may departed from Earth by himself, she offered him a ride with her spaceship until he revealed that he also had his own companion, Nova. She is portrayed by Rio Akisada (秋定 里穂, Akisada Rio) and is a tribute to Alien Pitt from episode 3 of Ultraseven.
- Café Black Star's regulars (22): These aliens appeared in the picture as regular customers of Commander Black's Café Black Star.
  - Wandering Alien Alien Pegassa (放浪宇宙人 ペガッサ星人, Hōrō Uchūjin Pegassa Seijin): First appeared in episode 6 of Ultraseven.
  - Evil Alien Alien Zarab (凶悪宇宙人 ザラブ星人, Kyōaku Uchūjin Zarabu Seijin): First appeared in episode 18 of Ultraman.
  - Psychic Power Race Zenekindahl (念力種族 ゼネキンダール人, Nenriki Shuzoku Zenekindāru-jin): First appeared in episode 10 of Ultraman Dyna.
  - Conspiracy Alien Alien Manon (謀略宇宙人 マノン星人, Inbō Uchujin Manon Seijin): First appeared in episode 37 of Ultraman Tiga.
  - Friendly Cross-Alien Alien Neril (友好異星人 ネリル星人, Yūkō Iseijin Neriru Seijin): First appeared in episode 25 of Ultraman Max.
  - Collective Alien Alien Huk (集団宇宙人 フック星人, Shūdan Uchūjin Fukku Seijin): First appeared in episode 47 of Ultraseven.
  - Wicked Alien Alien Reguran (悪質宇宙人 レギュラン星人, Akushitsu Uchūjin Regyuran Seijin): First appeared in episode 7 of Ultraman Tiga.
  - Three-Faced Phantom Dada (三面怪人 ダダ, Sanmen Kaijin Dada): He was only mentioned by Alien Pitt "Myu" and appeared amongst the pictures of Cafe Black Star's customers. Myu also mentioned that his ship accidentally crashed one of space trash, causing some of his coffee beans that was given by Black Directive to fell on Earth, which was soon picked up by several VTL officers on the space trash's crash site. First appeared in episode 28 of Ultraman.
  - Space Superman Alien Steal (宇宙超人 スチール星人, Uchū Chōjin Suchīru Seijin): First appeared in episode 40 of Ultraman Ace.
- Molten Iron Monster Demaaga (熔鉄怪獣 デマーガ, Yōtetsu Kaijū Demāga; 24 (series), Fight Orb): One of the three monsters that surfaces alongside Telesdon and Gomess (S), awakening from their slumber when Magatano-Orochi was eating the ground's nutrients. Before they would face Ultraman Orb, all three of them simultaneously passed out. In Ultra Fight Orb, a Demaaga was revived by Reibatos to fight Orb on Earth before it was decimated by Lightning Attacker. First appeared in episode 1 of Ultraman X.
- Ancient Monster Gomess (S) (古代怪獣 ゴメス(S), Kodai Kaijū Gomesu (Esu); 24): One of the three monsters that surfaces alongside Telesdon and Demaaga, awakening from their slumber when Magatano-Orochi was eating the ground's nutrients. Before they would face Ultraman Orb, all three of them simultaneously passed out. Gomess (S) first appeared in episode 1 of Ultra Galaxy Mega Monster Battle: Never Ending Odyssey while its original and diminutive form, Gomess, first appeared in episode 1 of Ultra Q.

Ultraman Orb Chronicle

- Magma Monster Gora (マグマ怪獣 ゴラ, Maguma Kaijū Gora; 2-3): A monster sleeping under an Enmanium mine. When Orlock detonated his own mine, Gora was awakened from the explosion and went on a rampage until Orb defeated it with his Orb Water Calibur. First appeared in episode 12 of Ultraman 80.
- Mummy Monster Dodongo (ミイラ怪獣 ドドンゴ, Miira Kaijū Dodongo; 4): A monster that wreak havoc on Ishtal Civilization. Juggler absorbed its card after its defeat by Orb and used it to awaken Maga-Tanothor. First appeared in episode 12 of Ultraman.
- Ancient Monster Kingsaurus II (古代怪獣 キングザウルス二世, Kodai Kaijū Kinguzaurusu Ni-sei; 5-1): A monster that was frozen beneath tundra until it was freed from the ice meltdown as a sign of the Lord Monsters' awakening. As it attacked the settlements of Lake Baikal, Orb appeared and defeated the monster, allowing Juggler to harvest its card and used it to awaken Maga-Zetton. Kingsaurus II is a tribute to Kingsaurus III from episode 4 of Return of Ultraman.
- Space Combat Beast Super C.O.V. (宇宙戦闘獣 超コッヴ, Uchū Sentō-jū Sūpā Kovvu; 5-1): A monster that appeared in a fjord valley and engaged in a heated battle against Orb. Despite Orb's victory, the battle caused his human alter ego Gai to suffer from amnesia as a result of multiple injuries. Juggler harvested the monster's card and used it as part of awakening Maga-Zetton. First appeared in episode 44 of Ultraman Gaia.
- Light Monster Prizuma (光怪獣 プリズ魔, Hikari Kaijū Purizuma; 5-1): One month after Super C.O.V.'s destruction, Prizuma appeared in Rusalka. Gai regained his memory and transformed into Ultraman Orb to fight the monster. Upon its destruction, Juggler harvested its card to awaken Maga-Zetton. First appeared in episode 35 of Return of Ultraman.
- Freezing Monster Peguila (冷凍怪獣 ペギラ, Reitō Kaijū Pegira; 6): Awakened from a drift of ice in Rupashika's territory in North Arctic, Peguila was defeated by Orb. Juggler harvested its card to awaken Maga-Basser, forcing Gai to smuggle himself in a shipment truck heading towards Japan. First appeared in episode 5 of Ultra Q.

=== Monster Cards ===
Monster Cards (怪獣カード, Kaijū Kādo) are darker counterparts of Ultra Fusion Cards that bore the powers and grudges of an Ultra Monster. Although the actual origin is unknown, several forces were shown using it, such as Juggler, members of Planetary Invasion Coalition and Murnau. Through the Dark Ring, a Monster Card can be created by harvesting the destroyed remains of an Ultra Monster, with said device as well allows their users to summon physical projections of Monster Cards.

- Magnetic Force Monster Antlar (磁力怪獣 アントラー, Jiryoku Kaijū Antorā; 2): One of the four sets used by Juggler to awaken Maga-Grand King. First appeared in episode 7 of Ultraman.
- Ancient Monster Gomora (古代怪獣 ゴモラ, Kodai Kaijū Gomora; 2): One of the four sets used by Juggler to awaken Maga-Grand King. First appeared in episode 26 of Ultraman.
- Super Ancient Monster Golza (超古代怪獣 ゴルザ, Chō Kodai Kaijū Goruza; 2): One of the four sets used by Juggler to awaken Maga-Grand King. First appeared in episode 1 of Ultraman Tiga.
- Prehistoric Bird Litra (原始怪鳥 リトラ, Genshi Kaichō Ritora; 6): One of Nagus' Four Cards poker hand of Wind-themed Monster Cards. First appeared in episode 1 of Ultra Q.
- Super Ancient Dragon Melba (超古代竜 メルバ, Chō Kodai Ryū Meruba; 6): One of Nagus' Four Cards poker hand of Wind-themed Monster Cards. First appeared in episode 1 of Ultraman Tiga.
- Saucer Creature Silver Bloome (円盤生物 シルバーブルーメ, Enban Seibutsu Shirubā Burūme; 6): One of Nagus' Four Cards poker hand of Wind-themed Monster Cards. First appeared in episode 40 of Ultraman Leo.
- Skull Monster Red King (どくろ怪獣 レッドキング, Dokuro Kaijū Reddo Kingu; 6): One of the "King of Five" cards used by Juggler to win a poker game against the Coalition. First appeared in episode 8 of Ultraman.
- Space Monster Eleking (宇宙怪獣 エレキング, Uchū Kaijū Erekingu; 6): One of the "King of Five" cards used by Juggler to win a poker game against the Coalition. First appeared in episode 3 of Ultraseven.
- Strongest Combined Beast King of Mons (最強合体獣 キングオブモンス, Saikyō Gattai-jū Kingu Obu Monsu; 6): One of the "King of Five" cards used by Juggler to win a poker game against the Coalition. First appeared in Ultraman Gaia: The Battle in Hyperspace.
- Enma Monster Enmargo (えんま怪獣 エンマーゴ, Enma Kaijū Enmāgo; 10): Used by Juggler as a tarot reading for Nagus, which represented "sudden death". First appeared in episode 14 of Ultraman Taro.
- Space Dinosaur Zetton (宇宙恐竜 ゼットン, Uchū Kyōryū Zetton; 16, Movie): Alongside Pandon, Juggler used it to assume Zeppandon by fusing both cards via the Dark Ring. First appeared in episode 39 of Ultraman.
- Twin-headed Monster Pandon (双頭怪獣 パンドン, Sōtō Kaijū Pandon; 16, Movie): Alongside Zetton, Juggler used it to assume Zeppandon by fusing both cards via the Dark Ring. First appeared in episode 48 of Ultraseven.
- Four-Dimensional Monster Bullton (四次元怪獣 ブルトン, Yojigen Kaijū Buruton; Movie): Used by Murnau to trap Gai and other trespassers of her spaceship into the fourth dimension. First appeared in episode 17 of Ultraman.
