= List of Ultraman Orb: The Origin Saga episodes =

The original poster of the series.

Ultraman Orb: The Origin Saga (ウルトラマンオーブ THE ORIGIN SAGA, Urutoraman Ōbu Ji Orijin Sāga) is a 2016-2017 Japanese tokusatsu web series, serving as a spin-off/prequel of the 2016 Ultra Series series, Ultraman Orb. The series is set to be exclusively released on Amazon Video in Japan starting from December 26, 2016, and is planned to be released worldwide, with English and German subtitles available for international viewers.

== Episodes ==
No.	Title	Written by	Original release date
1	"Shining Star"; Transliteration: "Kiraboshi" (Japanese: きらぼし ～煌星～)	Hirotoshi Kobayashi	December 26, 2016
After being chosen as the Warrior of Light, Gai and Juggler embark on their first mission by entering Orion Nebula to stop Psychi and his army of Bezelbs. Gai and Juggler made their stop on Planet Rurin, where they defend Morcus from his enslaved parents and the Bezelb that controlled them. When transforming into Ultraman Orb for the first time, Gai has troubles in controlling his power before he can properly finish the monster in their second fight. Psychi threatens the Kanon natives to surrender their queen Amate or else he would launch a full-scale assault on their tree. Raigo of the Kanon Defense Army asserted Amate to become the War Deity and lead their army in a raid to Psychi's base. Wanting a peaceful solution, Amate sent Shinra on an expedition to Planet Zain, where Psychi greeted him and demonstrated the Kugutsu utilized by Bezelbs, enslaving their victims and feed on their strength to become stronger. Through his connection to the Queen Bezelb, he can also manipulate the Bezelbs and their victims. On Earth, two researchers Shohei and Yui discover a strange artifact from an underwater civilization 4,000 meters below the sea of Japan. Bringing it to their lab, Shohei touched it and is able to connect with Amate from Planet Kanon.
2	"Close Relations"; Transliteration: "Enishi" (Japanese: えにし ～所縁～)	Hirotoshi Kobayashi	January 2, 2017
Failing to threaten Shinra after he planted bombs around the base, Psychi can only ask for a drop of Amate's blood before the former departed. The syringe was kept by Amate, who agrees with Psychi's plan but Shinra refused out of safety. At night, while Amate reminiscing how the previous queen (her mother) lost her life after using the War Deity to fight Gargorgon, Shinra intruded her room until he was chased away by Micott and Ricca, with the soldiers believe that he is going to infect the queen with Psychi's Kugutsu. With Shinra sent to a remote planet for exile, he escaped via an escape pod, forcing Micott and Ricca to chase him and pursue the truth. After erecting a grave for Morcus' parents, Gai and Juggler decided to bring the boy to a nearby village for adoption. They discovered that an infected Bemstar stationing there as Gai left Morcus to a villager and transforms to fight the monster. With Bemstar absorbing the attacks, it escaped to space and Gai and Juggler chase the monster, where it proceed to consume the Suzark piloted by Micott and Ricca. Gai left Juggler to save the ship and its pilot while he fought against Bemstar as Ultraman Orb. After conducting an analysis of the artifact, Yusuke confirmed it to be a seed which is somehow still in perfect shape despite being aged for thousands of years. Judging by its size, Shohei believes that the seed can grow into a 300 meter-tall tree.
3	"The Echo"; Transliteration: "Kodama" (Japanese: こだま ～谺～)	Hirotoshi Kobayashi	January 9, 2017
After destroying the infected Bemstar, Gai deduced that the Bezelbs are heavily related with Kanon's crisis, thus joining the Kanon Royal Guards on their journey to Planet Zain. Before they can reach the planet, a swarm of Bezelbs attack their ship and Gai transforms to fight them, with an infected Birdon entered the battle. On Earth, once the research team connects the seal fragment, they deduced that the illustration is in fact the Yggdrasil tree. Shohei suffers a backlash from the seed that sent him in coma and sketches Kanon's Tree of Life once he awakened as his mind is being dominated by memories of Amate. Shin Asuka sensed a threat held by Psychi and his Bezelbs, while seeking Musashi (Ultraman Cosmos)'s help from Juran. He soon arrived on Planet Zain where he joins Orb in fighting the Bezelb.
4	"The Pursuit"; Transliteration: "Atotomu" (Japanese: あととむ ～跡求～)	Sotaro Hayashi	January 16, 2017
After Orb and Dyna finished the Bezelbs, they introduced each others in their human identities as Gai still ponders on the reason he obtained Orb's power while Asuka gives him a handful of advice. Leaving the Bezelbs to Juggler, Micott and Ricca found their captain imprisoned. When Juggler gets infected by the Kugutsu, Shinra cures him by using the Tree of Life's seed given by Amate before. After Psychi escaped, the party tries to chase him but the former sabotaged their ship beforehand, preventing hyperdrive functions. Shinra reveals how the commotion happened: Raigo had set up an impostor to attack Amate while he was quickly banished, allowing the latter to force Amate into the battle as the War Deity. When Shinra tries to return to the planet with said pod, he was kidnapped by Psychi to ensure the latter's plan would not be interrupted, while slipping out the Tree of Life's seed as the cure of Kugutsu. Not wanting Gai to waste his energy to chase Psychi, Asuka orders Musashi/Ultraman Cosmos to do the work. Psychi's ship arrived earlier and threatens to attack Kanon by morning should they refuse to surrender Amate. Raigo and his troops try to find Amate but she escaped. Shohei was discharged from the hospital and found himself on Kanon's castle but fails to reach Amate, resulting him returning to Earth.
5	"Daybreak"; Transliteration: "Akatsuki" (Japanese: あかつき ～暁～)	Sotaro Hayashi	January 23, 2017
Musashi met Amate and discuss over her wish to find a peaceful solution. Coerced by her people's suffering from the Bezelb's attack, Amate finally accept her fate and transforms to defend her castle. After a swordsmanship training with Juggler, Gai was noted by many that he held back his true potential until Asuka gave him an advice. When Amate transformed into the War Deity, Gai was incapable of holding back his frustration when he assumed it as his failure. As a result of Amate mourning on her people, Shohei was rendered comatose.
6	"War Deity"; Transliteration: "Ikusagami" (Japanese: いくさがみ ～戦神～)	Sotaro Hayashi	January 30, 2017
The War Deity transformed and tried her best to avoid casualties, not wanting to harm her opponents either. Seeing this, Asuka and Gai raced to Kanon as Dyna and Orb to fight the Bezelbs while the War Deity establish a contact with the Queen Bezelb. Although seemingly successful, the Queen backstabbed the War Deity with Kugutsu, infecting her before Cosmos interfered and Juggler provide the Ultras with the Tree of Life's seed. After Micott was stabbed by a Bezelb, Juggler lets out a shrill scream in response to his fear. Shohei was sent to the emergency room and received multiple defibrillations. He was able to meet Amate during the War Deity's infection.
7	"Vertigo"; Transliteration: "Kururu" (Japanese: くるる ～眩る～)	Hirotoshi Kobayashi	February 6, 2017
Under a huge trauma from witnessing Micott's death, Juggler's wish for power transformed him into an armored demon and sliced down the Tree of Life after seeing it as the source of all conflict. The War Deity was forced to destroy it in order to save the citizens, therefore endangering the planet and crushed Psychi's plan. After being branded as an enemy, Juggler broke his ties with Gai and left while both Amate and the Queen Bezelb sensed another Tree of Life. (Note: This episode marks the cameo appearance of Eichii Shimizu and Tomohiro Shimoguchi, writers of ULTRAMAN manga.) After being discharged from hospital again, Shohei discovered that the seed he salvaged is about to grow into the Tree of Life.
8	"Vibrations"; Transliteration: "Hibiki" (Japanese: ひびき ～響～)	Hisako Kurosawa	February 13, 2017
Seeing how Psychi tries to threaten both the Tree of Life and Shohei, Gai volunteered himself to go to Earth while leaving Kanon to his seniors. When the Tree of Life began sprouting on the lab, Gamu Takayama rescued both Shohei and Yui before they met Gai. Both men revealed their identities as Ultras while Shohei was entrusted with the duty to protect the tree itself. As Psychi's ship arrived, he sent down the Bezelbs to attack the city as one of them kidnapped Shohei. After rescuing Shohei, a Bezelb try to attack Orb but was incapacitated by Juggler while Gaia eliminate the giant Bezelb. Failing to destroy another giant Bezelb, Juggler fell into the ocean as it split and reveal Ultraman Agul.
9	"Reason"; Transliteration: "Kotowari" (Japanese: ことわり ～理～)	Hisako Kurosawa	February 20, 2017
After fighting as Agul, Fujimiya revealed himself to Juggler, seeing the latter being reminiscent to his past self. He visited Gamu once more before Gai left and rescued Amate's ship from being attacked. Once everyone regrouped, Amate and Shohei believed that the Queen Bezelb was controlled by Psychi, causing Gai to leave and investigate. Upon arrival, Psychi trapped him and try to detonate his own ship before Juggler interfered.
10	"Flower Storm"; Transliteration: "Hanaarashi" (Japanese: はなあらし ～花嵐～)	Sotaro Hayashi	February 27, 2017
After being rescued by Juggler, Gai witnessed the Bezelbs trying to defend the Tree of Life from Japanese government until the fruit matured. When Queen Bezelb joined her offsprings, Gai tried his best to defend her while she sought Amate's help to transform. Meeting Psychi, Shinra was about to kill him until Fujimiya appeared and pointed out the scientist's errors despite his pure intention. Amate transformed into the War Deity again under the assumption to create a new world but the Queen Bezelb betrayed her again in an attempt to infect her before Orb appeared and used his own body as a shield. This forced the War Deity to fight the Queen before Ultraman Gaia and Agul join in.
11	"Heat Haze"; Transliteration: "Kagerō" (Japanese: かげろう ～陽炎～)	Sotaro Hayashi	March 6, 2017
Successfully infecting the War Deity, the Queen effectively betrayed Psychi and planned to erase free will from the universe by using the War Deity as a bomb and spread the Kugutsu. Although having obtained a portion of the seed from the Tree of Life underwater, Ricca failed to cure the War Deity before Micott's spirit saved her ship from crash landing. Juggler obtained the seed instead and use it to purify Gai before he joined the battle to surpass the warrior of light. After being defeated by Juggler, the Queen insisted Psychi's help again with Partel fused both of them into Psyqueen.
12	"New World"; Transliteration: "Mahoroba" (Japanese: まほろば ～新世界～)	Hirotoshi Kobayashi	March 13, 2017
Due to Psyqueen's formation, Psychi has no longer needed the fruits from Tree of Life and tries to destroy it. Asuka and Musashi appeared as all five Ultras transform to fight the monster army. Through memories of Amate, Shohei and Yui were able to use it for all fruits from the Tree of Life to mature, allowing Orb and Cosmos to purify the War Deity and other Kugutsu victims. In a last resort tactic, Psyqueen tries to combine with the War Deity before all Ultras open fire and Orb rescuing Psychi from his death. After receiving commendation from his seniors, Gai returned to O-50 and received another mission in addition to Orb's new coloration (Orb Origin).
