= Yasuyuki Maekawa =

Japanese actor and model

- 前川 泰之
- Born: 26 November 1973 (age 52); Adachi, Tokyo, Japan
- Occupation: Actor
- Years active: 1993–2004 (as a fashion model); 2005– (as an actor)
- Agent: Oscar Promotion
- Notable work: Ore wa, Kimi no tameni koso Shini ni iku
- Television: Yume de Aimashou; Hanzawa Naoki
- Height: 186 cm (6 ft 1 in)
- Spouse: Maya Masai (m. 2007)
- Website: Official website

Yasuyuki Maekawa (前川 泰之, Maekawa Yasuyuki; born 26 November 1973) is a Japanese actor and former model. He was born in Adachi, Tokyo, and grew up in Saitama Prefecture. He is represented with the agency Oscar Promotion. He graduated from Meiji Gakuin Senior High School and Aoyama Gakuin University Law school. His wife is former Fuji Television announcer Maya Masai.

== Biography ==
For eleven years since 1993, he was a model in fashion magazines, etc. He acted as a fashion model at New York City, Paris, Tokyo, and Milan fashion shows.

On 13 April 2005, he declared his acting debut at the "2005 Debut Declaration Announcement Interview" affiliation by Oscar Promotion and turned into an actor. Play the role of a president of an IT company in the Tokyo Broadcasting System Television drama Yume de Aimashou starting on the following day on 14 April.

In 2007, the Toei Company film Ore wa, Kimi no tameni koso Shini ni iku played his first film role.

He received the "Model Star Award" at the "Asia Model Festival Awards" held in South Korea in January 2009

== Personal life ==
In his private life, he married former Fuji Television announcer Maya Masai on 15 March 2007. Their eldest daughter became their first child on 20 September of the same year, and later a boy who became their second child on 19 March 2011 was born.

His hobbies are going outdoors, fishing, and kickboxing. The "Royal Angler Award" which awarded to fishing enthusiasts in various fields in which he has been awarded in 2014.

== Modelling activities ==
=== Magazines ===
| Title | Publisher |
|---|---|
| Men's Club | Hachette Ladies and Gentlemen |
| Gainer | Kobunsha |
| Men's Ex | World Culture |

=== Shows ===
Title
Hermès
Giorgio Armani
Dolce & Gabbana
Hugo Boss

He appeared in numerous brands, fashion shows, etc.

== Acting activities ==
=== Television ===
| Year | Title | Role | Notes | Ref. |
|---|---|---|---|---|
| 2005 | Densha Otoko | Naoto Oikawa | | |
| 2007 | Fūrin Kazan | Yamagata Masakage | Taiga drama | |
| 2013 | Hanzawa Naoki | Motoki Tamiya | | |
| 2014 | Dear Sister | Ryutaro Shimizu | Episode 4 | |
| 2016 | Kakure Kiku | Shunpei Ueshima | | |
| 2016 | Sanada Maru | Kasuga Nobutatsu | Taiga drama | |
| 2016 | Ultraman Orb: The Origin Saga | Shinra | | |
| 2017 | Kamen Rider Build | Souichi Isurugi / Blood Stalk, Evolto (human form) | | |

=== Films ===
| Year | Title | Role | Notes | Ref. |
|---|---|---|---|---|
| 2007 | For Those We Love | Kanayama | | |
| 2015 | The Big Bee | Nishioka | | |
| 2016 | Will You Marry My Wife? | Takashi Nakajima | | |
| 2016 | L | | | |
| 2019 | I Was a Secret Bitch | | | |
| 2020 | Fukushima 50 | | | |
| 2020 | Apparel Designer | | | |
| 2021 | 189 | Yasukawa | | |
| 2022 | Mr. Osomatsu | Iyami | | |
| 2023 | Shylock's Children | | | |
| 2025 | Seppuku: The Sun Goes Down | | | |
| 2026 | Service Oath | | Lead role | |
