= Ultraman Orb: The Origin Saga =

2016 Japanese TV series

- Title card
- Genre: Superhero; Science Fantasy; Kaiju; Kyodai Hero
- Created by: Tsuburaya Productions
- Written by: Hirotoshi Kobayashi; Sotaro Hayashi; Hisako Kurosawa
- Directed by: Kazuya Konaka; Hideki Oka
- Starring: Hideo Ishiguro; Takaya Aoyagi; Saki Fukuda; Ayane; Asuka Shibuya; Yasuhisa Furuhara; Karen Miyazaki; Yasuyuki Maekawa; Takaaki Enoki; Izumi Motoya; Takeshi Tsuruno; Taiyo Sugiura; Takeshi Yoshioka; Hassei Takano
- Opening theme: "ULTRAMAN ORB" by Daisuke Asakura & Takeshi Tsuruno; "True Fighter" by FUTURE BOYZ
- Ending theme: "Ultraman Orb -Touch the Sun-" by Satori Shiraishi; "Hoshi-tachi no Kiseki" by Voyager
- Composer: Takao Konishi
- Country of origin: Japan
- Original language: Japanese
- No. of episodes: 12

Production
- Running time: 23–24 min. (per episode)

Original release
- Network: Amazon Video
- Release: December 26, 2016 – March 13, 2017

Related
- Ultraman Orb; Ultraman Geed

Ultraman Orb: The Origin Saga (ウルトラマンオーブ THE ORIGIN SAGA, Urutoraman Ōbu Ji Orijin Sāga) is a 2016 Japanese tokusatsu series, serving as a prequel to Ultraman Orb and the 21st entry (30th overall) in the Ultra Series. The series was exclusively released on Amazon Video in Japan starting from December 26, 2016 and is planned to be released in worldwide, with English and German subtitles available for international viewers.

Its main catchphrase is "In Prime, it's Ultra." (プライムで、ウルトラだ。, Puraimu de, Urutora da.).

== Story ==
Ultraman Orb: The Origin Saga occurs before the events of Ultraman Orb, featuring Gai Kurenai/Ultraman Orb and Jugglus Juggler as allies before Juggler's fall to darkness.

Far in the distant planet O-50, two young elite warriors named Gai and Juggler reached the unexplored mountain peak called Crusader's Peak and tried to achieve the power of light. The light chooses Gai and in turn bestowed him with the Orbcalibur to transform him into Ultraman Orb. Gai's first mission as the giant of light began as both him and Juggler participated in a conflict between Royal Planet Kanon and Psychi, a scientist who plans to use the Kugutsu carried by Space Devil Bezelbs to eliminate free will from the universe to create a new world under his regime. Along the way, Gai met with Asuka/Ultraman Dyna and Musashi/Ultraman Cosmos, both are Ultra Warriors from another universe who also interfered the battle. After the Kanon queen Amate transform into the War Deity, she was quickly infected by the Bezelb and almost destroy the planet's Tree of Life until the Ultras interfered and cured her. The death of Micott, a woman who admired Juggler for his swordsmanship caused the latter to acquire his transformation into his Demon Form and slayed the Tree of Life after seeing it as the source of all conflict. His action of almost endangering Kanon forced him to be banished from the planet while at the same time denouncing his role as Gai's supporter.

Meanwhile on Earth, two scientists Shohei and Yui discovered the Tree of Life's seed in an ancient temple 4,000 metres beneath Japan's sea level. As a result of touching the seed, Shohei was evolved, being able to contact Amate by the time her planet was under Psychi's invasion. The destruction of the Tree of Life caused said tree to grow on Earth as well, attracting Psychi's attention to go to said planet. After the series entered its second phase, the "Earth Arc" (地球編, Chikyū-hen), Gai entered Earth under Amate's orders to help Shohei protect the Tree of Life as he was joined by Gamu Takayama and Hiroya Fujimiya (both are protagonists of Ultraman Gaia) into the battle. When the Earth soldiers commenced their attacks on the Tree of Life, Amate stepped in and establish a contact with the Queen Bezelb until said monster sprung her trap to infect the War Deity. By this point, the Queen show its true colors by abandoning Psychi and plans to spread the Kugutsu towards the universe, resulting all life forms robbed of their free will and civilizations perish. Juggler interferes the battle again and rescued Ultraman Orb/Gai from the effects of Kugutsu under his own proxy to surpass the giants of light.

With the Queen perished by Juggler, Psychi made his final attempt by combining with her into Psyqueen and tries to destroy the Tree of Life. Gai joins his predecessors in the final battle while Shohei and Yui's will caused the Tree of Life's fruits to mature, allowing them to purify the War Deity and other Kugutsu victims. With all plan fails, Psyqueen tries to combine with the War Deity but the five Ultras open fire on the monster while Orb saved Psychi from his death. After being congratulated by his seniors, Gai visited the O-50 again where he received another mission, along with a black coloration added to Ultraman Orb, finally becoming Orb Origin.

== Episodes ==
| No. | Title | Written by | Original release date |
|---|---|---|---|
| 1 | "Shining Star"; Transliteration: "Kiraboshi" (Japanese: きらぼし ～煌星～) | Hirotoshi Kobayashi | December 26, 2016 |
| 2 | "Close Relations"; Transliteration: "Enishi" (Japanese: えにし ～所縁～) | Hirotoshi Kobayashi | January 2, 2017 |
| 3 | "The Echo"; Transliteration: "Kodama" (Japanese: こだま ～谺～) | Hirotoshi Kobayashi | January 9, 2017 |
| 4 | "The Pursuit"; Transliteration: "Atotomu" (Japanese: あととむ ～跡求～) | Sotaro Hayashi | January 16, 2017 |
| 5 | "Daybreak"; Transliteration: "Akatsuki" (Japanese: あかつき ～暁～) | Sotaro Hayashi | January 23, 2017 |
| 6 | "War Deity"; Transliteration: "Ikusagami" (Japanese: いくさがみ ～戦神～) | Sotaro Hayashi | January 30, 2017 |
| 7 | "Vertigo"; Transliteration: "Kururu" (Japanese: くるる ～眩る～) | Hirotoshi Kobayashi | February 6, 2017 |
| 8 | "Vibrations"; Transliteration: "Hibiki" (Japanese: ひびき ～響～) | Hisako Kurosawa | February 13, 2017 |
| 9 | "Reason"; Transliteration: "Kotowari" (Japanese: ことわり ～理～) | Hisako Kurosawa | February 20, 2017 |
| 10 | "Flower Storm"; Transliteration: "Hanaarashi" (Japanese: はなあらし ～花嵐～) | Sotaro Hayashi | February 27, 2017 |
| 11 | "Heat Haze"; Transliteration: "Kagerō" (Japanese: かげろう ～陽炎～) | Sotaro Hayashi | March 6, 2017 |
| 12 | "New World"; Transliteration: "Mahoroba" (Japanese: まほろば ～新世界～) | Hirotoshi Kobayashi | March 13, 2017 |

== Cast ==
- Gai (ガイ)/Ultraman Orb (Voice): Hideo Ishiguro (石黒 英雄, Ishiguro Hideo)
- Jugglus Juggler (ジャグラス・ジャグラー, Jagurasu Jagurā): Takaya Aoyagi (青柳 尊哉, Aoyagi Takaya)
- Amate (アマテ): Saki Fukuda (福田 沙紀, Fukuda Saki)
- Micott (ミコット, Mikotto): Ayane (文音)
- Ricca (リッカ, Rikka): Asuka Shibuya (渋谷 飛鳥, Shibuya Asuka)
- Shohei Moriwaki (森脇 翔平, Moriwaki Shōhei): Yasuhisa Furuhara (古原 靖久, Furuhara Yasuhisa)
- Yui Nishioka (西岡 結衣, Nishioka Yui): Karen Miyazaki (宮﨑 香蓮, Miyazaki Karen)
- Shinra (シンラ): Yasuyuki Maekawa (前川 泰之, Maekawa Yasuyuki)
- Raigo (ライゴウ, Raigō): Takaaki Enoki (榎木 孝明, Enoki Takaaki)
- Psychi (サイキ, Saiki): Izumi Motoya (和泉 元彌)
- Shin Asuka (アスカ・シン, Asuka Shin)/Ultraman Dyna (ウルトラマンダイナ, Urutoraman Daina; Voice): Takeshi Tsuruno (つるの 剛士, Tsuruno Takeshi)
- Musashi Haruno (春野 ムサシ, Haruno Musashi)/Ultraman Cosmos (ウルトラマンコスモス, Urutoraman Kosumosu; Voice): Taiyo Sugiura (杉浦 太陽, Sugiura Taiyō)
- Gamu Takayama (高山 我夢, Takayama Gamu)/Ultraman Gaia (ウルトラマンガイア, Urutoraman Gaia; Voice): Takeshi Yoshioka (吉岡 毅志, Yoshioka Takeshi)
- Hiroya Fujimiya (藤宮 博也, Fujimiya Hiroya)/Ultraman Agul (ウルトラマンアグル, Urutoraman Aguru; Voice): Hassei Takano (高野 八誠, Takano Hassei)
- Bugen (ブゲン): Takeyuki Yue (湯江 健幸, Yue Takeyuki)
- Yosuke Aoi (青井 洋介, Aoi Yōsuke): Mister Chin (ミスターちん, Misutā Chin)

=== Voice cast ===
- Partel (パーテル, Pāteru): Riho Iida (飯田 里穂, Iida Riho)

== Related media ==
- Writer Hirotoshi Kobayashi mentioned that The Origin Saga will have its episode 0, featuring the reason why Juggler and Gai climb on the Crusader's Peak to claim Orb's power.
- In celebration to the end of Ultraman Orb: The Origin Saga, Tsuburaya Productions aired a promotional clips that compile all unpublished cuts in the series. The cuts were narrated by Tesshō Genda (玄田 哲章, Genda Tesshō).

== Songs ==
Opening themes

- "ULTRAMAN ORB"
  - Lyrics: Makoto Asakura (麻倉 真琴, Asakura Makoto)
  - Composition & Arrangement: Daisuke Asakura (浅倉 大介, Asakura Daisuke)
  - Artists: Daisuke Asakura & Takeshi Tsuruno
  - Episodes: 1-7
- "True Fighter"
  - Lyrics: Sara Sakurai (櫻井 沙羅, Sakurai Sara)
  - Composition & Arrangement: Jeff Miyahara
  - Artists: FUTURE BOYZ
  - Episodes: 8-11
  During the final episode, this song is played as an ending theme.

Ending themes

- "Ultraman Orb -Touch the Sun-"
  - Singer-songwriter: Satori Shiraishi (シライシ 紗トリ, Shiraishi Satori)
  - Composition & Arrangement: Satori Shiraishi
  - Episodes: 1-7
- "Hoshi-tachi no Kiseki" (星たちの奇跡; lit. "Miracles of the Stars")
  - Lyrics, Composition & Arrangement: Wolves Unite
  - Artists: Voyager
  - Episodes: 8-11
