= Yasuhisa Furuhara =

Japanese actor (born 1986)

- 古原 靖久
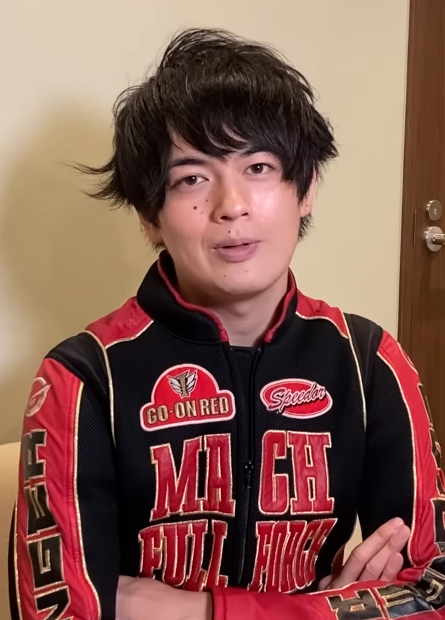
- Furuhara in 2022
- Born: 13 August 1986 (age 39); Kyoto, Japan
- Occupation: Actor
- Years active: 2005–present

Yasuhisa Furuhara (古原 靖久, Furuhara Yasuhisa; born 13 August 1986) is a Japanese actor. He made his first acting appearance in the television drama Nobuta wo Produce and rose to popularity in 2008 after starring in Engine Sentai Go-onger as Sosuke Esumi / Go-on Red.

== Early life ==
Furuhara's mother gave birth to him when she was 16. In 2024, Furuhara stated to Shūkan Bunshun that he was often neglected as a child, to the point that his diaper was not changed for several days, and rarely saw his parents at home. His parents divorced when he was 3 and his mother had him live in a children's home when he was 5 years old. Eventually, his mother abandoned him, and the last time he saw her was when he was 10 years old. At the children's home, he was often punished by his teachers and bullied by his seniors. Furuhara states, that he "does not have good memories" of his childhood up until he was a 6th grade elementary school student.

== Filmography ==
Television

- Nobuta wo Produce as Takuzo Wakui (NTV, 2005)
- The School of Water Business as Okuta (NTV, 2006)
- Shinuka to Omotta in Case 3 (NTV, 2007)
- Hanazakari no Kimitachi e as Taiyo Ogimachi (Fuji TV, 2007)
- Engine Sentai Go-onger as Sousuke Esumi/Go-On Red (TV Asahi, 2008)
- Kaizoku Sentai Gokaiger as Sousuke Esumi (ep. 35-36) (TV Asahi, 2011)
- Ultraman Orb: The Origin Saga as Shohei Moriwaki (Amazon Prime, 2016 - 2017)
- Bakuage Sentai Boonboomger as Sosuke Esumi / Go-On Red (ep. 12) (TV Asahi, 2024)

Film

- Engine Sentai Go-onger: Boom Boom! Bang Bang! GekijōBang!! (2008 Toei) as Sousuke Esumi/Go-On Red
- Engine Sentai Go-onger vs. Gekiranger (2009 Toei) as Sousuke Esumi/Go-On Red
- Samurai Sentai Shinkenger vs. Go-onger: GinmakuBang!! (2010 Toei) as Sousuke Esumi/Go-On Red
- Karate-Robo Zaborgar (2011) as The Younger Daimon
- Engine Sentai Go-onger: 10 Years Grand Prix (2018 Toei) as Sousuke Esumi/Go-on Red

== Other media ==
Stage

- Switch (2007)
