= Mahoroba =

Ancient Japanese word for a far-off land full of bliss and peace

Mahoroba is an ancient Japanese word describing a far-off land full of bliss and peace. It is roughly comparable to the western concepts of Arcadia, a place surrounded by mountains full of harmony and quiet.

Translations of the word into English in the 21st century include "promised land" and "the splendid land among the nations."

Mahoroba is now written only in hiragana as まほろば. The origins of the word are not clear; it is described in a poem in the ancient Kojiki (古事記) as being the perfect place in Yamato:

Poem from the Kojiki
| Original Spelling | Modernized Spelling | Romanized version |
|---|---|---|
| 夜麻登波 久爾能麻本呂婆 多多那豆久 阿袁加岐 夜麻碁母禮流 夜麻登志宇流波斯 | 大和は 国のまほろば たたなずく あおかき山ごもれる やまとしうるわし。 | Yamato wa Kuni no mahoroba Tatanazuku; Aokaki-yama gomoreru Yamato shi uruwashi. |

The original spelling employed Man'yogana, which have been replaced by the usual Japanese spelling using Kanji and Kana in the modernized version.

== Uses ==
- The Space Battleship Yamato had a sister-ship that was named Chō Jikū Senkan Mahoroba (The Ultimate Time Sweeper Mahoroba)
- Final Fantasy: Song Book - Mahoroba
- The anime/manga Mahoraba.
- In the anime Kannazuki no Miko, the story takes place in the village of Mahoroba.
- In the game Boktai 3: Sabata's Counterattack, the final boss battle takes place on the moon's capital city of Mahoroba.
- In the game Beatmania IIDX 16: Empress, there is a song called Mahoroba.
- In the game Arcaea, there is also a song called Mahoroba. These are not the same song.
- "The Man-yō Mahoroba Line" became in use for the common name of the West Japan Railway Company (JR West) Sakurai Line on March 13, 2010, the day of the diagram revision of JR Group.
- In the game Toukiden 2, the village the player plays in is called Mahoroba Village
- In 1984, Himekami published an EP named Mahoroba with a track also named the same.
- In 2025, Ningen Isu published a single named Mahoroba.
