= Ultra Galaxy Fight =

- The official Japanese version of the poster, with Ultra Dark Killer, New Generation Heroes, Ultraman Zero, Ultraman Ribut, Ultrawoman Grigio, X Darkness and Geed Darkness.
- Genre: Tokusatsu; Sci-Fi; Action/Adventure; Superhero; Kaiju
- Created by: Tsuburaya Productions
- Written by: Junichiro Ashiki
- Directed by: Koichi Sakamoto
- Country of origin: Japan
- Original languages: Japanese; English
- No. of episodes: 13 (NGH); 10 (TAC); 11(TDC)

Production
- Producers: Jun Konishi; Daisuke Kanemitsu
- Editor: Yusuke Murakami
- Running time: 5 minutes (mini episode cut), 50 minutes (full video), 58 minutes (director's cut) (NGH); 11-14 minutes (mini episode), 126 minutes (full video) (TAC)

Original release
- Network: YouTube; Tsuburaya Imagination (TDC)
- Release: September 29, 2019

Related
- Ultra Fight Orb; Sevenger Fight

Ultra Galaxy Fight (ウルトラギャラクシーファイト, Urutora Gyarakushī Faito) is a Japanese online miniseries produced by Tsuburaya Productions, based on the low-budget series Ultra Fight while being marketed for worldwide audiences through YouTube in both Japanese and English versions for viewers overseas. It was originally released from September 29, 2019, while coinciding with the television broadcast of Ultraman Taiga. Eight months after it ended, the series was announced to receive a sequel story in November 2020, followed by the third entry in 2022.

== Synopsis ==
=== Ultra Galaxy Fight: New Generation Heroes ===
The first series, Ultra Galaxy Fight: New Generation Heroes (ウルトラギャラクシーファイト ニュージェネレーションヒーローズ, Urutora Gyarakushī Faito Nyū Jenerēshon Hīrōzu), aired from September 29 to December 22, 2019. It follows after the end of Ultraman R/B the Movie and prelude to Ultraman Taiga with a total of 13 episodes.

In Planet Sundowin, Ultraman X and Geed were sent to apprehend Dark-killer after he terrorized the universe until their energies were stolen for the creation of X and Geed Darkness. The two copies defeated their counterparts and proceed to attack Orb on Planet O-50. Due to Zero's failure in protecting Grigio and ended up within the Dark-Killer Zone, the Ultra Brothers summon Rosso and Blu to their headquarters but they fly away before Taro can provide enough explanation, leading to their encounter with Etelgar. After saving a lone Ragon, Ribut bailed Rosso and Blu from Planet Penol whereas Victory and Ginga rescued Orb, X and Geed respectively.

Taro explained Dark-Killer's origin: a being of darkness born from the grudges of past monsters that the Ultra Brothers fought before. Taro was able to defeat him with the Ultra Brothers' help, but Dark-Killer was revived, conscripting the resurrected Dark Lugiel and Etelgar to the League of Darkness as he create armies of evil Ultras for intergalactic conquest. Using Zero and Grigio as hostages, Dark-Killer goaded the New Generation Heroes to Planet Tenebris, which they did so despite the possibility of getting into a trap. Orb, Geed and X stay behind to fight their copies, Ginga and Victory faced Lugiel and Etelgar in the Dark Palace as Rosso and Blu entered the Dark-Killer Zone, only to be ambushed by the namesake villain himself. Meanwhile, Ribut unmasked Tregear as the mysterious benefactor of the League of Darkness and attempted to arrest him. Under memories of Ultraman Zero, the first five Ultras harnessed Zero's power to destroy their revived rivals. Grigio managed to muster enough strength to get past Zero Darkness to recharge her brothers, giving them a chance of counterattack by forming Ultraman Ruebe and killing both Zero Darkness and Ultra Dark-Killer.

In an attempt to gain advantage against the New Generation Heroes, Tregear revived Zero Darkness and Dark-Killer (the latter enlarged to 200 meters) before escaping from Ribut and send the Red Kings as his distraction. After transforming Zero into Zero Beyond for his fight with Zero Darkness, the New Generation Heroes accessed their strongest forms for the final battle. The insane Dark-Killer made his desperate attempt by recreating the evil Ultramen to consume them and grew larger. Under Taro's instructions, the New Generation Heroes charged the Strium Brace for Ginga Strium to perform New Generation Dynamite. While Dark-Killer's fate was guaranteed not to return, Zero revealed that Grigio's kidnapping was to prevent the formation of Groob. The only person other than the Ultras to know about this is none other than Tregear, who voiced his intent to attack the Land of Light and left immediately. The rest of the New Generation Heroes chased after the rogue Ultra as Zero sent Grigio back to her home world, wanting her to protect Ayaka City in her brothers' absence.

=== Ultra Galaxy Fight: The Absolute Conspiracy ===
The second series, Ultra Galaxy Fight: The Absolute Conspiracy (ウルトラギャラクシーファイト 大いなる陰謀, Urutora Gyarakushī Faito Ōinaru Inbō), aired as a 10-episode format with the duration of 10 minutes per episode from November 22, 2020, to January 13, 2021. The story takes place after the end of Ultraman Taiga The Movie and serving as the prelude to Ultraman Z.

Chapter 1: The Beginning (動き出す陰謀, Ugokidasu Inbō; The Conspiracy Starts) (episodes 1-3)

Prior to his membership in the Galaxy Rescue Force, Ribut was a civilization guardian alongside Ultraman Max and investigated the Planet Mikarito's sudden depletion of energy. Discovering the Maga-Orochi egg to be its source of problem, their attempt at attacking it provoked Hellberus into defending the egg and Alien Sran infecting Max with the Gudis Cells to turn him into Maga-Orochi's ration. At the same time in Planet Kanon, 80 defended Yullian and Sora when Leugocyte attacked them during their peaceful negotiation on Planet Kanon. Both incidents were reported to the Inter-Galactic Defense Force, where a rescue operation was held to create an antidote to save Max while Ribut undergoes training from Great and Powered.

80 on the other hand lead a strike force consist of Neos and Seven 21 in tracking Leugocyte to Planet Feed where the two join forces with Cosmos and Justice, the latter two arriving in the middle of their investigation on behalf of Delacion. Tartarus appeared and challenged them when both Leugocyte and Gymaira were killed, but was forced to retreat due to Ultraman Legend's presence.

After receiving his new weapons once his training concluded, Ribut and his instructors brought the Gudis Vaccine created by Hikari and Sora to cure Max of the Gudis Cells, but Maga-Orochi had awakened by that point. Xenon joins the fray by replenishing Max's energy and all three Civilization Guardians finished the planet eater with their attacks. After the incident, Ribut and Sora were awarded with membership within the Galaxy Rescue Force. Alien Sran survived his defeat, but was killed by Tartarus for his incompetence. Tartarus left the scene with a new plan in mind, with his presence sensed by Ultraman King.

Chapter 2: The Divergence (交錯する物語, Kōsakusuru Monogatari; Interlacing Stories) (episodes 4-6)

In addition to Alien Bat, Zett and Reibatos, Absolute Tartarus begins assembling a group of his own in against the Ultra Warriors. Tartarus scouted various villains from different points in the Land of Light's history, including Juda and Mold from their active period. To recruit the fallen Ultras, he jumped into the past before any of them would convert to the darkness. He started off by traversing into the era of Great Ultra War, where the Land of Light had recently fending off against Alien Empera and his army. Tartarus took advantage of Ultraman Belial's growing jealousy against Ken by preventing his eventual fusion with Rayblood. He proceed to do the same with a young Ultraman Tregear, who was already disillusioned with Hikari's quest for vengeance against Bogarl prior to forming a pact with Grimdo.

In the present era, the Gua Army brothers fought against the original six Ultra Brothers under the impression to summon the Andro Defense Force, but was killed by Taro's Cosmo Miracle Beam. Although in Early Styles, Belial and Tregear took advantage of their recently acquired Absolutian powers to lay waste on the Ultra Brothers and came close to defeating Ultraman Zero before Tartarus called off the fight, escorting the fallen Ultras back to The Kingdom. Upon discovering of Tartarus' plan to threaten both the timeline and parallel universes, Father of Ultra decided to enlist Zero for his ability to travel between dimensions.

Chapter 3: The Appearance (明かされし野望, Akasareshi Yabō; Ambitions Revealed) (episodes 7-10)

Taking place after their fight with Grimdo, the Tri-Squad continue their training and found themselves against Zett, an anti-Ultraman life form and his army of Zettons. Zero had jumped into various dimensions to recruit Joneus and Grigio into his newly formed Ultra League, bringing along Ribut and Andro Melos by sending them to save the Tri-Squad. In order to prepare for their upcoming fight with Tartarus' faction, the Tri-Squad train themselves as Taiga met a rookie Ultraman Z and his master, Mebius. A few days later, the convoy that was set to bring Yullian for a peaceful negotiation on Planet Kanon was hunted down by Zett and his Zetton Army on Planet Ebil, leaving her and 80 as survivors of the attacks. Mebius, Taiga and Z went to their rescue, but Z's immaturity and inexperience became a hindrance. The Ultra League arrived to further assist the battle and Zero try to exert his full power as Ultimate Shining Zero, but failed to intercept Tartarus in his pocket dimension Narak. Although Zett was killed by the combined effort of Taiga and Ultraman Z, Tartarus successfully kidnapped Yullian. Absolute Tartarus revealed that he plans to use Yullian as a hostage to force the Ultras into surrendering the Land of Light for his people, Absolutian, to populate as their new home. Before they could make any progress, Hikari alarmed the theft of Ultra Medals by Genegarg as Zero and Z left to pursue the monster. Yullian on the other hand was placed into Narak alongside another figure in captivity.

=== Ultra Galaxy Fight: The Destined Crossroad ===
After the final episode of The Absolute Conspiracy, a sequel work was announced to be under progress. Writer Junichiro Ashiki confirmed his participation in his Twitter account. The title is later announced to be Ultra Galaxy Fight: The Destined Crossroad (ウルトラギャラクシーファイト 運命の衝突, Urutora Gyarakushī Faito Unmei no Shōtotsu) during an online event. The prologue of the miniseries first aired on December 17, 2021, in the Ultraman Connection Live online livestream event in Ultraman Connection website in English dub. The Destined Crossroad aired in Tsuburaya Imagination from April 29 to July 1, 2022, with its English dub on May 29, 2022, both of which are under the pay-per-view contents.

In the prologue, Cosmos managed to fend off against a squad of Absolutians who invaded Planet Juran. Members of the Inter-Galactic Defense Force reorganized their plans after Yullian's kidnapping, with Mebius in particular continues to train the other Ultras for their upcoming war with the Absolutians. Returning from his pursuit against Genegarg, Zero approaches Joneus and seeks to further train himself in against Tartarus. Ultraman King however disagree with the idea and tries to find a way to avoid the conflict between both races.

The Tri-Squad decided to recruit the New Generation Heroes as part of the reformed Ultra League, only to find themselves assisting their seniors (including Z after his fight with Destrudos) in their hunt for the Devil Splinters, especially when Gina Spectre joins the fray to steal them. While training with Mebius, Grigio became fast friends with Ultraman Zearth, Nice and Boy, as they later dragged into the conflict with the New Generation Heroes and The Kingdom. Seeing Gina's emotional pain of losing her brothers, Grigio's attempt at saving her were all for naught when she was forcefully fused into Gua Spectre. At the same time, Absolute Titan was assigned to attack Ultraman Noa at Planet Babel, leading to a confrontation with the Ultra Force and eventually getting trapped into a Meta Field, wherein his cooperation with Ribut was used as a test by Nexus/Noa to confirm his believes that the two race can achieve a peaceful coexistence. Ribut was sent back to be revived after losing his life on Babel, while Zero faces Tartarus using his newfound ability to become unpredictable.

As Tartarus threatens to execute Yullian, the Land of Light assembles a rescue squad (later joined by Ultraman Justice) to storm The Kingdom's Central Planet to rescue the princess, additionally saving an Ultraman named Regulos, who was also held captive as part of The Kingdom's experimentation. The Absolutians' attempt at chasing them leads to a confrontation with the Inter-Galactic Defense Force in Planet Blizzard. While Titan, Belial and Tregear left the fight after being dispirited, the loss of a majority of his forces convinces Tartarus to unleash his full power on his opponents. King intervenes at the last minute as their crossfire created a black hole that drags Ribut, Tartarus and Diavolo's heart into it. As Ribut was declared missing in action, The Kingdom went into a temporary hiding as Belial plans on deserting his employers to obtain power on his own merit. On the other hand, Regulos joins the Ultras on training for their upcoming fight with The Kingdom, while Ultraman King, Zoffy, Father and Mother of Ultra and Yullian plan on seeking the Absolutians' lord in hopes that both of their race can reach a peaceful solution.

Ultraman Z left to retrieve Haruki and returns to the latter's Earth, while the black hole from Planet Blizzard sends Ribut, Tartarus and a revived Diavolo to the world of Eternity Core, observing the fight between Ultraman Trigger and the Giants of Darkness taking place. Both of these events lead to the characters' respective guest appearances in episodes 7 and 14 of Ultraman Trigger: New Generation Tiga.

== Voice cast ==
=== Main ===
Japanese

- Ultraman Zero (ウルトラマンゼロ, Urutoraman Zero): Mamoru Miyano (宮野 真守, Miyano Mamoru)
- Ultrawoman Grigio (ウルトラウーマングリージョ, Urutoraūman Gurījo): Arisa Sonohara (其原 有沙, Sonohara Arisa)
- Ultraman Ribut (ウルトラマンリブット, Urutoraman Ributto): Wataru Komada (駒田 航, Komada Wataru)
- Ultraman Tregear (ウルトラマントレギア, Urutoraman Toregia): Yuma Uchida (内田 雄馬, Uchida Yūma)

English

- Ultrawoman Grigio: Rumiko Varnes
- Ultraman Taro: Bill Sullivan
- Ultraman Tregear: Michael Rhys

=== New Generation Heroes-exclusives ===
Japanese

- Ultraman Ginga (ウルトラマンギンガ, Urutoraman Ginga): Takuya Negishi (根岸 拓哉, Negishi Takuya)
- Ultraman Victory (ウルトラマンビクトリー, Urutoraman Bikutorī): Kiyotaka Uji (宇治 清高, Uji Kiyotaka)
- Ultraman X (ウルトラマンエックス, Urutoraman Ekkusu): Kensuke Takahashi (高橋 健介, Takahashi Kensuke)
- Ultraman Orb (ウルトラマンオーブ, Urutoraman Ōbu): Hideo Ishiguro (石黒 英雄, Ishiguro Hideo)
- Ultraman Geed (ウルトラマンジード, Urutoraman Jīdo): Tatsuomi Hamada (濱田 龍臣, Hamada Tatsuomi)
- Ultraman Rosso (ウルトラマンロッソ, Urutoraman Rosso): Yuya Hirata (平田 雄也, Hirata Yūya)
- Ultraman Blu (ウルトラマンブル, Urutoraman Buru): Ryosuke Koike (小池 亮介, Koike Ryōsuke)
- Ultraman Taro (ウルトラマンタロウ, Urutoraman Tarō): Hiroya Ishimaru (石丸 博也, Ishimaru Hiroya)
- Dark Lugiel (ダークルギエル, Dāku Rugieru): Tomokazu Sugita (杉田 智和, Sugita Tomokazu)
- Etelgar (エタルガー, Etarugā): Tatsuhisa Suzuki (鈴木 達央, Suzuki Tatsuhisa)
- Ultra Dark-Killer (ウルトラダークキラー, Urutora Dāku Kirā): Kōichi Toshima (外島 孝一, Toshima Kōichi)

English

- Ultraman Ginga: Peter von Gomm
- Ultraman Victory: Michael Jose Rivas-Micoud
- Ultraman X: Mark Stein
- Ultraman Orb: Chris Wells
- Ultraman Geed: Dario Toda
- Ultraman Rosso: Jeff Manning
- Ultraman Blu: Ryan Drees
- Ultraman Zero: Jack Merluzzi
- Ultraman Ribut: Iain Gibb
- Dark Lugiel: Guy Perryman
- Etelgar: Lyle Carr
- Ultra Dark-Killer: Eric Kelso

=== The Absolute Conspiracy-exclusives ===
Japanese

- Ultraman Z (ウルトラマンゼット, Urutoraman Zetto): Tasuku Hatanaka (畠中 祐, Hanata Tasuku)
- Ultraman Taiga (ウルトラマンタイガ, Urutoraman Taiga): Takuma Terashima (寺島 拓篤, Terashima Takuma)
- Ultraman Titas (ウルトラマンタイタス, Urutoraman Taitasu): Satoshi Hino (日野 聡, Hino Satoshi)
- Ultraman Fuma (ウルトラマンフーマ, Urutoraman Fūma): Shōta Hayama (葉山 翔太, Hayama Shōta)
- Ultraman Max (ウルトラマンマックス, Urutoraman Makkusu): Kazuya Nakai (中井 和哉, Nakai Kazuya)
- Ultraman Mebius (ウルトラマンメビウス, Urutoraman Mebiusu): Jun Fukuyama (福山 潤, Fukuyama Jun)
- Ultraman Hikari (ウルトラマンヒカリ, Urutoraman Hikari): Keiichi Nanba (難波 圭一, Nanba Keiichi)
- Ultraman Belial (ウルトラマンベリアル, Urutoraman Beriaru): Yūki Ono (小野 友樹, Ono Yūki)
- Absolute Tartarus (アブソリュートタルタロス, Abusoryūto Tarutarosu): Junichi Suwabe (諏訪部 順一, Suwabe Jun'ichi)
- Ultraman Great (ウルトラマングレート, Urutoraman Gurēto), Alien Empera (エンペラ星人, Enpera Seijin): Tomokazu Seki (関 智一, Seki Tomokazu)
- Ultraman Powered (ウルトラマンパワード, Urutoraman Pawādo): Toshiyuki Morikawa (森川 智之, Morikawa Toshiyuki)
- Ultraman 80 (ウルトラマン80, Urutoraman Eiti): Hatsunori Hasegawa (長谷川 初範, Hasegawa Hatsunori)
- Yullian (ユリアン, Yurian): Haruka Tomatsu (戸松 遥, Tomatsu Haruka)
- Father of Ultra (ウルトラの父, Urutora no Chichi): Hajime Iijima (飯島 肇, Iijima Hajime)
- Mother of Ultra (ウルトラの母, Urutora no Haha): Suzuko Mimori (三森 すずこ, Mimori Suzuko)
- Zoffy (ゾフィー, Zofī): Shunsuke Takeuchi (武内 駿輔, Takeuchi Shunsuke)
- Ultraman Cosmos (ウルトラマンコスモス, Urutoraman Kosumosu): Taiyo Sugiura (杉浦 太陽, Sugiura Taiyō)
- Ultraman Justice (ウルトラマンジャスティス, Urutoraman Jasutisu), Sora (ソラ): Megumi Han (潘 めぐみ, Han Megumi)
- Zett (ゼット, Zetto): Tomokazu Sugita
- Ultraman Taro: Hiroya Ishimaru, Showtaro Morikubo (森久保 祥太郎, Morikubo Shōtarō) (young)
- Ultraman Joneus (ウルトラマンジョーニアス, Urutoraman Jōniasu), Juda Spectre (ジュダ・スペクター, Juda Supekutā): Nobuaki Kanemitsu (金光 宣明, Kanemitsu Nobuaki)
- Andro Melos (アンドロメロス, Andoro Merosu): Tomohiro Yamaguchi (山口 智広, Yamaguchi Tomohiro)
- Ultraman Neos (ウルトラマンネオス, Urutoraman Neosu): Ryuya Yazuka (八塚 竜也, Yazuka Ryūya)
- Ultraseven 21 (ウルトラセブン21, Urutorasebun Tsū Wan): Kenta Matsumoto (松本 健太, Matsumoto Kenta)
- Ultraman Xenon (ウルトラマンゼノン, Urutoraman Zenon): Ryota Iwasaki (岩崎 諒太, Iwasaki Ryōta)
- Alien Sran (スラン星人, Suran Seijin): You Murakami (村上 ヨウ, Murakami Yō)
- Queen Izana (イザナ女王, Izana-joō): Kei Shindō (真堂 圭, Shindō Kei)
- Alien Nackle (ナックル星人, Nakkuru Seijin): Tetsuo Kishi (岸 哲生, Kishi Tetsuo)
- Reibatos (レイバトス, Reibatosu), Mold Spectre (モルド・スペクター, Morudo Supekutā): Holly Kaneko (金子 はりい, Kaneko Harii)
- Alien Bat (バット星人, Batto Seijin): Munetoshi Takubo (田久保 宗稔, Takubo Munetoshi)

English

- Absolute Tartarus: Walter Roberts
- Ultraman Zero, Ultraman Great: Eric Kelso
- Ultraman Ribut, Ultraseven 21: Josh Keller
- Ultraman Cosmos, Ultraman Z: Peter Von Gomm
- Ultraman Belial: Jack Merluzzi
- Father of Ultra: Alexander W. Hunter
- Zoffy, Ultraman Joneus: Ryan Drees
- Ultraman Max, Ultraman Mebius: Maxwell Powers
- Ultraman Taiga: Matthew Masaru Barron
- Ultraman Neos, Ultraman Titas, Andro Melos: Jeff Manning
- Ultraman Fuma, Ultraman Hikari: Chris Wells
- Ultraman 80, Ultraman Xenon: Iain Gibb
- Yullian, Mother of Ultra: Hannah Grace
- Ultraman Powered: Kane Kosugi (Note: Kane also provided the grunts of Ultraman Powered in both languages.)
- Ultraman Justice: Rumiko Varnes

=== The Destined Crossroad-exclusives ===
Japanese

- Ultraman Regulos (ウルトラマンレグロス, Urutoraman Regurosu): Shugo Nakamura (仲村 宗悟, Nakamura Shūgo)
- Ultraman (ウルトラマン, Urutoraman): Takahiro Sakurai (櫻井 孝宏, Sakurai Takahiro)
- Ultraseven (ウルトラセブン, Urutorasebun): Hiroki Tōchi (東地 宏樹, Tōchi Hiroki)
- Ultraman Jack (ウルトラマンジャック, Urutoraman Jakku): Shin-ichiro Miki (三木 眞一郎, Miki Shin'ichirō)
- Ultraman Ace (ウルトラマンエース, Urutoraman Ēsu): Tomokazu Seki
- Ultraman Leo (ウルトラマンレオ, Urutoraman Reo): Yoshimasa Hosoya (細谷 佳正, Hosoya Yoshimasa)
- Astra (アストラ, Asutora): Takahiro Mizushima (水島 大宙, Mizushima Takahiro)
- Ultraman Zearth (ウルトラマンゼアス, Urutoraman Zeasu): You Murakami
- Ultraman Boy (ウルトラマンボーイ, Urutoraman Bōi): Kagami Kawazu (河津 香賀美, Kawazu Kagami)
- Ultraman Nice (ウルトラマンナイス, Urutoraman Naisu): Hiroshi Miyasaka (宮坂 ひろし, Miyasaka Hiroshi)
- Ultraman Scott (ウルトラマンスコット, Urutoraman Sukotto): Tōru Furuya (古谷 徹, Furuya Tōru)
- Ultraman Chuck (ウルトラマンチャック, Urutoraman Chakku): Masaki Terasoma (てらそま まさき, Terasoma Masaki)
- Ultrawoman Beth (ウルトラウーマンベス, Urutoraūman Besu): Asami Seto (瀬戸 麻沙美, Seto Asami)
- Gina Spectre (ギナ・スペクター, Gina Supekutā): Ayaka Nanase (七瀬 彩夏, Nanase Ayaka)
- Ultrawoman Grigio Darkness (ウルトラウーマングリージョダークネス, Urutoraūman Gurījo Dākunesu): Arisa Sonohara
- Ultraman King (ウルトラマンキング, Urutoraman Kingu): Nobuyuki Hiyama (檜山 修之, Hiyama Nobuyuki)
- Absolute Diavolo (アブソリュートディアボロ, Abusoryūto Diaboro): Teruaki Ogawa (小川 輝晃, Ogawa Teruaki)
- Absolute Titan (アブソリュートティターン, Abusoryūto Titān): Hiroki Yasumoto (安元 洋貴, Yasumoto Hiroki)
- Ultraman Ginga: Takuya Negishi
- Ultraman Victory: Kiyotaka Uji
- Ultraman X: Kensuke Takahashi
- Ultraman Orb: Hideo Ishiguro
- Ultraman Geed: Tatsuomi Hamada
- Ultraman Rosso: Yuya Hirata
- Ultraman Blu: Ryosuke Koike
- Ultraman Taiga: Takuma Terashima
- Ultraman Titas: Satoshi Hino
- Ultraman Fuma: Shōta Hayama
- Ultraman Z: Tasuku Hatanaka
- Ultraman Mebius: Jun Fukuyama
- Ultraman Hikari: Keiichi Nanba
- Ultraman Belial: Yūki Ono
- Absolute Tartarus: Junichi Suwabe
- Ultraman 80: Hatsunori Hasegawa
- Yullian: Haruka Tomatsu
- Ultraman Taro: Showtaro Morikubo
- Father of Ultra: Hajime Iijima
- Mother of Ultra: Suzuko Mimori
- Zoffy: Shunsuke Takeuchi
- Ultraman Cosmos: Taiyo Sugiura
- Ultraman Joneus: Nobuaki Kanemitsu
- Sora: Megumi Han
- Andro Melos: Tomohiro Yamaguchi
- Queen Izana: Kei Shindō
- Reibatos: Holly Kaneko
- Alien Bat: Munetoshi Takubo

English

- Absolute Tartarus: Walter Roberts
- Ultraman Zero: Eric Kelso
- Ultraman Ribut: Josh Keller
- Ultraman Cosmos, Ultraman Ginga, Ultraman Z: Peter Von Gomm
- Ultraman Belial, Beliarok: Jack Merluzzi
- Father of Ultra, Ultraman: Alexander Hunter
- Zoffy, Ultraman Joneus, Ultraman Blu: Ryan Drees
- Ultraman Mebius: Maxwell Powers
- Ultraman Taiga, Astra: Matthew Masaru Barron
- Andro Melos, Ultraman Rosso and Ultraman Titas: Jeff Manning
- Ultraman Hikari, Ultraman Orb and Ultraman Fuma: Chris Wells
- Ultraman 80, Ultraman Leo, Ultraman Xenon: Iain Gibb
- Yullian, Mother of Ultra: Hannah Grace
- Ultraman King, Ultraman Ace: Charles Glover
- Absolute Diavolo: Dennis Falt
- Absolute Titan: Bob Werley (Prologue), Douglas Kirk
- Ultraman Jack: Douglas Kirk
- Ultraman Regulos: Vinay Murthy
- Ultraman Zearth: Robert Baldwin
- Ultraman Nice: Ike Nwala
- Gina Specter and Ultraman Boy: Soness Stevens
- Ultraman Victory: Michael Jose Rivas-Micoud
- Ultraman X: Mark Stein
- Ultraman Scott: Dante Carver
- Ultrawoman Beth: Maria Theresa Gow
- Ultraman Chuck: Sean Nichols
- Father of Ultra, Ultraman: Alexander Hunter
- Mother of Ultra, Yullian: Hannah Grace

== Production ==
New Generation Heroes

The special was conceived by Koichi Sakamoto, who was the director of past Ultra Series Ultraman Ginga S and Ultraman Geed, with Galaxy Fight is his third spin-off direction after Ultra Fight Victory and Ultra Fight Orb. In an interview conducted by Tamashii Nations, Sakamoto revealed that the reason Galaxy Fight will be aired on YouTube is due to the overseas popularity of Ultra Series, with Asian region nations such as Indonesia, Malaysia, Thailand and Vietnam, while the real challenge comes in the series separating into 5 minutes per episodes. In comparison to television series, he found that spin-off series provided him with more creativity to generate ideas for the scene, with such example being Ultra Fight Orb's introduction to Lightning Attacker and Emerium Slugger. The inclusion of enemy characters such as Dark Lugiel, Etelgar, Ultra Dark Killer, X and Geed Darkness was already planned from the start as Hikaru Raido, the human host of Ultraman Ginga was chosen as the lead of New Generation Heroes due to his close image with a typical shonen manga protagonist. On September 24, 2019, Tsuburaya unveils additional information, such as synopsis, theme song, cast list and the appearance of Ultraman Ribut since his 2014 appearance in the Malaysian animation series Upin & Ipin.

The Director's cut version of the entire series was initially released for limited screening on November 14, 2019, in Shinjuku Piccadilly Cinema. New Generation Heroes receive its Blu-ray and DVD releases on February 27, 2020, with the former includes director's cut version of certain scenes and commentary from the director Sakamoto himself. Limited releases in Amazon Japan will include a 2L Visual Sheet of Ultraman Geed Darkness. Additional scenes included in the disc provided the video with additional duration of 8 minutes.

The Absolute Conspiracy

Koichi Sakamoto stated that the production behind The Absolute Conspiracy was made in response to the popularity of New Generation Heroes, as well as the success of the English dubbing and its easier accessibility through YouTube on mobile devices. Whereas the previous instalments had the appearance of a "festival", Sakamoto aimed for The Absolute Conspiracy for individual focus of different Ultras in their respective eras, hence the series' 10 episodes are separated and categorized into three chapters.

The first chapter, The Beginning, focuses on Ultraman Ribut as the main character for his in-depth exploration of his past prior to his recruitment in the Galaxy Rescue Force. Sakamoto draws inspiration from Mamoru Uchiyama's The Ultraman manga series over its space opera theme, carrying it over from the 2009 movie Mega Monster Battle: Ultra Galaxy. Inclusions of Ultraman 80, Great, Neos, Seven 21 and Max are due to their series celebrating their milestone anniversaries, while Powered, Cosmos and Justice were in hopes of further expanding their characters after their last live action appearances. Knowing full well that Great and Powered's series had their filming in overseas, Sakamoto consciously study and retain their fight styles in the miniseries; Sumo for Great, while Karate for Powered. The Divergence has fallen Ultras from the Land of Light, Belial and Tregear, as viewpoint characters by focusing on their past prior to their fall from grace. Belial's past interwinds with those of Father of Ultra and Mother of Ultra. The Ultimate Wars, an event that was originally mentioned in episode 25 of Ultraman Taro, is expanded as part of Belial and Father of Ultra's past in their fight against Alien Empera. Meanwhile, Tregear was given a light-blue form that depicted his time before forming his pact with Grimdo. Sakamoto highlighted that Belial and Tregear has different backgrounds and personalities, but they will further develop their characters in the future. The Appearance had Zero, the Tri-Squad and Z sharing the baton of viewpoint character, as well as developing the relationship between Zero and Taiga. The addition of Ultraman Joneus and Andro Melos is due to writer Junichiro Ashiki being a fan of The Ultraman, while Melos himself was due to Sakamoto's history of working with characters from his titular series. Andro Melos' fighting style also takes cues from the stunt team Ono Kenyukai, known for their contributions in the Kamen Rider series.

Although production of the miniseries had long started, The Absolute Conspiracy was announced by Tsuburaya Productions on August 20, 2020, the same day their YouTube channel receive their YouTube Creator Awards.

== Spin-off program ==
=== Ultraman Regulos ===
On the same day of the final episode of The Destined Crossroad distributed on Tsuburaya Imagination, Tsuburaya Productions announced that a new spin-off program in the making, featuring the character Ultraman Regulos on his upcoming eponymous media. Shugo Nakamura is confirmed to reprise his role as the Ultra.

=== Ultraman Regulos: First Mission ===
Ultraman Regulos: First Mission (ウルトラマンレグロス ファーストミッション, Urutoraman Regurosu Fāsuto Misshon) is an 18 minute spin-off sequel to The Destined Crossroad, chronicling on the events after the Ultras' fight against the Absolutians. In it, Sora went into trouble during an investigation on Planet Maijii, while Regulos embarks on a rescue mission to live up to the true meaning of the Cosmo Beast emblems on his arms. The spin-off will be available in both Japanese and English releases in 2023, with early screening to be made available in the Ultra Heroes EXPO 2023.

== Songs ==
=== New Generation Heroes songs ===
Opening and ending themes

- "Ultra Spiral"
  - Lyrics: TAKERU, Chiaki Seshimo (瀬下 千晶, Seshimo Chiaki)
  - Composition & Arrangement: Takao Konishi (小西 貴雄, Konishi Takao)
  - Artist: Voyager (ボイジャー, Boijā)

Insert themes

- "Ultraman Ginga no Uta 2015" (ウルトラマンギンガの歌 2015, Urutoraman Ginga no Uta Nisenjūgo; "The Song of Ultraman Ginga 2015")
  - Lyrics: Hideki Tama (田靡 秀樹, Tama Hideki), Sei Okazaki (岡崎 聖, Okazaki Sei)
  - Composition & Arrangement: Takao Konishi
  - Artist: Voyager with Hikaru & Show (Takuya Negishi & Kiyotaka Uji) feat. Takamiy
- "Susume! Ultraman Zero" (すすめ! ウルトラマンゼロ, Susume! Urutoraman Zero; "Let's Go! Ultraman Zero")
  - Lyrics: Hideki Tama, Tomohiro Yamaguchi (山口 智大, Yamaguchi Tomohiro)
  - Composition & Arrangement: Takao Konishi
- "Hands"
  - Lyrics: Kentaro Sonoda (園田 健太郎, Sonoda Kentarō)
  - Composition & Arrangement: Kentaro Sonoda, Tsubasa Ito (伊藤 翼, Itō Tsubasa)
  - Artist: Masayoshi Ōishi (オーイシ マサヨシ, Ōishi Masayoshi)
- "Orb no Inori" (オーブの祈り, Ōbu no Inori; "Orb's Prayer")
  - Lyrics & Composition: Toshihiko Takamizawa (高見沢 俊彦, Takamizawa Toshihiko)
  - Arrangement: Toshihiko Takamizawa with Yuichiro Honda (本田 優一郎, Honda Yūichirō)
  - Artist: Ichiro Mizuki (水木 一郎, Mizuki Ichirō) with Voyager
- "Ultraman X" (ウルトラマンX, Urutoraman Ekkusu)
  - Lyrics: Masato Ochi (おち まさと, Ochi Masato)
  - Composition & Arrangement: Takao Konishi
  - Artist: Voyager feat. Daichi Ozora (Kensuke Takahashi)
- "Geed no Akashi" (GEEDの証, Jīdo no Akashi; "The Symbol of Geed")
  - Lyrics: Sumiyo Mutsumi (六ツ見 純代, Mutsumi Sumiyo)
  - Composition & Arrangement: Kenji Kawai (川井 憲次, Kawai Kenji)
  - Artist: Riku Asakura (Tatsuomi Hamada) with Voyager
- "Ultraman Victory no Uta" (ウルトラマンビクトリーの歌, Urutoraman Bikutorī no Uta; "The Song of Ultraman Victory")
  - Lyrics: Sei Okazaki
  - Composition & Arrangement: Takao Konishi
  - Artist: Voyager
- "Ready To Beat"
  - Lyrics: Daisuke Kanemitsu (金光 大輔, Kanemitsu Daisuke)
  - Composition & Arrangement: Yuji Hamasaki (ハマサキ ユウジ, Hamasaki Yūji)
  - Artist: MIKOTO, Shuri Miyumi (海弓 シュリ, Miyumi Shuri)
- "Over The Horizon"
  - Lyrics: Daisuke Kanemitsu
  - Composition & Arrangement: Yuji Hamasaki
  - Artist: Voyager
- "Kirameku Mirai ~Yume no Ginga e~" (キラメク未来 ～夢の銀河へ～; "Sparkling Future ~To the Galaxy of Dreams~")
  - Lyrics: Hideki Tama
  - Composition & Arrangement: Takao Konishi
  - Artist: Voyager feat. Ultraman Ginga (Tomokazu Sugita)

=== The Absolute Conspiracy songs ===
Opening theme

- "ZERO to INFINITY"
  - Composition: Erde, Daniel Durn, Katrine "Neya" Klith
  - Arrangement: Erde
  - Lyrics & Artist: Mamoru Miyano

Ending theme

- "RESTART"
  - Lyrics: TAKERU, Chiaki Seshimo
  - Composition & Arrangement: Takao Konishi
  - Artist: Voyager

Insert themes

- "Ultraman 80" (ウルトラマン80, Urutoraman Eiti)
  - Lyrics: Michio Yamagami (山上 路夫, Yamagami Michio)
  - Composition & Arrangement: Noboru Kimura (木村 昇, Kimura Noboru)
  - Artist: TALIZMAN
- "Ultraman Neos TYPE 2001" (ウルトラマンネオス TYPE 2001, Urutoraman Neosu Taipu Nisen-ichi)
  - Lyrics: Gorō Matsui (松井 五郎, Matsui Gorō)
  - Composition: Kisaburō Suzuki (鈴木 キサブロー, Suzuki Kisaburō)
  - Arrangement: Kazuya Daimon (大門 一也, Daimon Kazuya)
  - Artist: Project DMM
- "Spirit"
  - Lyrics: Gorō Matsui
  - Composition: KATSUMI
  - Arrangement: Takao Konishi
  - Artist: Project DMM
- "Ultraman Max" (ウルトラマンマックス, Urutoraman Makkusu)
  - Lyrics: Neko Oikawa (及川 眠子, Oikawa Neko)
  - Composition & Arrangement: Yasuharu Takanashi (高梨 康治, Takanashi Yasuharu)
  - Artist: TEAM DASH with Project DMM
- "Ultra Roku Kyōdai" (ウルトラ六兄弟, Urutora Roku Kyōdai; "Six Ultra Brothers")
  - Lyrics: Yū Aku (阿久 悠, Aku Yū)
  - Composition: Makoto Kawaguchi (川口 真, Kawaguchi Makoto)
  - Arrangement: Kenji Yamamoto (山本 健司, Yamamoto Kenji)
  - Artist: Project DMM
- "Blue Spinning"
  - Lyrics: Daisuke Kanemitsu
  - Composition & Arrangement: Yuji Hamasaki
  - Artist: Shuri Miyumi
- "The Ultraman" (ザ☆ウルトラマン, Za Urutoraman)
  - Lyrics: Yū Aku
  - Composition & Arrangement: Kunio Miyauchi (宮内 國郎, Miyauchi Kunio)
  - Artist: Isao Sasaki (ささき いさお, Sasaki Isao), Columbia Yurikago Kai (コロムビアゆりかご会, Koromubia Yurikago Kai)
- "Buddy, steady, go!"
  - Composition & Arrangement: Cher Watanabe (渡部 チェル, Watanabe Cheru)
  - Lyrics & Artist: Takuma Terashima
- "Ultraman Mebius" (ウルトラマンメビウス, Urutoraman Mebiusu)
  - Lyrics: Gorō Matsui
  - Composition: Kisaburō Suzuki
  - Arrangement: Seiichi Kyoda (京田 誠一, Kyōda Seiichi)
  - Artist: Project DMM
- "Ultra Spiral"
  - Lyrics: TAKERU, Chiaki Seshimo
  - Composition & Arrangement: Takao Konishi
  - Artist: Voyager

=== The Destined Crossroad songs ===
Opening theme

- "Now or Never!"
  - Lyrics, Composition & Arrangement: Yocke
  - Artist: Konomi Suzuki (鈴木 このみ, Suzuki Konomi) from the Ultra League
  - The song is released in Japanese and English versions, each assigned to their respective dubs.

Ending theme

- "Super nova"
  - Lyrics: Daisuke Kanemitsu
  - Composition & Arrangement: Mine Kushita (久下 真音, Kushita Main)
  - Artist: Mion Yano (矢野 水音, Yano Mion)

Insert themes

- "Touch the Fire"
  - Lyrics: KATSUMI
  - Composition & Arrangement: Kazuya Daimon
  - Artist: Project DMM
- "ECLIPSE"
  - Lyrics & Composition : KATSUMI
  - Arrangement: Kazuya Daimon
  - Artist: Project DMM
- "Ultraman Nice" (ウルトラマンナイス, Urutoraman Naisu)
  - Lyrics: Rinozuka Reo (里乃塚 玲央, Rinozuka Reo)
  - Composition: Yasuo Kosugi (小杉 保夫, Kosugi Yasuo)
  - Arrangement: MANTA
  - Artist: Project DMM
- "Ultra Spiral"
  - Lyrics: TAKERU, Chiaki Seshimo
  - Composition & Arrangement: Takao Konishi
  - Artist: Voyager
- "Fusion Rise!" (フュージョンライズ!, Fyūjon Raizu!)
  - Lyrics: Daisuke Kanemitsu
  - Composition & Arrangement: Yuji Hamasaki
  - Artist: Voyager
- "Blue Spinning"
  - Lyrics: Daisuke Kanemitsu
  - Composition & Arrangement: Yuji Hamasaki
  - Artist: Shuri Miyumi
- "Buddy, steady, go!"
  - Composition & Arrangement: Cher Watanabe
  - Lyrics & Artist: Takuma Terashima
- "Orb no Inori"
  - Lyrics & Composition: Toshihiko Takamizawa
  - Arrangement: Toshihiko Takamizawa with Yuichiro Honda
  - Artist: Ichiro Mizuki with Voyager
- "Chō Yūsha Buddy Go!" (超勇者BUDDY GO!, Chō Yūsha Badi Gō!; "Super Hero Buddy Go!")
  - Lyrics: Erica Masaki (真崎 エリカ, Masaki Erika)
  - Composition: Yuki Honda (本多 友紀, Honda Yūki) (Arte Refact)
  - Arrangement: Masatomi Waki (脇 眞富, Waki Masatomi) (Arte Refact)
  - Artist: Ultraman Taiga (Takuma Terashima)
- "Toki no Naka o Hashirinukete" (時の中を走りぬけて; "Race Against Time")
  - Lyrics: Yū Aku
  - Composition: Shunichi Tokura (都倉 俊一, Tokura Shun'ichi)
  - Arrangement: Shinsuke Kazato (風戸 慎介, Kazato Shinsuke)
  - Artist: Shinichi Ishihara (石原 慎一, Ishihara Shin'ichi), Koorogi '73 (こおろぎ'73, Kōrogi Nanajū-san)
- "ZERO to INFINITY"
  - Composition: Erde, Daniel Durn, Katrine "Neya" Klith
  - Arrangement: Erde
  - Lyrics & Artist: Mamoru Miyano
- "Tatakae! Ultraman Leo" (戦え! ウルトラマンレオ, Tatakae! Urutoraman Reo; "Fight! Ultraman Leo")
  - Lyrics: Yū Aku
  - Composition & Arrangement: Makoto Kawaguchi
  - Artist: Yuki Hide (ヒデ 夕樹, Hide Yūki), Mizuumi Boys and Girls Choir (少年少女合唱団みずうみ, Shōnen Shōjo Gasshōdan Mizūmi)
- "Promise for the future"
  - Lyrics: Mike Sugiyama (マイク スギヤマ, Maiku Sugiyama)
  - Composition: Toru Watanabe (渡辺 徹, Watanabe Tōru)
  - Arrangement: ats-, Takehito Shimizu (清水 武仁, Shimizu Takehito) & Toru Watanabe (Blue Bird's Nest)
  - Artist: Tasuku Hatanaka
