= Ultraman Taro (character) =

- Ultra Series character
- Ultraman Taro as seen in episode 11 of Ultraman Ginga.
- First appearance: Ultraman Taro (1973)
- Created by: Tsuburaya Productions
- Designed by: Akihiko Iguchi
- Portrayed by: Hiroshi Nagasawa
- Voiced by: Japanese: Saburō Shinoda (1973-74); Masako Nozawa (1984, young); Hiroya Ishimaru (1984-2023); Ryo Horikawa (1996); Miyu Irino (2018; stage); English: William Winckler (William Winckler Productions); Bill Sullivan (2019; UGF)

In-universe information
- Species: Ultra
- Gender: Male
- Title(s): Ultraman No.6 (ウルトラマンNo.6, Urutoraman Nanbā Shikkusu) (Note: Said in the opening theme of Ultraman Taro.)
- Occupation: Lead instructor of the Inter-Galactic Defense Force
- Affiliation: Inter-Galactic Defense Force; Ultra Brothers
- Weapon: Taro Bracelet; King Bracelet
- Family: Father of Ultra (father); Mother of Ultra (mother); Ultraseven (cousin); Ultraman Jack (uncle); Ultraman Ace (adopted brother)
- Children: Ultraman Taiga (son)
- Origin: Nebula M78, the Land of Light

Ultraman Taro (ウルトラマンタロウ, Urutoraman Tarō) is the main protagonist of the 1973 Ultra Series, Ultraman Taro. In the series, Ultraman Taro merged with Kotaro Higashi the latter loses his life during Astromons' rampage. After that, Kotaro joined the battle as a ZAT member and utilized Taro's power to fight against giant monsters while receiving assistance from either his fellow brothers-in-arms (Ultra Brothers) or his parents. In the final episode, Kotaro severed his connection to Taro and returned the Ultra Badge, as he wanted to continue living his life as a normal human. He is last seen traveling around the world.

Ultraman Taro is the third entry in the Ultra Series' second phase during the Showa Era. Alongside Fireman and Jumborg Ace, the three celebrated the 10th anniversary of Tsuburaya Productions despite airing on different television channels. The presence of his parents (Father and Mother of Ultra) and the Ultra Brothers emphasizes the theme of family in the series as a whole. Despite Taro's current popularity, many long time fans in the Showa era did not acknowledge this work.

In the original series, Ultraman Taro is voiced by Saburō Shinoda, who is also Kotaro Higashi's actor. In subsequent media, Taro is frequently voiced by Hiroya Ishimaru (石丸 博也, Ishimaru Hiroya). Meanwhile, his original suit actor is Hiroshi Nagasawa (長沢 寛, Nagasawa Hiroshi).

== Character conception ==
According to the second DVD volume of Ultraman Taro, the series' production had been conceived since autumn 1972, when Ultraman Ace was airing. The television network Tokyo Broadcasting System originally planned on ending the Ultra Series with Ace.

=== Design ===
Ultraman Taro was designed by Akihiko Iguchi (井口 昭彦, Iguchi Akihiko). His figure is based on the body of Ultraseven, with the latter's Beam Lamp, red color, and large projections. The Ultra Horns are an inherited feature from the Father of Ultra. There were also plans to include ears on Taro's helmet as seen in the original design, but they were removed in the finalized version. The prototype of Taro's mask was molded by Terui Satake (照井 栄, Satake Terui) at the request of Kaigome Production (開米プロダクション, Kaigome Purodakushon). Satake asked the producer, Kumagai, for a 170 cm tall suit actor for Taro due to the Ultra's head design.

=== Naming ===
Taro's name comes from either a stand-alone masculine Japanese given name/common name suffix, or one of the most typical names of a boy in otogi-banashi/Japanese fairy tales, the latter coinciding with the fairy tale motif in the Ultraman Taro series. However, in-universe, it is said that this was given by the Father of Ultra, as it meant "someone who has courage and loves justice" (勇気を持ち正義を愛する者, Yūki o mochi seigi o aisuru mono), which is similarly translated in Earth's culture.

In original planning, Taro and his home series were meant to be named as Ultraman Jack (ウルトラマンジャック, Urutoraman Jakku), which was ultimately revised due to the aircraft hijacking incidents at the time. This name was given to the New Ultraman from Return of Ultraman.

== History ==
=== Past ===
Taro's past and his exploits prior to arriving on Earth is explained in his academic journal from the 2003 magazine. Some of these settings were not acknowledged in recent media.

At the time of his birth as a big healthy baby, his cry shocked his parents. As children in the Land of Light grow faster, Taro's growth rate is known to be remarkable. He could walk in two weeks and talk in one month. At one point, he nervously cried when his father played a prank. During childhood, Taro played with his cousin Seven, who was 3,000 years old. Taro was rough and a bit rebellious, but became kinder when his father brought a harmless monster from space. He loved to play and was popular with the children at the park. When he was 8, he demonstrated the ability to lift a rock weighing 12 tons.

Taro entered school when he was 3,000 years old. As his parents helped him in his study, he excelled in gymnastics, helped his classmates in their studies, and won an Olympic Games for children. He excelled in robotics and space monster science. After his graduation, Taro visited various planets to fight evil monsters and hone his fighting skills. At one point, he fought against the 2 million ton monster Deathgadon (デスガドン, Desugadon) in LP Nebula and escorted Diaking (ダイヤキング, Daiyakingu) from the Andromeda nebula to the Monster Graveyard. When he entered the Plasma fusion device, he fought against the monster Gironga (ギロンガ). Zoffy chose Taro as the sixth Ultra Brother after observing his exploits and was sent to Earth.

=== Ultraman Taro ===
In the original series, Taro was meant to be the Ultraman form of Kotaro Higashi, who was revived with the energy of Ultra Brothers by Ultra's Mother after his death from Astromons, which explained his absence in Ultraman Leo when the rest of the Ultra Brothers appear.

After his first battle, Taro faces monster and alien attacks with the help of ZAT members and the Ultra Brothers' occasional appearances. In one of his battles, Taro is gravely injured and dies from his fight against Birdon. Zoffy carries his body to the Land of Light to recuperate while he fights Birdron; he is ultimately defeated. Taro returns and uses his new weapon, the King Bracelet, to lure the monster back to Okumayama. He seals the volcano's entrance and destroys its eggs.

During Mururoa's assault on Earth, Taro calls for the Ultra Brothers' help to bring the Ultra Bell from their home world to clear the monster's smoke and return sunlight to Earth. He also confronted opponents that his predecessors fought before, such as Alien Mefilas II, Eleking II, Yapool, Bemstar, Verokron and Sabotendar. In a two-parter episode, Taro and the five brothers are hunted by Temperor on Earth, who intended to invade the Land of Light. By hiding in several toy capsules, they ambush the alien. The Temperor was defeated by Taro's Neo Strium Ray while his leader is eliminated by the combined attacks from the Ultra Brothers.

During Tyrant's assassination attempt on the Ultra Brothers, Taro and ZAT members are warned beforehand of its arrival. Taro fights the combined monster and wins the battle by using his opponent's own weapon against itself. In the final episode Taro fights with Samekujira and the invader Alien Valky. When the monster is defeated, Kotaro decides to remain as a human by returning the Ultra Badge back to Mother of Ultra and prove himself by killing Valky with his own wits.

=== Ultraman Story ===
While Zoffy, Ultraman, and Seven were fighting elsewhere, a young Taro trained himself in order to join the Ultra Brothers. After fighting a Dokkun, Mother of Ultra comes and has them reconcile while Father of Ultra lectures him of the existence of friendly monsters.

As Taro grew into a young adult, his overconfidence gets the best of him until he is lectured by his father. He matures by learning and watching the Ultra Brothers' battles. At one point, he is sent to deal with both Alien Mefilas and his Eleking on Earth after the two escaped from Ultraman and Seven. After receiving a precognitive dream of an incoming threat, Taro endured the final phase of his training: using his Ultra Horns to Father of Ultra's energies to fight against Juda, an old foe whom his father fought 50,000 years ago. With Father of Ultra injured in fighting Alien Hipporit, Taro deals with another of Juda's accomplice, Enmargo, on Earth while the rest of Ultra Brothers confront Grand King. Taro joins the Brothers on Planet Feralt and fuses with them to defeat Grand King. They return to the Land of Light as Father and Mother of Ultra await.

The movie is the first time Taro is voiced by Hiroya Ishimaru. His younger self is voiced by Masako Nozawa (野沢 雅子, Nozawa Masako).

=== Subsequent history in the Showa era ===
- The 6 Ultra Brothers vs. the Monster Army (1974 (Thailand)/1979 (Japan)):
- Ultraman Zoffy: Ultra Warriors vs. the Giant Monster Army (1984): Taro is voiced by Masahiro Sakuramoto (桜本 昌弘, Sakuramoto Masahiro).

=== Heisei era ===
- Ultraman Mebius & Ultraman Brothers (2006): Taro and Zoffy appear in the movie's climax to aid their fellow Ultra Brothers and Mebius recharge their energies. With the Ultra Brothers united, they combine with Mebius to form Mebius Infinity to defeat Yapool and freed Kobe. Taro and Zoffy are last seen accompanying Mirai Hibino's Gun Winger before departing Earth.
- Ultraman Mebius (2006): Taro is originally one of the few Ultras that witnessed Mebius gaining the Mebius Brace from the Father of Ultra. In episodes 29 and 30, Taro goes to Earth to replace Mebius when the Inpelaizer starts its attack on Earth. As Crew GUYS prepare a trap for the robot, Taro joins the battle when their plan fails and attempts to use his sealed technique Ultra Dynamite. Initially dismayed with Mebius' participation, Taro allows him to join the battle and the latter proves victorious with his new form, Burning Brave. Under Crew GUYS' persuasion, Taro allows Mebius to remain on Earth. In the final three episodes, Taro joins his brothers in cleansing the Solar System's sun from Alien Empera's sunspot.
- Ultraman Mebius Side Story: Ghost Reverse (2009): After being lured to the Monster Graveyard by Hikari's Ultra Sign, Taro and Ace fall into a trap orchestrated by the Dark Four Heavenly Kings, who are assisted by a traitorous Hikari. As Mebius is forced to bring the Giga Battlenizer as a leverage, Hikari drops the facade as he frees both captives and all four Ultras fight against the revived heralds of Alien Empera.
- Mega Monster Battle: Ultra Galaxy (2009): In the opening of the movie, Taro instructs a group of students who practiced their finishing beams. Following Ultraman Belial's escape, Taro leads a squadron of Ultras to hold the renegade Ultra in place; he fails and falls into the surface of the Land of Light. As Belial escapes with the Plasma Spark, Taro sacrifices himself to contain the last light while affirming his belief that his home world will return. This piece of light is given to Ultraman, Seven and Mebius to transform as they bring Rei along with them towards the Monster Graveyard and fight Belial's army of 100 monsters. As Ultraman Zero returns the Plasma Spark to its rightful place, Taro and his parents are unfrozen and go to hear Ultraman King's speech. In the English dub of the movie, Taro is voiced by William Winckler.
- Ultraman Zero: The Revenge of Belial (2010): Taro is among the Space Garrison members that studies the Darklop's remains and donates his light to Zero's travel sphere so that the youth can travel to an alternate universe. William Winckler reprises his voice role as Taro in the film's English dub.
- Ultraman Ginga (2013): Alongside the Ultra Brothers, Taro is among the combatants of Dark Spark War but is cursed into a Spark Doll by Dark Lugiel. Taro retains his sentience due to his fellow brothers-in-arms and parents shielding him, and feels guilty for being "selfish" at that time. Taro becomes a teacher to Hikaru during his time on Earth and encourages Tomoya when he listens to the latter's personal problems. Due to his diminutive size as a Spark Doll, he can only use Ultra Psychokinesis (ウルトラ念力, Urutora Nenriki), fly and mass teleport at the cost of draining his energy. When Ultraman Ginga falls at the hands of Dark Lugiel, Furuboshi Town residents use their Ginga Light Sparks to restore Taro to his original state long enough to fend off Lugiel to revive Ginga. After Lugiel's destruction, he regains his original form and bids farewell to Hikaru and his friends. Hiroya Ishimaru reprised his voice role as Taro and Ultra's younger self is voiced by Kenta Matsumoto (松本 健太, Matsumoto Kenta). In 2013, Taro was among the Ultramen who were present in an award ceremony when the Ultra Series was nominated as the series with most spin-offs and sequels, while the original Ultraman held the certificate given by Guinness World Records with Takuya Negishi, Hikaru Raido's actor in Ultraman Ginga.
  - Ultraman Ginga Theater Special (2013): In the middle of the Ultraman Ginga season break, Taro accompanies Hikaru and his friends to salvage monster Spark Dolls in the Furuboshi mountainside and gives additional detail about the monsters. Despite Taro's efforts to attack Alien Icarus with Ultra Psychokinesis, Alien Icarus claims all the Spark Dolls and merges into Tyrant, leading to a fight between Tiga and Jean-nine, and Ginga against Dark Zagi. At the end of the day, Taro remarks that their mission is not finished as he is still trapped in the Spark Doll state.
  - Ultraman Ginga Theater Special: Ultra Monster Hero Battle Royal! (2014): Ultraman Taro is among the sketches that Tomoya drew in his book until a strange cosmic energy wave occurred, materializing Ultraman Tiga and other sketches into Spark Dolls. Taro is used by Misuzu when she and her friends try to play using Ultra Warrior Spark Dolls until a software bug creates a group of five dark Ultramen for them to fight. Misuzu/Ultraman Taro fights against Chaosroid T and wins by firing his/her Strium Ray.
- Ultraman Ginga S (2014): As revealed in Shin Ultraman Retsuden, Taro is given the power of the other five Ultra Brothers and transforms into the Strium Brace (ストリウムブレス, Sutoriumu Buresu), an item that allows Hikaru to transform into Ultraman Ginga Strium and gain access to all six powers of the Ultra Brothers. Taro's arrives on Earth when he senses a new threat. In aftermath of the battle with Dark Lugiel, Taro leaves Hikaru as his mission had ended. In an earlier draft, Ultraman Taro was meant to be brainwashed in the second half of the series and turned into Ultraman Taro Dark (ウルトラマンタロウダーク, Urutoraman Tarō Dāku).
- Ultraman Ginga S The Movie: Taro is mentioned by Zero when he addresses Hikaru and Sho. The cover of the Blu Ray release of the movie has Taro acknowledge the ambiguity of Ultraman Max's home world, saying that he lives "somewhere in Nebula M78".
- Ultraman Orb (2016): Ultraman Taro is mentioned to be the sealer of Maga-Grand King in the Pacific Records before Jugglus releases the King Demon Beast. Upon its defeat, Gai acquires his Ultra Fusion Card, who uses it alongside Ultraman Mebius' card to transform into Ultraman Orb Burnmite. In the final episode of the series, Taro and the other Ultra Fusion Cards in Gai's possession transform into physical projections of their owner to assist Ultraman Orb in delivering the finishing blow to Magata no Orochi while Juggler holds off the monster long enough to expose its weak spot.
- Ultraman Geed (2017): In the cold opening of episode 1, Taro is among the members of the Space Garrison that fight against Belial's reign of terror on Earth. After the evil Ultra detonates the entire universe and King merges with it to undo the damage, Taro's power is contained in the Little Star of Tetsuro Matsumoto, giving the boy pyrokinesis, which is eventually harvested by Ultraman Geed, obtaining the Taro Capsule (タロウカプセル, Tarō Kapuseru), and allowing him to execute Strium Flasher when assuming the Royal Mega-Master form.
- Ultraman Geed the Movie (2018): From Jugglus Juggler's recollection, Taro and a squadron of Ultras were sent to deal with Gilbaris and fought in Cyber Planet Kushia but due to the absence of the red steel, the rogue AI managed to escape unharmed and teleported elsewhere along with the entire planet.
- Ultraman R/B (2018): Ultraman Taro's power dominates the R/B Crystal element of fire, which allows Ultramen Rosso or Blu to assume the fire-oriented form Flame. The crystal is sent to the Minato brothers alongside Ginga Crystal as they first transform to fight against Grigio Bone's assault on Ayaka City.

=== Reiwa era ===
- Ultra Galaxy Fight: New Generation Heroes (2019): At some point of time in the past, Taro fought Ultra Dark Killer, who was formed by the souls of monsters defeated by the Ultra Brothers. When Dark Killer returns and threatens Ultramen X, Geed, Zero and Ultrawoman Grigio, he is forced to recruit the New Generation Heroes and eventually grant Ginga the Strium Brace while instructing the others to donate their energy, allowing Ginga Strium to perform New Generation Dynamite and defeating the empowered Dark Killer once and for all.
- Ultraman Taiga (2019): Ultraman Taro is revealed to have a son named Taiga, including the fact that he was estranged with his former friend, Ultraman Tregear. Directly after the end of Galaxy Fight, Taro joins the New Generation Ultras to prevent Tregear from returning to the Land of Light. With all junior Ultras incapacitated, Taro's fate remains unknown after his fight with Tregear. In the present day, his Taro-let (タロウレット, Tarō-retto) transforms into Hiroyuki's Taiga Spark, allowing the youth to transform into any of the Tri-Squad members.
- Ultraman Taiga The Movie (2020): After Grimdo was released from Tregear, Taro attempted to join forces with his son on Earth, but was possessed by the evil monster during an attempt to use his Ultra Dynamite. The brainwashed Taro joined Tregear in opposing the New Generation Heroes on Earth and was freed through Hiroyuki and the Tri-Squad's power of bonds.
- Ultra Galaxy Fight: The Absolute Cospiracy (2020): The young Ultraman Taro is voiced by Showtaro Morikubo (森久保 祥太郎, Morikubo Shōtarō).
- Ultraman Z (2020): His power inhabits the Ultraman Taro Medal (ウルトラマンタロウメダル, Urutoraman Tarō Medaru), one of the many Ultra Medals manufactured in the Land of Light. When Genegarg steals them and is destroyed by Ultraman Z's Zestium Beam, the Medal is among those scattered from the explosion and salvaged by the Ultra's human host, Haruki.

== Profile ==
Ultraman Taro's statistics below were never mentioned in the original series, but were brought up in magazines and official websites. There are also certain succeeding series that deviate from Ultraman's original statistics:

- Height: 53 m
- Weight: 55,000 t
- Flight Speed: Mach 20
- Age: 12,000 years old
- Birthplace: Nebula M78, Land of Light
- Year Debut: 1973
- First Appearance: Ultraman Taro (1973)
- Family structure:
  - Father: Father of Ultra (Ultraman Ken)
  - Mother: Mother of Ultra (Ultrawoman Marie)
  - Cousin: Ultraseven (Note: Said to be related due to Seven's late mother is one of the Mother of Ultra's sibling. However, some sources stated that this relationship is no longer relevant in today.)
  - Uncle: Ultraman Jack (Note: Shared with Ultraseven, as Jack is married to one of Mother of Ultra's siblings.)
  - Adopted brother: Ultraman Ace
  - Son: Ultraman Taiga

=== Description ===
As the official website of Tsuburaya Productions stated: "The mature biological son of Mother and Father of Ultra comes from Nebula M78 of the Land of Light to Earth. On Earth, he assumes the form of Kotaro Higashi, a member of the defense team ZAT. Taro is a member of the Ultra Brothers, lead instructor of the Space Garrison and even a mentor to Ultraman Mebius. His finishing move is Strium Ray, among others."

=== Transformation ===
Kotaro transforms by using the Ultra Badge (ウルトラバッジ, Urutora Bajji), which was stored on the left shoulder of his ZAT uniform when not in use. Kotaro pulls the Badge and spreads his arms before drawing the item in the same position as his face and lifts it towards the sky, shouting "Taro!". This is followed by Taro emerging from a black background as he rises towards the screen with silver rings accompanying him.

=== Features and weapons ===
- Beam Lamp (ビームランプ, Bīmu Ranpu): A feature that is shared with Ultraseven, which is a green lamp on his forehead. As Taro already has a Color Timer, the Beam Lamp does not notify him of the activity limit.
- Ultra Horn (ウルトラホーン, Urutora Hōn): An inherited feature from the Father of Ultra. It is also used in Taro's techniques, such as Arrow Ray (アロー光線, Arō Kōsen), and Blue Laser (ブルーレーザー, Burū Rēzā).
- Taro Bracelet (タロウブレスレット, Tarō Buresuretto): Taro's normal weapon, worn on his left arm and used to transform into Bracelet Lancer (ブレスレットランサー, Buresuretto Ransā) and fires Set Ray (セット光線, Setto Kōsen).
- King Bracelet (キングブレスレット, Kingu Buresuretto): A new weapon given by the Mother of Ultra in Episode 19. The Ultra Power Diamond (ウルトラ・パワーダイヤ, Urutora Pawā Daiya) absorbs sunlight energy whereas the Ultra Valve Star (ウルトラ・バルブスター, Urutora Barubu Sutā) gives multiple abilities to the bracelet. It was originally meant to be used for Zoffy. The King Bracelet also possesses multiple abilities, including the ability to summon a bucket of water and even a reach extender.

=== Powers and abilities ===
Ultraman Taro is said to be the strongest Ultra Brothers at the time of his debut on Earth, evidenced by the fact that his Color Timer usually only blinks at the end of the battles and he is capable of surviving even after being stabbed by Depparas' tusk in the gut. He is also known as the hero with 11 skills. In contrast to his brothers, he shouts most of his attacks' names. Taro's main finisher is Strium Ray (ストリウム光線, Sutoriumu Kōsen), which is done by charging his body with energy as his hands raised above and lowered to his waist as they took the "T" formation and fired an energy beam. This firing ray is said to have twice the power as Ultraman Ace's Metallium Ray and even outclassed those of Ultra Brothers. A stronger version also existed, named Neo Strium Ray (ネオストリウム光線, Neo Sutoriumu Kōsen) by placing his hands in an "X" position. (Note: Some sources claimed it as Strium Ray Type B (ストリウム光線B型, Sutoriumu Kōsen Bī-gata).) Back in his childhood, the young Taro prefers using a finisher named as Taro Shot (タロウショット, Tarō Shotto).

His strongest attack is the suicidal Ultra Dynamite (ウルトラダイナマイト, Urutora Dainamaito), as he charges his body with fire and runs towards the opponent. It is once used against Alien Katan as his body reconstituted due to his Ultra Heart (ウルトラ心臓, Urutora Shinzō) As a result of its dangerous nature, Taro sealed it until he is forced to use it again in Ultraman Mebius during a failed attempt to destroy Inpelaizer. In this scene, the explosion effect was added to appear as if parts of Taro's body were scattered as a result.

In Ultraman Story, Taro merged with the rest of his five brothers with Ultra 6 Polymer (ウルトラ6重合体, Urutora Roku Jūgō-tai), and became a Super Ultraman (スーパーウルトラマン, Sūpā Urutoraman).

== Human hosts ==
=== Kotaro Higashi ===
Kotaro Higashi
- Ultra Series character
- Kotaro Higashi, as portrayed by Saburō Shinoda, as he appeared in Ultraman Taro.
- First appearance: Ultraman Taro (1973)
- Created by: Tsuburaya Productions
- Portrayed by: Saburō Shinoda

Kotaro Higashi (東 光太郎, Higashi Kōtarō) is the protagonist of Ultraman Taro and Taro's initial human host. Due to the original setting of the series of the time, Kotaro's case was an inversion of the original trope as he was supposed to become an Ultraman instead of fusing with them.

Kotaro is originally a traveler who returned to Japan by hitching a ride in the Hibimaru (日日丸) tanker ship. After saving the ship's crew from Oil Drinker, Kotaro plants the seed which grows into Tigris Flower which becomes the space monster Astromons. To fix his mistake, he tries to fight Astromons on his own, only to fall several feet from the sky. After his injuries heal the following next day, Kotaro joins the ranks of ZAT but loses his life when his aircraft is shot down. His body is brought to the Land of Light and bestowed with the spirit of Ultra to become Ultraman Taro, taking down Astromons moments after the fight. Under orders from his captain, Kotaro lives at the Shiratori residence, whose patriarch–Kiyoshi Shiratori–is the captain of Hibimaru.

As an aspiring boxer, at one point Kotaro goes on a strict diet which affects his job. He also befriends several children he meets after the Astromons incident. In the final episode, Kiyoshi Shiratori loses his life by Samekujira, a space monster commanded by the invader Alien Valky. Ultraman Taro manages to defeat the monster and Kotaro severs his bonds to preserve his humanity, throwing the Ultra Badge to the sky. Alien Valky tries to assassinate Kotaro but he manages to kill it by luring the alien to an oil refinery. In the end, Kotaro bids farewell to ZAT and his friends as he travels abroad.

Kotaro Higashi is portrayed by Saburō Shinoda (篠田 三郎, Shinoda Saburō). After auditioning for the role, he was first given a guest role Ichirō Shinoda (篠田 一郎, Shinoda Ichirō) in episode 20 of Ultraman Ace by producer Yōji Hashimoto (橋本 洋二, Hashimoto Yōji), who after seeing Saburo's suitability as a main character, decided to get a first impression on the actor at the filming site.

=== Other hosts ===
In certain circumstances, Taro bonded with other people as substitute human hosts.

- In episode 34, Taro and Kotaro bond with a volleyball player in an attempt to hide from Alien Emperor's attack.
- During the events of Ultraman Ginga Theater Special: Ultra Monster Hero Battle Royal!, Taro's Spark Doll is among the copies created when Tomoya Ichijōji)'s sketchbook of Ultra Monsters is affected by cosmic waves. Misuzu Isurugi (石動 美鈴, Isurugi Misuzu) uses the Spark Doll when playing with her comrades and participates in a fight against a group of five evil Ultramen. Chaosroid T. Ultraman Taro and the other fake Spark Dolls revert into Tomoya's sketches once the effects of cosmic ray radiation expire.

== Cultural impact ==
- The protagonist of Ultimate Muscle, Mantaro Kinniku, is revealed to have his name revolved around Ultraman Taro, which is acknowledged in-universe in the first volume of the manga. Due to this, his name is often called in the anime adaptation as Kinnikuman Taro (キン肉マン・タロウ, Kinnikuman Tarō). Mantaro is aware of this and even disparages his own name as lame.

== In other media ==
=== Anime and manga ===
- Ultraman Taro made his guest appearance in the third season of Imagin Anime, complete with Hiroya Ishimaru reprising his role.
- Ultraman Taro is one of the characters in a popular manga series, Ultraman Chotoshi Gekiden. In the 1996 OVA, he is voiced by Ryō Horikawa (堀川 りょう, Horikawa Ryō).
- In the 2011 manga re-imagination sequel of the original 1966 Ultraman of the same name, Kotaro Higashi is written as a Japanese photographer working in New York City who loses his friend Dave to an alien terrorist attack. After being administered with a specialized medicine, Kotaro is bestowed with a strange power that allows him to manipulate flames and become a vigilante hero. After the fight against Dark Star, Kotaro is given his own Ultraman Suit by Yapool to further strengthen his alter-ego disguise and as a limiter to keep his flame powers in check. His costumes, both hand-made and Ultraman Suit, are directly based on the eponymous Ultraman Taro.

=== Smartphone app ===
- Ultraman Taro is part of the LINE application stamps alongside other characters of Ultra Series, commercialized in 2013 and 2015.

=== Stage shows ===
- Ultraman Festival Live Stage:
  - 2016: Ultraman Taro appeared in the stage show as the Strium Brace, which allowed Ultraman Ginga to assume Ultraman Ginga Strium and defeated Dark Lugiel.
  - 2018: As a result of the fan-submitted contest, Taro demonstrated two stage-show exclusive attacks; Cosmo Miracle Slash (コスモミラクルスラッシュ, Kosumo Mirakuru Surasshu) with Ultraman and Integrate Spark (インテグレートスパーク, Integurēto Supāku) with Ultraman Geed. In this particular stage show, he is voiced by Miyu Irino (入野 自由, Irino Miyu), who also had a voice appearance as Jean-nine.

=== Variety show ===
- In 2017, Ultraman Taro made a guest appearance in the variety show Explore The Deep World Of Japanese Names! (人名探究バラエティー 日本人のおなまえっ！, Jinmei Tankyū Baraetī Nihonjin no onamae~!).

=== Video games ===
- Ultraman Taro appears in the 16th stage of City Shrouded in Shadow. He teams up with Ultraman to fight against Belial and is joined by Ultraman Zero later on.

== Reception ==
During the audition for Kotaro Higashi, Shinoda recalled that the role was also auditioned for by a fellow actor named Ken Matsudaira. While visiting the set of Ultraman Ace, he was impressed with Keiji Takamine's character (Seiji Hokuto) wearing a scarf and decided to do the same during his filming as well. Shinoda usually commutes to the filming studio by train and one time he woke up and found himself surrounded by children who were fans of Taro. One of the few people he met during the filming was Takashi Tsumura (working under the name Hidesuke Tsumura at that moment), the actor of Tetsuya Kitajima in same series, whose father, Hideo Tsumura was a famous movie critic. While reading the script for his character, Shinoda portrayed Kotaro as a child when facing against monster attacks believing that the childhood nature is suitable for Taro. When asked which monster is his favorite, he responded with Depparas from episode 10 of Taro. He believes that Kotaro's decision to remain as a human being is a mistake. In Tsuburaya's charity funding organization Ultraman Foundation, Shinoda was among the actors that gave their encouragement messages.

Shinoda maintained a good relationship with the late Peggy Hayama, who voiced the Mother of Ultra and her human form, Lady in Green. Befitting her role in the show, he even viewed her as a motherly figure and was surprised to see her working even in her old age. Following her death in 2017, Shinoda mentioned that they have been met each other 40 times since the end of the show. They even met each other at a restaurant, went to Tokyo Station and went home together in a bullet train.

Today, several actors of recent Ultra Series were known to be fans of Ultraman Taro, including Mamoru Miyano (Ultraman Zero) and Hideo Ishiguro (Ultraman Orb). Taiyo Sugiura, the actor of Musashi Haruno in Ultraman Cosmos mentioned that as a kindergarten student, he wrote his wish on a tanzaku that he "wanted to be Ultraman Taro". Additionally, Taiyo Sugiura and Saburō Shinoda starred in a late night drama named The Last Dinner (最後の晩ごはん, Saigo no Ban Gohan), where co-star Yūichi Nakamura expressed his delight to act alongside major Ultra Series actors. Yuya Hirata (Katsumi Minato/Ultraman Rosso) of Ultraman R/B said that "Once I got the role of Ultraman, I looked back at the book and remembered how special Ultraman Taro was for me and realized that Ultraman was one of my starting points."

=== Popularity ===
In 2006, a character popularity poll was launched in response to the 40th anniversary of Ultra Series. Based on Oricon's list, Ultraman Taro ranked the third place in all three categories: total, men and women alike. Five years later in the Ultra Series' 45th anniversary, Ultraman placed ninth in the popularity poll and ranked tenth in 2013. As a supporting character in Ultraman Ginga, Taro is one of the few Ultras to join the title hero and Hikaru's actor, Takuya Negishi, in an award ceremony when the Ultra Series was nominated by Guinness World Records as the series with most spin-offs and sequels.

In 2010, Taro and his parents are one of the main topics of "Parent and Child Interview" from the December 23, 2010, print of Mainichi Shimbun newspaper. The article is related to the annual Oyako Day in Japan, including its founder Bruce Osborn.
