= Ultraman R/B =

2018 Japanese TV series

- Title card
- Genre: Superhero; Tokusatsu; Kaiju; Science fiction Comedy; Drama; Kyodai Hero
- Written by: Takao Nakano; Junki Takegami; Satoshi Ito; Sachio Yanai; Hirotaka Adachi; Toshizo Nemoto; Yūji Kobayashi; Hirotoshi Kobayashi; Kyoko Katsuya; Junichiro Ashiki; Misaki Morie; Aya Satsuki
- Directed by: Masayoshi Takesue; Kiyotaka Taguchi; Ryuichi Ichino; Takanori Tsujimoto; Ryoichi Ito; Makoto Kamiya
- Starring: Yuya Hirata; Ryosuke Koike; Arisa Sonohara; Ayane Kinoshita; Motoki Fukami; Kaori Manabe; Ginnojo Yamazaki
- Opening theme: "Hands" by Masayoshi Ōishi
- Ending theme: "Yume Hikō" by Suzuko Mimori
- Composer: Yasuharu Takanashi
- Country of origin: Japan
- Original language: Japanese
- No. of episodes: 25

Production
- Running time: 30 min. (per episode)
- Production companies: Tsuburaya Productions; TV Tokyo; Dentsu

Original release
- Network: TXN (TV Tokyo)
- Release: July 7 – December 22, 2018

Related
- Ultraman Geed; Ultraman Taiga

Ultraman R/B (ウルトラマン R/B, Urutoraman Rūbu) (Note: "R/B" is pronounced "Ruebe".) is a Japanese tokusatsu superhero television series produced by Tsuburaya Productions. It is the 23rd entry (32nd overall) in the Ultra Series overall, the seventh entry in the "New Generation Heroes" lineup and the last entry in the series released in the Heisei era. It aired on TV Tokyo on July 7, 2018.

The series's main catchphrases are "This is the story of us, brothers. Starting out as Ultraman." (これは俺たち兄弟の物語。ウルトラマン、はじめます。, Kore wa oretachi kyōdai no monogatari. Urutoraman, hajimemasu.) and "Color me with your power! R/B!!" (オレ色に染めあげろ！ルーブ!!, Ore-iro ni someagero! Rūbu!!).

== Synopsis ==
The series takes place in Ayaka City, a jōkamachi-themed city that is funded by the mega corporation Aizentech. During the 15 year-anniversary of their mother's disappearance, Minato siblings Katsumi and Isami were rescued by the R/B Gyros from Grigio Bone's attack, transforming them into Ultramen Rosso and Blu. True to the show's theme of “bonds” and “love”, the brothers face their emotions with allies and against enemies, realizing important things they tend to take for granted. Although both siblings collide against each other, they willingly cooperate when fighting against opponents.

In the middle of the series, the perpetrator behind the monster attack was revealed to be Chereza, an alien who inhabited the body of Makoto Aizen to obtain the means to become an Ultraman, thus transforming into Ultraman Orb Dark. Unfortunately this doesn't last long as Saki Mitsurugi orchestrated his downfall and deposed Makoto to become the new president of Aizentech. With the Minato brothers obtaining the means to fuse into Ultraman Ruebe, Saki reveals herself as the youngest sister of a trio of siblings who died protecting the Earth, and her objective is to defeat Leugocyte in hopes of avenging her fallen brothers, former namesake users of Rosso and Blu.

In the middle of Saki's conflict with Minato brothers, Mio Minato returns from her disappearance and helped turn Leugocyte into a R/B Crystal and at the same time tried to stop the Minato brothers from becoming Ultramen in order to prevent their incoming deaths. Unfortunately Saki's determination to destroy the monster with the planet as a giant bomb foil Mio's plans and thus releasing Leugocyte in its corporeal state. With Earth nearing its explosion, Mio plans to banish Leugocyte and herself into an alternate dimension until the Minato siblings interfere, with Saki sacrificing her life to defend them. Having learned her extraterrestrial origin, Asahi becomes the Makoto Crystal and sacrificed herself to destroy Leugocyte by empowering Ultraman Ruebe. In aftermath of the battle, Asahi was revived as the Minato family went back to their normal lives.

== Production ==
As mentioned by Tsuburaya Productions, this series is part of the "New Generation Hero" (ニュージェネレーションヒーロー, Nyū Jenerēshon Hīrō) batch, which aired on TV Tokyo since the start of Ultraman Ginga. The new series is said to be filled with even more exciting elements than the past Ultra Series, with an unexpected story plot. Aside from the titular brothers fighting against their opponents, it also serves as a TV drama series focusing on the brothers’ family bond. In an interview conducted by Sports Hochi, filming of the series was revealed to have started on March 10, 2018. Takao Nakao returns from Ultraman Orb to serve as head of writing and series composition.

== Episodes ==
No.	Title	Written by	Original release date
1	"From Today We Are Ultraman"; Transliteration: "Urutoraman Hajimemashita" (Japanese: ウルトラマンはじめました)	Takao Nakano	July 7, 2018
2	"The Bond of Brothers"; Transliteration: "Kyōdai no Kizuna" (Japanese: 兄弟の絆)	Junki Takegami	July 14, 2018
3	"Welcome to Aizentech"; Transliteration: "Aizentekku e Yōkoso" (Japanese: アイゼンテックへようこそ)	Satoshi Ito	July 21, 2018
4	"The Winning Ball of Light"; Transliteration: "Hikari no Uiningu Bōru" (Japanese: 光のウイニングボール)	Sachio Yanai	July 28, 2018
5	"Goodbye, Icarus"; Transliteration: "Sayonara Ikarosu" (Japanese: さよならイカロス)	Hirotaka Adachi	August 4, 2018
6	"An Old Enemy! The Big Sister's Finisher Fist"; Transliteration: "Shukuteki! Anego Hissatsu-ken" (Japanese: 宿敵！あねご必殺拳)	Toshizo Nemoto	August 11, 2018
7	"Hero Disqualification"; Transliteration: "Hīrō Shikkaku" (Japanese: ヒーロー失格)	Yūji Kobayashi	August 18, 2018
8	"The World Is Waiting for Me"; Transliteration: "Sekai-jū ga Ore o Matteiru" (Japanese: 世界中がオレを待っている)	Takao Nakano	August 25, 2018
9	"In the Name of Ultraman"; Transliteration: "Urutoraman no Na no Moto ni" (Japanese: ウルトラマンの名のもとに)	Hirotoshi Kobayashi	September 1, 2018
10	"The Minato Family's Day Off"; Transliteration: "Minato-ke no Kyūjitsu" (Japanese: 湊家の休日)	Kyoko Katsuya	September 8, 2018
11	"Aizen Frenzy"; Transliteration: "Aizen Kyōsōkyoku" (Japanese: アイゼン狂騒曲)	Satoshi Ito	September 15, 2018
12	"What We Should Protect"; Transliteration: "Oretachi ga Mamoru beki Mono" (Japanese: 俺たちの守るべきもの)	Junki Takegami	September 22, 2018
13	"I Don't Want Secrets!"; Transliteration: "Himitsu wa Iya desu!" (Japanese: 秘密はイヤです！)	Junichiro Ashiki	September 29, 2018
14	"Who Are You?"; Transliteration: "Omae wa Dare da" (Japanese: お前は誰だ)	Misaki Morie	October 6, 2018
15	"Enshrined by Kiwami"; Transliteration: "Matō wa Kiwami" (Japanese: まとうは極)	Takao Nakano	October 13, 2018
16	"This Moment Is a Bond"; Transliteration: "Kono Shunkan ga Kizuna" (Japanese: この瞬間が絆)	Sachio Yanai	October 20, 2018
17	"Everyone Is Friends"; Transliteration: "Min'na ga Tomodachi" (Japanese: みんなが友だち)	Aya Satsuki	October 27, 2018
18	"A World Without Tomorrow"; Transliteration: "Asu Naki Sekai" (Japanese: 明日なき世界)	Kyoko Katsuya	November 3, 2018
19	"The Good and the Bad"; Transliteration: "Zen'nin to Aku'nin" (Japanese: 善人と悪人)	Junki Takegami	November 10, 2018
20	"Memory of Stardust"; Transliteration: "Hoshikuzu no Kioku" (Japanese: 星屑の記憶)	Yūji Kobayashi	November 17, 2018
21	"Candies and Manjū"; Transliteration: "Amedama to Omanjū" (Japanese: あめ玉とおまんじゅう)	Toshizō Nemoto	November 24, 2018
22	"The Extradimensional Mother"; Transliteration: "Ijigen Kāsan" (Japanese: 異次元かあさん)	Misaki Morie	December 1, 2018
23	"The Crystal of Destruction"; Transliteration: "Horobi no Kurisutaru" (Japanese: 滅びのクリスタル)	Satoshi Ito	December 8, 2018
24	"I Am Happy"; Transliteration: "Watashi wa Happī" (Japanese: 私はハッピー)	Junki Takegami	December 15, 2018
25	"Sunrise Hits Home"; Transliteration: "Asahi no Ataru Ie" (Japanese: 朝日のあたる家)	Takao Nakano	December 22, 2018

== Ultraman R/B The Movie ==
Ultraman R/B The Movie (劇場版 ウルトラマン R/B セレクト! 絆のクリスタル, Gekijō-ban Urutoraman Rūbu Serekuto! Kizuna no Kurisutaru; also called "Ultraman R/B The Movie: Select! The Crystal of Bond") was released on March 8, 2019.

== Related media ==
=== Appearances in other Ultra Series media ===
- In the final episode of Ultraman Orb: The Chronicle, Katsumi and Isami made their appearance as they walk past Gai Kurenai during the evening.
- Ultra Galaxy Fight: New Generation Heroes/Ultraman Taiga (2019)/Ultraman Taiga The Movie (2020): See here
- Ultra Galaxy Fight: The Absolute Conspiracy (2020): Ultrawoman Grigio return to help Tri-Squad and Ultraman Z to stop the conspiracy led by Absolute Tartarus along with other Ultras without her brothers help.

== Cast ==
- Katsumi Minato (湊 カツミ, Minato Katsumi), Rosso (ロッソ, Rosso; 24): Yuya Hirata (平田 雄也, Hirata Yūya)
- Isami Minato (湊 イサミ, Minato Isami), Blu (ブル, Buru; 24): Ryosuke Koike (小池 亮介, Koike Ryōsuke)
- Asahi Minato (湊 アサヒ, Minato Asahi): Arisa Sonohara (其原 有沙, Sonohara Arisa)
- Makoto Aizen (愛染 マコト, Aizen Makoto): Motoki Fukami (深水 元基, Fukami Motoki)
- Saki Mitsurugi (美剣 サキ, Mitsurugi Saki): Ayane Kinoshita (木下 彩音, Kinoshita Ayane)
- Mio Minato (湊 ミオ, Minato Mio): Kaori Manabe (眞鍋 かをり, Manabe Kaori)
- Ushio Minato (湊 ウシオ, Minato Ushio): Ginnojo Yamazaki (山崎 銀之丞, Yamazaki Gin'nojō)

=== Voice cast ===
- D.R.L.N. (ダーリン, Dārin): Kaede Yuasa (湯浅 かえで, Yuasa Kaede)
- R/B Gyro (ルーブジャイロ, Rūbu Jairo), Orb Ring NEO (オーブリングNEO, Ōbu Ringu Neo): Holly Kaneko (金子 はりい, Kaneko Harii)

=== Guest cast ===
- Matsuo Kumashiro (熊城 松雄, Kumashiro Matsuo; 4): Sei Hiraizumi (平泉 成, Hiraizumi Sei)
- Booska (ブースカ, Būsuka; Voice; 17): Miina Tominaga (冨永 みーな, Tominaga Mīna)

== Songs ==
Opening theme

- "Hands"
  - Lyrics: Kentaro Sonoda (園田 健太郎, Sonoda Kentarō)
  - Composition & Arrangement: Kentaro Sonoda, Tsubasa Ito (伊藤 翼, Itō Tsubasa)
  - Artist: Masayoshi Ōishi (オーイシ マサヨシ, Ōishi Masayoshi)
  - Episodes: 1–15 (Verse 1), 16, 18–24 (Verse 2)
  A re-arranged version of this song is used in Episode 17.

Ending theme

- "Yume Hikō" (夢飛行; lit. "Dream Flight")
  - Lyrics: Shihori (しほり)
  - Composition: Hajime Mitsumasu (光増 ハジメ, Mitsumasu Hajime)
  - Arrangement: EFFY
  - Artist: Suzuko Mimori (三森 すずこ, Mimori Suzuko)
  - Episodes: 1–15 (Verse 1), 16–25 (Verse 2)

== See also ==
- Ultra Series - Complete list of official Ultraman-related shows.
