= Ultraman Taiga The Movie =

2020 Japanese superhero kaiju film

Japanese name
- Kanji: 劇場版 ウルトラマンタイガ ニュージェネクライマックス
Transcriptions
- Revised Hepburn: Gekijō-ban Urutoraman Taiga Nyū Jene Kuraimakkusu
- Directed by: Ryuichi Ichino
- Written by: Sotaro Hayashi; Takao Nakano
- Based on: Ultraman Taiga by Ryuichi Ichino
- Starring: Yuki Inoue; Ryotaro; Ayuri Yoshinaga; Kou Nanase; Chiharu Niiyama; Yuya Hirata; Ryosuke Koike; Tatsuomi Hamada; Hideo Ishiguro; Kensuke Takahashi; Kiyotaka Uji; Takuya Negishi
- Music by: Yuya Mori
- Production company: Tsuburaya Productions
- Distributed by: Shochiku
- Release date: August 7, 2020
- Running time: 72 mins
- Country: Japan
- Language: Japanese

Ultraman Taiga The Movie (劇場版 ウルトラマンタイガ ニュージェネクライマックス, Gekijō-ban Urutoraman Taiga Nyū Jene Kuraimakkusu; also called "Ultraman Taiga The Movie: New Generation Climax") is a 2020 Japanese superhero kaiju film, serving as the sequel and film adaptation of the 2019 Ultra Series television series Ultraman Taiga. The film originally scheduled to release in Japanese theaters on March 6, 2020 but was withdrawn at the height of COVID-19 pandemic. A month after Japan lifted the state of emergency, the film was given a new release date of August 7, 2020.

== Premise ==
E.G.I.S. member Hiroyuki Kudo has the ability to transform into any three members of the Tri-Squad, Ultramen Taiga, Titas and Fuma as their bond deepened within each battle they experiences. However, Hiroyuki has become the target of an unidentified opponent, forcing other members of the New Generation Heroes to appear one after another and together challenge the power of a great darkness. In addition, Taiga's father, Ultraman Taro, has come to Earth but attacked his own son under mysterious circumstances.

== Cast ==
- Hiroyuki Kudo (工藤 ヒロユキ, Kudō Hiroyuki): Yuki Inoue (井上 祐貴, Inoue Yūki)
- Homare Soya (宗谷 ホマレ, Sōya Homare): Ryotaro (諒太郎, Ryōtarō)
- Pirika Asahikawa (旭川 ピリカ, Asahikawa Pirika): Ayuri Yoshinaga (吉永 アユリ, Yoshinaga Ayuri)
- Kirisaki (霧崎): Kou Nanase (七瀬 公, Nanase Kō)
- Kana Sasaki (佐々木 カナ, Sasaki Kana): Chiharu Niiyama (新山 千春, Niiyama Chiharu)
- Katsumi Minato (湊 カツミ, Minato Katsumi)/Ultraman Rosso (ウルトラマンロッソ, Urutoraman Rosso; Voice): Yuya Hirata (平田 雄也, Hirata Yūya)
- Isami Minato (湊 イサミ, Minato Isami)/Ultraman Blu (ウルトラマンブル, Urutoraman Buru; Voice): Ryosuke Koike (小池 亮介, Koike Ryōsuke)
- Riku Asakura (朝倉 リク, Asakura Riku)/Ultraman Geed (ウルトラマンジード, Urutoraman Jīdo; Voice): Tatsuomi Hamada (濱田 龍臣, Hamada Tatsuomi)
- Gai Kurenai (クレナイ・ガイ, Kurenai Gai)/Ultraman Orb (ウルトラマンオーブ, Urutoraman Ōbu; Voice): Hideo Ishiguro (石黒 英雄, Ishiguro Hideo)
- Daichi Ozora (大空 大地, Ōzora Daichi): Kensuke Takahashi (高橋 健介, Takahashi Kensuke)
- Sho (ショウ, Shō)/Ultraman Victory (ウルトラマンビクトリー, Urutoraman Bikutorī; Voice): Kiyotaka Uji (宇治 清高, Uji Kiyotaka)
- Hikaru Raido (礼堂 ヒカル, Raidō Hikaru)/Ultraman Ginga (ウルトラマンギンガ, Urutoraman Ginga; Voice): Takuya Negishi (根岸 拓哉, Negishi Takuya)

=== Voice actors ===
- Ultraman Taiga (ウルトラマンタイガ, Urutoraman Taiga): Takuma Terashima (寺島 拓篤, Terashima Takuma)
- Ultraman Titas (ウルトラマンタイタス, Urutoraman Taitasu): Satoshi Hino (日野 聡, Hino Satoshi)
- Ultraman Fuma (ウルトラマンフーマ, Urutoraman Fūma): Shōta Hayama (葉山 翔太, Hayama Shōta)
- Ultraman Tregear (ウルトラマントレギア, Urutoraman Toregia):Yuma Uchida (内田 雄馬, Uchida Yūma)
- Ultrawoman Grigio (ウルトラウーマングリージョ, Urutoraūman Gurījo): Arisa Sonohara (其原 有沙, Sonohara Arisa)
- Alien Magma (マグマ星人, Maguma Seijin): Takaya Kuroda (黒田 崇矢, Kuroda Takaya)
- Alien Merkind (マーキンド星人, Mākindo Seijin): Takehisa Hirose (廣瀬 武央, Hirose Takehisa)
- Alien Fanton (ファントン星人, Fanton Seijin): Makoto Takahashi (高橋 麻琴, Takahashi Makoto)
- Dada (ダダ): Toshiyuki Morikawa (森川 智之, Morikawa Toshiyuki)
- Ultraman Taro (ウルトラマンタロウ, Urutoraman Tarō): Hiroya Ishimaru (石丸 博也, Ishimaru Hiroya)

== Theme song ==
- "Dramatic" (ドラマティック, Doramatikku)
  - Lyrics, Composition, & Arrangement: Takuya Watanabe (渡辺 拓也, Watanabe Takuya)
  - Artist: Daisuke Ono (小野 大輔, Ono Daisuke)

== Production ==
The film was announced on December 15, 2019 at Tokyo Dome City during Tsuburaya Productions' Tsubucon.
