= Ultraman R/B The Movie =

Japanese name
- Kanji: 劇場版 ウルトラマンR/B(ルーブ) セレクト! 絆のクリスタル
Transcriptions
- Revised Hepburn: Gekijō-ban Urutoraman Rūbu Serekuto! Kizuna no Kurisutaru
- Directed by: Masayoshi Takesue
- Written by: Takao Nakano
- Based on: Ultraman R/B by Masayoshi Takesue
- Starring: Yuya Hirata; Ryosuke Koike; Arisa Sonohara; Kaori Manabe; Ginnojo Yamazaki; Yukito Nishii; Ayane Kinoshita; Hideko Hara; Tatsuomi Hamada
- Music by: Yasuharu Takanashi
- Production company: Tsuburaya Productions
- Distributed by: Shochiku
- Release date: March 8, 2019
- Running time: 72 mins
- Country: Japan
- Language: Japanese

Ultraman R/B The Movie (劇場版 ウルトラマンR/B(ルーブ) セレクト! 絆のクリスタル, Gekijō-ban Urutoraman Rūbu Serekuto! Kizuna no Kurisutaru; also called "Ultraman R/B the Movie: Select! The Crystal of Bond") is a 2019 Japanese superhero kaiju film, serving as the sequel and film adaptation of the 2018 Ultra Series television series Ultraman R/B. It was released in Japan on March 8, 2019.

The movie's main catchphrase is "The Minato siblings' final battle―" (湊兄妹、最後の戦い―, Minato kyōdai, saigo no tatakai -)

== Story ==
A year after the Reugosite incident, Katsumi is conflicted of what he wants to with his life while Isami and Asahi are off following their own dreams. Then, a mysterious wish-granting Ultraman named Tregear appears in Ayaka City and causes Katsumi to consider seeking for "his own dream". When monsters suddenly reappear in Ayaka City as the result of Tregear's wish granting, Katsumi and Isami are joined by their sister Asahi and Riku Asakura in fighting them and Tregear as the Minato family's strong bonds would result with the creation of Ultraman Gruebe.

== Production ==
The movie was announced at Tokyo Comic-Con on November 30, 2018. During the press conference, Yuya Hirata and Ryosuke Koike were joined by Takeshi Tsuruno, the actor of Shin Asuka in Ultraman Dyna, who would sing the ending theme of the movie with DAIGO, the actor of Nozomu Taiga in Ultraman Saga.

== Cast ==
- Katsumi Minato (湊 カツミ, Minato Katsumi): Yuya Hirata (平田 雄也, Hirata Yūya)
- Isami Minato (湊 イサミ, Minato Isami): Ryosuke Koike (小池 亮介, Koike Ryōsuke)
- Asahi Minato (湊 アサヒ, Minato Asahi): Arisa Sonohara (其原 有沙, Sonohara Arisa)
- Mio Minato (湊 ミオ, Minato Katsumi): Kaori Manabe (眞鍋 かをり, Manabe Kaori)
- Ushio Minato (湊 ウシオ, Minato Ushio): Ginnojo Yamazaki (山崎 銀之丞, Yamazaki Gin'nojō)
- Yukio Toi (戸井 ゆきお, Toi Yukio): Yukito Nishii (西井 幸人, Nishii Yukito)
- Saki Mitsurugi (美剣 サキ, Mitsurugi Saki): Ayane Kinoshita (木下 彩音, Kinoshita Ayane)
- Yuha Ninomiya (二宮 ユウハ, Ninomiya Yūha): Kanoko Sudo (須藤 叶希, Sudō Kanoko)
- Erina (えりな): Yua Shiraishi (白石 優愛, Shiraishi Yua)
- Nanaka (ななか): Nanako Ōde (大出 菜々子, Ōde Nanako)
- Chief Cabinet Secretary: Masahiro Noguchi (野口 雅弘, Noguchi Masahiro)
- Yukie Toi (戸井 幸江, Toi Yukie): Hideko Hara (原 日出子, Hara Hideko)
- Riku Asakura (朝倉 リク, Asakura Riku): Tatsuomi Hamada (濱田 龍臣, Hamada Tatsuomi)
- D.R.L.N. (ダーリン, Dārin; Voice): Kaede Yuasa (湯浅 かえで, Yuasa Kaede)
- Alien Pegassa "Pega" (ペガッサ星人 ペガ, Pegassa Seijin Pega; Voice): Megumi Han (潘 めぐみ, Han Megumi)
- Ultraman Tregear (ウルトラマントレギア, Urutoraman Toregia; Voice): Yuuma Uchida (内田 雄馬, Uchida Yūma)

== Theme song ==
- "Hikari no Kizuna" (ヒカリノキズナ; lit. "Bonds of Light")
  - Lyrics: Takeshi Tsuruno
  - Composition: DAIGO
  - Arrangement: Sho from My First Story
  - Artist: Takeshi Tsuruno (つるの 剛士, Tsuruno Takeshi) × DAIGO
