= Oyako Day =

Oyako Day is a day for parents and children in Japan to take photographs together as part of a lifelong series by photographer Bruce Osborn that explores cultural change across generations. The series has welcomed parents and children from all segments of society including, Kabuki actors, punk musicians, policemen, Buddhist monks, and porno actresses. In addition to the photo session, there are several activities including concerts, exhibitions, and contests to promote this day that celebrates the bond between parents and children. Founded in 2003 by Bruce Osborn and his wife Yoshiko, the day has since been held annually on the fourth Sunday of July, following the tradition of Mother’s Day on the second Sunday of May and Father’s Day on the third Sunday of June.

== Background ==
The name “Oyako” means “parent and child” in Japanese and was originally the name Bruce Osborn gave to a series of photographs he had been working on since 1982. “In the process of photographing hundreds of parents and children it has become my life’s work,” says Bruce. The idea for this series came to him when he was assigned to photograph punk musicians for a magazine just before the birth of his first child, at a time when he was preoccupied with thoughts of becoming a father. These thoughts converged with the assignment, leading to the first Oyako photo shoot where he decided to photograph the rockers with their parents to bring forth the differences in lifestyle and fashion between generations. “It was the coincidence of being asked to photograph punks and being an expectant father that gave birth to the idea of Oyako,” Bruce Osborn stated in an interview with Olympus.

To his surprise and delight, these pictures transcended the scope of his assignment and touched on the deeper subject of family relations. By focusing on this core relationship over 1,000 photo-shoots, he has been able to chronicle the changes Japanese society has undergone over more than twenty-five years. With years already invested in the project, Bruce and his wife decided in 2003 to take the series to the next level by organizing public photo shoots to encourage people to focus on parent-child relationships.

In an interview with Olympus in 2006 Bruce shares the insights he’s gained through Oyako Day:

“I’ve discovered just how beautiful the Japanese parent-child relationship is. It’s a bit of an oversimplification, but I think parent-child relationships in the West are more animal-like, emphasizing being strong and independent, where in Japan this relationship is more plant-like and gets intertwined like roots. I think people in other countries could benefit by learning more about Japanese culture and its special parent-child relationship. The parent-child bond is the basis of all human relations, and the world would be a better, more peaceful, place if families got on well with each other. But it takes more than just words to get this message across.”

== Participation in Oyako Day Super Photo Session ==
To participate in Oyako Day, hopeful families must send a snapshot of their family, with names and occupations, and a brief note about why they want to attend. Bruce Osborn will take photos of only one hundred of the applicant families. Each participating family will receive one free print.

== Photo contest ==
A few months before Oyako Day each year there is a photo contest for the most unforgettable family photo on a particular theme that changes yearly. The winning photos will be selected by Bruce Osborn and Oyako Committee members, and will be introduced in Mainichi Newspaper on Oyako Day and displayed on Oyako Day website at a later date.

In past years prizes have included gifts from Oyako Day sponsors like photography equipment, skin care sets, desktop printers, traditional Japanese wrapping cloth, and photography books signed by Bruce Osborn.

== Essay contest ==
Alongside the photo contest there is an essay contest during the same time frame prior to Oyako Day. The essay is open to any topic about your family and is to be 500–1000 words. Winning essays will be selected by Oyako Committee members and will be announced in Mainichi Newspaper on Oyako Day and on Oyako Day website at a later date. In past years prizes have included gifts from Oyako Day sponsors like photography equipment, skin care sets, desktop printers, traditional Japanese wrapping cloth, and photography books signed by Bruce Osborn.

== Oyako Day Exhibitions ==
The photographs from Oyako Day have been exhibited at the 21st Century Museum of Modern Art, Yamanashi Museum of Art, and Aichi Children's Center, among others.

== Publications featuring photographs from Oyako Day ==
OYAKO, An Ode to Parents and Children book, published in 2018 by Sora Books. This collection was a Tokyo International Foto Gold Award winner for Bruce in 2018.

Photographs from Oyako Day appear in the book Oyako, published by INKS inc. This book is a collection of photographs over a 16-year span of time, featuring 168 parents and children. (Text in Japanese and English).

Gomen Nasai is a book written by Mary Yamada and photographed by Bruce Osborn. This book contains interviews and photos with 20 Oyako (sets of parents and children). The parents and children discuss past actions that they would like to apologize to each other for. (Text in Japanese).

Kazoku is a collection of photographs by Bruce Osborn taken in the same style as Oyako but including all family members, not just the parents and child. (Text in Japanese).
