= Saburō Shinoda =

Japanese actor (born 1948)

- 篠田三郎
- Born: Haruo Ohtsuka; December 5, 1948 (age 77); Tokyo, Japan
- Years active: 1966–present
- Height: 1.78 m (5 ft 10 in)

Saburo Shinoda (篠田三郎, Shinoda Saburō; born December 5, 1948, in Tokyo, Japan) is a Japanese actor who has played roles in films and television dramas. He signed with Daiei film and made his film debut with Gan in 1966.

He is famous for playing the role of Kotaro Higashi in Ultraman Taro. He is the only original Ultraman actor to have not reprised his role in any other Ultraman film or television series.

== Filmography ==
=== Drama Series ===
- 1973: Ultraman Taro as Higashi Kotaro
- 1979: Kusa Moeru, Minamoto no Sanetomo
- 1984: Sanga Moyu, Keisuke Mishima
- 1988: Takeda Shingen, Yamagata Masakage
- 1989: Onihei Hankachō as Sakai
- 1994: Hana no Ran, Gan'ami
- 1996: Hideyoshi, Niwa Nagahide
- 2000: The One Stringed Harp
- 2002: Golden Bowl
- 2009: A Secret in Summer
- 2014: Mozu Season 2 - Maboroshi no Tsubasa

=== Films ===
- 1966: Gan
- 1966: Red Angel
- 1967: Zen'in shugo shirizu 1
- 1968: The Time of Reckoning
- 1968: Gamera vs. Viras
- 1970: Innocent Sinner
- 1970: High-School Boss
- 1972: Uta
- 1974: Lived in a Dream
- 1975: I Am a Cat
- 1976: Between Wife and Woman
- 1982: The Tower of Lilies
- 1982: The Imperial
- 1983: Hometown
- 1983: Okinawan Boys
- 1989: Sadako Story
- 1991: Earth
- 1992: Godzilla vs. Mothra
- 1994: Orochi, the Eight-Headed Dragon
- 1995: Godzilla vs. Destoroyah
- 2000: The Frame
- 2000: Not Forgotten
- 2002: Mori no Gakko
- 2004: Izo
- 2007: The Kiss
- 2008: Yamazakura
- 2011: Hayabusa: Back to the Earth
- 2020: Hayabusa 2: Reborn, narrator

=== TV Films ===
- 1989: Nemuri Kyōshirō
- 2012: Missing Person
- 2016: Simple is Best
