= Ultraman Taro =

Japanese television series

- Logo
- Genre: Tokusatsu; Kaiju; Superhero; Science fiction; Action/Adventure; Kyodai Hero
- Created by: Tsuburaya Productions
- Developed by: Shigemitsu Taguchi
- Directed by: Eizō Yamagiwa
- Starring: Saburō Shinoda; Akira Nagoya; Takahiko Tōno; Noboru Mitani; Kiyotaka Mitsugi; Toyoyuki Kimura; Hidesuke Tsumura; Akihiko Nishijima; Kiyoko Matsuya; Mayumi Asaka; Keiko Ono; Shinya Saitō; Peggy Hayama
- Composer: Masanobu Higurashi
- Country of origin: Japan
- No. of episodes: 53

Production
- Running time: 24 minutes (per episode)
- Production companies: Tsuburaya Productions; TBS

Original release
- Network: JNN (TBS)
- Release: April 6, 1973 – April 5, 1974

Related
- Ultraman Ace; Ultraman Leo

Ultraman Taro (ウルトラマンT(タロウ), Urutoraman Tarō) is the fifth entry (sixth overall) in the Ultra Series. Produced by Tsuburaya Productions, the series aired on Tokyo Broadcasting System from April 6, 1973, to April 5, 1974, with a total of 53 episodes.

== Plot ==
Kotaro Higashi is a wanderer who joined ZAT during his return to Japan, but his aircraft crashed and he died from severe burns while fighting Astromons. The Five Ultra Brothers brought Kotaro's body to their home world of Nebula M-78 as Mother of Ultra warped him with the Brothers' own light, turning Kōtarō into Ultraman Taro, who would now form the Six Ultra Brothers. Kotaro was taken back to Earth and defeated the aforementioned monster as his first opponent. Many foes were found that would threaten the Earth, but Taro and ZAT defeated them time and time again with occasional help from the other five Ultra Brothers and from the weaklings of monsters only Taro could defeat. During Taro's era, Birdon killed him and Zoffy but Taro was revived and killed the bird monster. After Samkujira's death, Kotaro declared his intention to continue as a human and returned the Ultra Badge back to the Mother of Ultra. Valky would return to hunt the now-human Kotaro but the latter used his own skills and quick thinking to kill the alien by luring him to an oil refinery. The series ended with ZAT bidding farewell to Kotaro as he left for parts unknown.

In the original series, Ultraman Taro was meant to be Kotaro's transformed form (while the Ultra Brothers and Mother and Father of Ultra were regarded as his non-blood family members), which explained his absence in Ultraman Leo. The Ultraman Story movie in 1984 would retcon this into providing a story of Taro being raised on the Land of Light, with Mother and Father of Ultra being his biological parents and his training was shown before he left for Earth.

== Episodes ==
No.	Title	Directed by	Written by	Original release date
1	"Mother of Ultra Is Like the Sun"; Transliteration: "Urutora no Haha wa Taiyō no Yō ni" (Japanese: ウルトラの母は太陽のように)	Eizō Yamagiwa	Shigemitsu Taguchi	April 6, 1973
2	"That Moment, Mother of Ultra..."; Transliteration: "Sono Toki Urutora no Haha wa" (Japanese: その時 ウルトラの母は)	Eizō Yamagiwa	Shigemitsu Taguchi	April 13, 1973
3	"Mother of Ultra Now and Forever"; Transliteration: "Urutora no Haha wa Itsu made mo" (Japanese: ウルトラの母はいつまでも)	Eizō Yamagiwa	Shigemitsu Taguchi	April 20, 1973
4	"Giant Sea Turtle Monsters Attack Tokyo!"; Transliteration: "Ōumigame Kaijū Tōkyō o Osō!" (Japanese: 大海亀怪獣 東京を襲う！)	Yasuo Yoshino	Shōzō Uehara	April 27, 1973
5	"Parent Star, Child Star, First Star"; Transliteration: "Oyaboshi Koboshi Ichibanboshi" (Japanese: 親星子星一番星)	Yasuo Yoshino	Shōzō Uehara	May 4, 1973
6	"Jewels Are a Monster's Meal"; Transliteration: "Hōseki wa Kaijū no Esa da!" (Japanese: 宝石は怪獣の餌だ！)	Masanori Kakehi	Shigemitsu Taguchi	May 11, 1973
7	"Heaven and Hell, the Island Moves!"; Transliteration: "Tengoku to Jigoku Shima ga Ugoita!" (Japanese: 天国と地獄 島が動いた！)	Masanori Kakehi	Toshirō Ishidō	May 18, 1973
8	"The Spirit of the Man-Eating Marsh"; Transliteration: "Hitokui Numa no Hitodama" (Japanese: 人喰い沼の人魂)	Makoto Okamura	Shigemitsu Taguchi	May 25, 1973
9	"The Day Tokyo Crumbles"; Transliteration: "Tōkyō no Kuzureru Hi" (Japanese: 東京の崩れる日)	Makoto Okamura	Toshirō Ishidō	June 1, 1973
10	"The Tusk Cross Is the Monster's Grave!"; Transliteration: "Kiba no Jūjika wa Kaijū no Hakaba da!" (Japanese: 牙の十字架は怪獣の墓場だ！)	Eizō Yamagiwa	Airaku Kido	June 8, 1973
11	"The Vampire Flower Is a Girl's Spirit"; Transliteration: "Chi o Sū Hana wa Shōjo no Sei" (Japanese: 血を吸う花は少女の精)	Eizō Yamagiwa	Airaku Kido	June 15, 1973
12	"Monster's Solo Journey"; Transliteration: "Kaijū Hitori Tabi" (Japanese: 怪獣ひとり旅)	Kiyozumi Fukazawa	Shigemitsu Taguchi	June 22, 1973
13	"The Monster's Cavity Aches!"; Transliteration: "Kaijū wa Mushiba ga Itai!" (Japanese: 怪獣の虫歯が痛い！)	Kiyozumi Fukazawa	Shigemitsu Taguchi	June 29, 1973
14	"Taro's Head Flew Off!"; Transliteration: "Tarō no Kubi ga Suttonda!" (Japanese: タロウの首がすっ飛んだ！)	Eizō Yamagiwa	Toshirō Ishidō	July 6, 1973
15	"The Girl of the Will-o'-Wisp"; Transliteration: "Aoi Kitsunebi no Shōjo" (Japanese: 青い狐火の少女)	Masanori Kakehi	Masao Saitō	July 13, 1973
16	"The Monster's Flute Sings"; Transliteration: "Kaijū no Fue ga Naru" (Japanese: 怪獣の笛がなる)	Masanori Kakehi	Shigemitsu Taguchi	July 20, 1973
17	"Two Giant Monsters Close in on Taro!"; Transliteration: "Ni Dai Kaijū Tarō ni Semaru!" (Japanese: 2大怪獣タロウに迫る！)	Kiyozumi Fukazawa	Shigemitsu Taguchi	July 27, 1973
18	"Zoffy Died! Taro Died Too!"; Transliteration: "Zofi ga Shinda! Tarō mo Shinda!" (Japanese: ゾフィが死んだ！タロウも死んだ！)	Kiyozumi Fukazawa	Shigemitsu Taguchi	August 3, 1973
19	"Mother of Ultra, Miracle of Love!"; Transliteration: "Urutora no Haha Ai no Kiseki!" (Japanese: ウルトラの母 愛の奇跡！)	Kiyozumi Fukazawa	Shigemitsu Taguchi	August 10, 1973
20	"Surprise! A Monster Fell from the Sky"; Transliteration: "Bikkuri! Kaijū ga Futtekita" (Japanese: びっくり！怪獣が降ってきた)	Masataka Yamamoto	Toshirō Ishidō	August 17, 1973
21	"The Sinking of Tokyo New Town"; Transliteration: "Tōkyō Nyū Taun Chinbotsu" (Japanese: 東京ニュータウン沈没)	Masataka Yamamoto	Shigemitsu Taguchi	August 24, 1973
22	"Wrath of the Monster with Cub!"; Transliteration: "Kozure Kaijū no Ikari!" (Japanese: 子連れ怪獣の怒り！)	Masanori Kakehi	Kiyoshi Ōhara	August 31, 1973
23	"The Gentle Monster Father!"; Transliteration: "Yasashii Kaijū Otōsan!" (Japanese: やさしい怪獣お父さん！)	Masanori Kakehi	Toshirō Ishidō	September 7, 1973
24	"This Is the Land of Ultra!"; Transliteration: "Kore ga Urutora no Kuni da!" (Japanese: これがウルトラの国だ！)	Eizō Yamagiwa	Shigemitsu Taguchi	September 14, 1973
25	"Burn! The 6 Ultra Brothers!"; Transliteration: "Moero! Urutora Roku Kyōdai" (Japanese: 燃えろ！ウルトラ6兄弟)	Eizō Yamagiwa	Shigemitsu Taguchi	September 21, 1973
26	"I Can Beat a Monster Too!"; Transliteration: "Boku ni mo Kaijū wa Taiji Dekiru!" (Japanese: 僕にも怪獣は退治できる！)	Kiyozumi Fukazawa	Bunpei Ai	September 28, 1973
27	"Here He Is! Alien Mefilas!"; Transliteration: "Deta! Mefirasu Seijin da!" (Japanese: 出た！メフィラス星人だ！)	Kiyozumi Fukazawa	Kiyoshi Ōhara	October 5, 1973
28	"Monster Eleking Barks at the Full Moon!"; Transliteration: "Kaijū Erekingu Mangetsu ni Hoeru!" (Japanese: 怪獣エレキング 満月に吼える！)	Masaru Takahashi	Toshirō Ishidō	October 12, 1973
29	"Bemstar Revives! Taro's in a Desperate Pinch!"; Transliteration: "Bemusutā Fukkatsu! Tarō Zettaizetsumei!" (Japanese: ベムスター復活！タロウ絶体絶命！)	Masataka Yamamoto	Shigemitsu Taguchi	October 19, 1973
30	"Revenge of the Monster Army!"; Transliteration: "Gyakushū! Kaijū Gundan" (Japanese: 逆襲！怪獣軍団)	Masataka Yamamoto	Shigemitsu Taguchi	October 26, 1973
31	"Watch Out! The Lying Poison Mushroom"; Transliteration: "Abunai Usotsuki Dokukinoko" (Japanese: あぶない！嘘つき毒きのこ)	Masanori Kakehi	Kiyohide Ōhara	November 2, 1973
32	"Wintry Wind Monster! Matasaburo of the Wind"; Transliteration: "Kogarashi Kaijū! Kaze no Matasaburō" (Japanese: 木枯し怪獣！風の又三郎)	Masanori Kakehi	Bunpei Ai	November 9, 1973
33	"Five Seconds Before the Great Explosion of the Land of Ultra!"; Transliteration: "Urutora no Kuni Dai Bakuhatsu Go-byō-mae!" (Japanese: ウルトラの国 大爆発5秒前！)	Tadashi Mafune	Mamoru Sasaki	November 16, 1973
34	"The Last Day of the 6 Ultra Brothers!"; Transliteration: "Urutora Roku Kyōdai Saigo no Hi!" (Japanese: ウルトラ6兄弟最後の日！)	Tadashi Mafune	Mamoru Sasaki	November 23, 1973
35	"Fatal Attack! Taro's Strike of Anger!"; Transliteration: "Hissatsu! Tarō Ikari no Ichigeki!" (Japanese: 必殺！タロウ怒りの一撃！)	Kiyozumi Fukazawa	Shigemitsu Taguchi	November 30, 1973
36	"You Swine! The Bride Cried"; Transliteration: "Hikyōmono! Hanayome wa Naita" (Japanese: ひきょうもの！花嫁は泣いた)	Kiyozumi Fukazawa	Bunpei Ai	December 7, 1973
37	"Monster, Return to Your Homeland!"; Transliteration: "Kaijū yo Furusato e Kaere!" (Japanese: 怪獣よ 故郷へ帰れ！)	Masanori Kakehi	Toshirō Ishidō	December 14, 1973
38	"The Ultra Christmas Tree"; Transliteration: "Urutora no Kurisumasu Tsurī" (Japanese: ウルトラのクリスマスツリー)	Masanori Kakehi	Shigemitsu Taguchi	December 21, 1973
39	"The Ultraman Father-and-Son's Grand Mochi Making Plan!"; Transliteration: "Urutora Oyako Mochitsuki Dai Dakusen!" (Japanese: ウルトラ父子餅つき大作戦！)	Eizō Yamagiwa	Toshirō Ishidō	December 28, 1973
40	"Surpass the Ultra Brothers!"; Transliteration: "Urutora Kyōdai o Koeteyuke!" (Japanese: ウルトラ兄弟を超えてゆけ！)	Eizō Yamagiwa	Shigemitsu Taguchi	January 4, 1974
41	"The Mother's Wish, a Midwinter's Sakura Blizzard!"; Transliteration: "Haha no Negai Mafuyu no Sakura Fubuki!" (Japanese: 母の願い 真冬の桜吹雪！)	Kiyozumi Fukazawa	Bunpei Ai	January 11, 1974
42	"The Phantom Mother Is a Monster Tamer!"; Transliteration: "Maboroshi no Haha wa Kaijū Tsukai!" (Japanese: 幻の母は怪獣使い！)	Kiyozumi Fukazawa	Kiyohide Ōhara	January 18, 1974
43	"Pickle the Monster in Salt!"; Transliteration: "Kaijū o Shiozuke ni Shiro!" (Japanese: 怪獣を塩漬にしろ！)	Tadashi Mafune	Bunpei Ai	January 25, 1974
44	"Oh! Taro's Going to Be Eaten!"; Transliteration: "A! Tarō ga Taberareru!" (Japanese: あっ！タロウが食べられる！)	Tadashi Mafune	Shigemitsu Taguchi	February 1, 1974
45	"From a Japanese Nursery Song: She Wore Red Shoes..."; Transliteration: "Nihon no Dōyō kara Akai Kutsu Haiteta..." (Japanese: 日本の童謡から 赤い靴はいてた…)	Masanori Kakehi	Bunpei Ai	February 8, 1974
46	"From a Japanese Nursery Song: The White Rabbit Is a Bad Guy!"; Transliteration: "Nihon no Dōyō kara Shiroi Usagi wa Warui Yatsu!" (Japanese: 日本の童謡から 白い兎は悪い奴！)	Masanori Kakehi	Toshirō Ishidō	February 15, 1974
47	"From a Japanese Nursery Song: Monster General"; Transliteration: "Nihon no Dōyō kara Kaijū Taishō" (Japanese: 日本の童謡から 怪獣大将)	Eizō Yamagiwa	Bunpei Ai	February 22, 1974
48	"From a Japanese Nursery Song: Monster Doll Festival"; Transliteration: "Nihon no Dōyō kara Kaijū Hinamatsuri" (Japanese: 日本の童謡から 怪獣ひなまつり)	Eizō Yamagiwa	Bunpei Ai	March 1, 1974
49	"Sing! Monster Big Match"; Transliteration: "Utae! Kaijū Biggu Matchi" (Japanese: 歌え！怪獣ビッグマッチ)	Isao Maeda	Toshirō Ishidō	March 8, 1974
50	"The Monster Sign Is V"; Transliteration: "Kaijū Sain wa Bui" (Japanese: 怪獣サインはV)	Isao Maeda	Bunpei Ai	March 15, 1974
51	"Father of Ultra and the Bride Have Come!"; Transliteration: "Urutora no Chichi to Hanayome ga Kita!" (Japanese: ウルトラの父と花嫁が来た！)	Masanori Kakehi	Bunpei Ai	March 22, 1974
52	"Steal the Life of Ultra!"; Transliteration: "Urutora no Inochi o Nusume!" (Japanese: ウルトラの命を盗め！)	Masanori Kakehi	Toshirō Ishidō	March 29, 1974
53	"Farewell, Taro and Mother of Ultra!"; Transliteration: "Saraba Tarō yo! Urutora no Haha yo!" (Japanese: さらばタロウよ！ウルトラの母よ！)	Masanori Kakehi	Shigemitsu Taguchi	April 5, 1974

== Cast ==
- Kotaro Higashi (東 光太郎, Higashi Kōtarō): Saburō Shinoda (篠田 三郎, Shinoda Saburō)
- Yūtarō Asahina (朝日奈 勇太郎, Asahina Yūtarō): Akira Nagoya (名古屋 章, Nagoya Akira)
- Shūhei Aragaki (荒垣 修平, Aragaki Shūhei): Takahiko Tōno (東野 孝彦, Tōno Takahiko)
- Tadao Nanbara (南原 忠男, Nanbara Tadao): Toyoyuki Kimura (木村 豊幸, Kimura Toyoyuki)
- Jirō Nishida (西田 次郎, Nishida Jirō): Kiyotaka Mitsugi (三ツ木 清隆, Mitsugi Kiyotaka)
- Izumi Moriyama (森山 いずみ, Moriyama Izumi): Kiyoko Matsuya (松谷 紀代子, Matsuya Kiyoko)
- Lady in Green (緑のおばさん, Midori no Obasan)/Mother of Ultra (ウルトラの母, Urutora no Haha; Voice): Peggy Hayama (ペギー 葉山, Pegī Hayama)
- Tetsuya Kitajima (北島 哲也, Kitajima Tetsuya): Hidesuke Tsumura (津村 秀祐, Tsumura Hidesuke)
- Takashi Ueno (上野 孝, Ueno Takashi): Akihiko Nishijima (西島 明彦, Nishijima Akihiko)
- Kazumi Nitani (二谷 一美, Nitani Kazumi): Noboru Mitani (三谷 昇, Mitani Noboru)
- Saori Shiratori (白鳥 さおり, Shiratori Saori): Mayumi Asaka (あさか まゆみ, Asaka Mayumi; 1-16), Keiko Ono (小野 恵子, Ono Keiko; 20-53)
- Kenichi Shiratori (白鳥 健一, Shiratori Ken'ichi): Shinya Saitō (斎藤 信也, Saitō Shin'ya)
- Narrator: Tetsurō Sagawa (瑳川 哲朗, Sagawa Tetsurō; 1-50), Akira Nagoya (51-53)

== Songs ==
Opening theme

- "Ultraman Taro" (ウルトラマンタロウ, Urutoraman Tarō)
  - Lyrics: Yū Aku (阿久 悠, Aku Yū)
  - Composition and arrangement: Makoto Kawaguchi (川口 真, Kawaguchi Makoto)
  - Artist: Tarō Takemura (武村 太郎, Takemura Tarō), Mizuumi Boys & Girls Chorus (少年少女合唱団みずうみ, Shōnen Shōjo Gasshōdan Mizuumi)

Insert themes

- "Ultra Roku Kyōdai" (ウルトラ六兄弟, Urutora Roku Kyōdai; lit. "The 6 Ultra Brothers")
  - Lyrics: Yū Aku
  - Composition & Arrangement: Makoto Kawaguchi
  - Artist: Tarō Takemura, Mizuumi Boys and Girls Choir
  - Episodes 18, 25, 33–34
- "Ultra no Haha no Ballad" (ウルトラの母のバラード, Urutora no Haha no Barādo; lit. "Ballad of Mother of Ultra")
  - Lyrics: Shigemitsu Taguchi (田口 成光, Taguchi Shigemitsu)
  - Composition & Arrangement: Tōru Fuyuki (冬木 透, Fuyuki Tōru)
  - Artist: Toshiko Fujita (藤田 淑子, Fujita Toshiko)
  - Episodes: 38, 53

== Home media ==
In July 2019, Mill Creek Entertainment announced that it had acquired most of the Ultraman library from Tsuburaya Productions through Indigo Entertainment, including 1,100 TV episodes and 20 films. The series was released on Blu-ray and digital on January 12, 2021, in standard and steelbook sets.

In July 2020, Shout! Factory announced to have struck a multi-year deal with Alliance Entertainment and Mill Creek, with the blessings of Tsuburaya and Indigo, that granted them the exclusive SVOD and AVOD digital rights to the Ultra series and films (1,100 TV episodes and 20 films) acquired by Mill Creek the previous year. Ultraman Taro, amongst other titles, will stream in the United States and Canada through Shout! Factory TV and Tokushoutsu.
