= Ultraman Taiga =

Japanese TV series

- Title card
- Genre: Tokusatsu; Kyodai Hero; Kaiju; Science fiction; Drama
- Created by: Tsuburaya Productions
- Screenplay by: Aya Satsuki; Junichiro Ashiki; Sachio Yanai; Uiko Miura; Hirotoshi Kobayashi; Kyoko Katsuya; Misaki Morie
- Story by: Sotaro Hayashi; Takao Nakano
- Directed by: Ryuichi Ichino (Note: Series director. Episodes directors are Makoto Kamiya, Kiyotaka Taguchi, Masayoshi Takesue, Takanori Tsujimoto, Ryo Ikeda, and Tomoyasu Koshi.)
- Starring: Yuki Inoue; Ryotaro; Ayuri Yoshinaga; Kou Nanase; Chiharu Niiyama
- Opening theme: "Buddy, steady, go!"; by Takuma Terashima
- Ending theme: "Hitotsuboshi"; by Sayaka Sasaki; "Sign"; by Sphere
- Composer: Yuya Mori
- Country of origin: Japan
- Original language: Japanese
- No. of episodes: 26

Production
- Executive producer: Masahiro Onda
- Producers: Kazuyuki Murayama; Yusuke Okamoto; Aya Yoshino; Hayato Saga
- Cinematography: Takeshi Arai
- Editors: Yosuke Yafune; Hisashi Moritsu; Shigeo Okuda
- Running time: 25 minutes
- Production companies: Tsuburaya Productions; TV Tokyo; Dentsu

Original release
- Network: TXN (TV Tokyo)
- Release: July 6 – December 28, 2019

Related
- Ultraman R/B; Ultraman Z

Ultraman Taiga (ウルトラマン タイガ, Urutoraman Taiga) is a Japanese tokusatsu drama produced by Tsuburaya Productions. It is the 24th entry (34th overall) in the Ultra Series, the eighth entry in the "New Generation Heroes" lineup and the first series released in the Reiwa era. It began airing on TV Tokyo on July 6, 2019.

The series's main catchphrases are "The story of the son of "Taro". And "Taiga" is here!" (「タロウ」の息子の物語。そして「タイガ」がここにいる！, Tarō no musuko no monogatari. Soshite Taiga ga koko ni iru!) and "Let's go, buddy! Buddy Go!" (行くぜ相棒！バディゴー！, Iku ze aibō! Badi Gō!).

== Synopsis ==
12 years prior, Tregear incapacitated the New Generation Heroes after misleading them to a minefield asteroid. Inheriting their powers, the Tri-Squad attempted to continue the battle but it leads to their particles scattered in outer space. Taiga's particle of light merged with a young boy named Hiroyuki to save him from a fall after his Guesra companion "Chibisuke" was kidnapped.

In the present day, Hiroyuki joined a private security organization E.G.I.S. (Enterprise of Guard and Investigation Services) to handle extraterrestrial cases while living in a society mixed with aliens from various point of origin. While handling a Villain Guild-related case, a fully recuperated Taiga awakens and therefore allows Hiroyuki to transform in order to combat giant monsters as two other Tri-Squad members, Titas and Fuma made their way to Earth and bonded with the former as a shared host. Tregear on the other hand was revealed to have been anticipating the Tri-Squad's arrival and orchestrated several monster and alien attacks for his own twisted enjoyment of tormenting others. In the middle of the series, his true agenda was revealed to corrupt Taiga into an evil Ultraman in order to fulfill his twisted vendetta against the former's father, Taro. Hiroyuki and the Tri-Squad's sheer bond purified Taiga and gave them the ability to fuse into Ultraman Taiga Tri-Strium. Growing desperate for the situation, Tregear initially tries to harass the E.G.I.S. members and eventually summoned the planet-devouring monster Woola to Earth for his final endgame to consume both light and darkness.

As the tension between humans and aliens begin to grow, Pirika's attempt to sacrifice herself in order to eliminate Woola leads to the realization that it was only cursed by its own hunger. Former Villain Guild members Alien Magma and Merkind offer their assistance to neutralize Woola as Taiga fed the monster with his and Tregear's energy, ending the monster's life in a peaceful way. After rejecting his last chance at redemption, Tregear fought against Taiga Tri-Strium and seemingly obliterated by exposing himself to the Quattro Squad Blaster, seeing Taro's image in the young hero in his final moments.

== Episodes ==
No.	Title	Written by	Original release date
0	"Ultraman Taiga Story"; Transliteration: "Urutoraman Taiga Sutōrī" (Japanese: ウルトラマンタイガ物語(ストーリー))	Unknown	June 22, 2019
1	"Buddy Go!"; Transliteration: "Badi Gō!" (Japanese: バディゴー！)	Sotaro Hayashi	July 6, 2019
2	"Tregear"; Transliteration: "Toregia" (Japanese: トレギア)	Takao Nakano	July 13, 2019
3	"Avenger of the Star"; Transliteration: "Hoshi no Fukushūsha" (Japanese: 星の復讐者)	Sotaro Hayashi	July 20, 2019
4	"Requiem of the Wolves"; Transliteration: "Gunrō no Banka" (Japanese: 群狼の挽歌)	Takao Nakano	July 27, 2019
5	"The Future You Decide"; Transliteration: "Kimi no Kimeru Mirai" (Japanese: きみの決める未来)	Aya Satsuki	August 3, 2019
6	"The Flying Saucer Is Not Coming"; Transliteration: "Enban ga Konai" (Japanese: 円盤が来ない)	Junichiro Ashiki	August 10, 2019
7	"To the Demon's Mountain!!"; Transliteration: "Ma no Yama e!!" (Japanese: 魔の山へ!!)	Sotaro Hayashi	August 17, 2019
8	"Defeat the Demon"; Transliteration: "Akuma o Ute" (Japanese: 悪魔を討て)	Sotaro Hayashi	August 24, 2019
9	"The Present for Each"; Transliteration: "Sorezore no Ima" (Japanese: それぞれの今)	Uiko Miura	August 31, 2019
10	"Warriors in the Evening Glow"; Transliteration: "Yūbae no Senshi" (Japanese: 夕映えの戦士)	Sachio Yanai	September 7, 2019
11	"One Afternoon When the Magic Was Lost from the Star"; Transliteration: "Hoshi no Mahō ga Kieta Gogo" (Japanese: 星の魔法が消えた午後)	Hirotoshi Kobayashi	September 14, 2019
12	"Even Then, the Universe Will Still Go on Dreaming"; Transliteration: "Soredemo Uchū wa Yume o Miru" (Japanese: それでも宇宙は夢を見る)	Hirotoshi Kobayashi	September 21, 2019
13	"E.G.I.S. Major Confrontation"; Transliteration: "Ījisu Chō Kaigi" (Japanese: イージス超会議)	Junichiro Ashiki	September 28, 2019
14	"The Power to Protect and the Power to Fight"; Transliteration: "Mamoru Chikara to Tatakau Chikara" (Japanese: 護る力と闘う力)	Kyoko Katsuya	October 5, 2019
15	"I Can't Hear Your Voice"; Transliteration: "Kimi no Koe ga Kikoenai" (Japanese: キミの声が聞こえない)	Takao Nakano	October 12, 2019
16	"We Are One"; Transliteration: "Warera wa Hitotsu" (Japanese: 我らは一つ)	Sotaro Hayashi	October 19, 2019
17	"Guardian Angel"; Transliteration: "Gādian Enjeru" (Japanese: ガーディアンエンジェル)	Sachio Yanai	October 26, 2019
18	"For the New World"; Transliteration: "Atarashiki Sekai no Tame ni" (Japanese: 新しき世界のために)	Junichiro Ashiki	November 2, 2019
19	"Withstand the Lightning Strike!"; Transliteration: "Raigeki o Hanekaese!" (Japanese: 雷撃を跳ね返せ！)	Misaki Morie	November 9, 2019
20	"Sand Castle"; Transliteration: "Suna no Oshiro" (Japanese: 砂のお城)	Takao Nakano	November 16, 2019
21	"Friend in Earth"; Transliteration: "Hoshi no Yūjin" (Japanese: 地球の友人)	Hirotoshi Kobayashi	November 23, 2019
22	"What's Up With Takkong?"; Transliteration: "Takkongu wa Nazo da" (Japanese: タッコングは謎だ)	Sachio Yanai	November 30, 2019
23	"Clash! Ultra Big Match!"; Transliteration: "Gekitotsu! Urutora Biggu Matchi!" (Japanese: 激突！ウルトラビッグマッチ！)	Aya Satsuki	December 7, 2019
24	"I'm Pirika"; Transliteration: "Watashi wa Pirika" (Japanese: 私はピリカ)	Takao Nakano	December 14, 2019
25	"Buddy, Steady, Go!"; Transliteration: "Badi Sutedi Gō!" (Japanese: バディ ステディ ゴー！)	Sotaro Hayashi	December 21, 2019
26	"And Taiga Is Here"; Transliteration: "Soshite Taiga ga Koko ni Iru" (Japanese: そしてタイガがここにいる)	Ryo Ikeda	December 28, 2019

== Ultra Galaxy Fight: New Generation Heroes ==
Ultra Galaxy Fight: New Generation Heroes (ウルトラギャラクシーファイト ニュージェネレーションヒーローズ, Urutora Gyarakushī Faito Nyū Jenerēshon Hīrōzu) is the first of the Ultra Galaxy Fight miniseries, airing from September 29 to December 22, 2019, while coinciding its release with the second half of Ultraman Taiga. The end of New Generation Heroes lead to the cold opening of Ultraman Taiga picking off where the titular team were chasing Tregear while the Tri-Squad continue the fight in their predecessors' place. In addition, the miniseries imported characters from different multimedia instalments of Ultra Series, the antagonist Ultra Dark-Killer from the pachinko game series and Ultraman Ribut from Tsuburaya Productions' previous collaboration Upin & Ipin animation series.

== Ultraman Taiga The Movie ==
Ultraman Taiga The Movie (劇場版 ウルトラマンタイガ ニュージェネクライマックス, Gekijō-ban Urutoraman Taiga Nyū Jene Kuraimakkusu; also called "Ultraman Taiga The Movie: New Generation Climax") is the film adaptation of Ultraman Taiga announced on December 15, 2019, at Tokyo Dome City during Tsuburaya Productions' Tsubucon. In addition to the original cast members of the series, the movie incorporates guest appearance of the previous New Generation Heroes. The movie was initially delayed from its original release date (March 6, 2020) as a result of the ongoing COVID-19 pandemic in Japan before it received a new one on August 7.

The film centers around Hiroyuki as the target of an unidentified opponent, forcing other members of the New Generation Heroes to appear one after another and together challenge the power of a great darkness. In addition, Taiga's father, Ultraman Taro, has come to Earth but attacked his own son under mysterious circumstances.

== Tri-Squad Voice Drama ==
Tri-Squad Voice Drama (トライスクワッド ボイスドラマ, Torai Sukuwaddo Boisu Dorama) is an audio drama streamed on Tsuburaya Productions' YouTube channel.

1. Future Memories: Part 1 (未来の思い出 前編, Mirai no Omoide Zenpen)
2. Future Memories: Part 2 (未来の思い出 後編, Mirai no Omoide Kōhen)
3. The Return of Titas (タイタスの帰還, Taitasu no Kikan)
4. Who Is the Leader? (リーダーは誰だ, Rīdā wa Dare da)
5. The Ultraman Titas: Part 1 (ザ★ウルトラマンタイタス 前編, Za Urutoraman Taitasu Zenpen)
6. The Ultraman Titas: Part 2 (ザ★ウルトラマンタイタス 中編, Za Urutoraman Taitasu Chūhen)
7. The Ultraman Titas: Part 3 (ザ★ウルトラマンタイタス 後編, Za Urutoraman Taitasu Kōhen)
8. The Next Opportunity (次の機会に, Tsugi no Kikai ni)
9. A Loser's Son: Part 1 (負け犬の子 前編, Makeinu no Ko Zenpen)
10. A Loser's Son: Part 2 (負け犬の子 中編, Makeinu no Ko Chūhen)
11. A Loser's Son: Part 3 (負け犬の子 後編, Makeinu no Ko Kōhen)
12. If You Could Be a Teacher (もしも教師になったら, Moshimo Kyōshi ni Nattara)
13. Who Do Those Fists Fight For: Part 1 (その拳は誰がために 前編, Sono Kobushi wa Ta ga Tame ni Zenpen)
14. Who Do Those Fists Fight For: Part 2 (その拳は誰がために 中編, Sono Kobushi wa Ta ga Tame ni Chūhen)
15. Who Do Those Fists Fight For: Part 3 (その拳は誰がために 後編, Sono Kobushi wa Ta ga Tame ni Kōhen)
16. The Next Opportunity: Part 2 (次の機会に part2, Tsugi no Kikai ni Pāto Tsū)
17. The Fierce Battle on the Golden Planet: Part 1 (黄金惑星の激闘 前編, Ōgon Wakusei no Gekitō Zenpen)
18. The Fierce Battle on the Golden Planet: Part 2 (黄金惑星の激闘 中編, Ōgon Wakusei no Gekitō Chūhen)
19. The Fierce Battle on the Golden Planet: Part 3 (黄金惑星の激闘 後編, Ōgon Wakusei no Gekitō Kōhen)
20. All Terrible-Monsters Attack (超獣総進撃, Chōjū Sōshingeki)
21. Wind and Flower: Part 1 (風と花 前編, Kaze to Hana Zenpen)
22. Wind and Flower: Part 2 (風と花 後編, Kaze to Hana Kōhen)
23. How Do You Judge Whether Someone Is Your Superior? (目上の人かの判断ってどこでする？, Meue no Hito ka no Handan-tte Doko de Suru?)
24. Thank You (ありがとな, Arigato na)

In addition to the serial above, special episodes were also included in different publications:

1. The Tri-Squad Starts! (トライスクワッド始動！, Torai Sukuwaddo Shidō!), is included on the music album Ultraman Taiga Character Song CD.
2. The Miracle of Christmas Night (奇跡はクリスマスの夜に, Kiseki wa Kurisumasu no Yoru ni), is included in Ultraman Taiga Blu-ray Box I release on November 25, 2019.
3. Defeat the Godmes (ゴドメスを討て, Godomesu o Ute), is included in Ultraman Taiga Blu-ray Box II release on February 27, 2020.

== Other media ==
=== Succeeding appearances ===
- Ultra Galaxy Fight: The Absolute Conspiracy (2020): The Tri-Squad made their return as one of the miniseries' characters. It also featured an alternate version of Tregear's past self as one of the miniseries' major characters.

== Production and casting ==
Ultraman Taiga was officially announced on April 18, 2019, by Tsuburaya Production on their website.

== Cast ==
- Hiroyuki Kudo (工藤 ヒロユキ, Kudō Hiroyuki): Yuki Inoue (井上 祐貴, Inoue Yūki)
- Homare Souya (宗谷 ホマレ, Sōya Homare): Ryotaro (諒太郎, Ryōtarō)
- Pirika Asahikawa (旭川 ピリカ, Asahikawa Pirika): Ayuri Yoshinaga (吉永 アユリ, Yoshinaga Ayuri) (Note: Pirika Ashikawa's original actress, Momoka (桃果) was changed to Ayuri Yoshinaga due to scheduling conflict.)
- Kirisaki (霧崎): Kou Nanase (七瀬 公, Nanase Kō)
- Kana Sasaki (佐々木 カナ, Sasaki Kana): Chiharu Niiyama (新山 千春, Niiyama Chiharu)

=== Voice cast ===
- Ultraman Taiga (ウルトラマンタイガ, Urutoraman Taiga): Takuma Terashima (寺島 拓篤, Terashima Takuma)
- Ultraman Titas (ウルトラマンタイタス, Urutoraman Taitasu): Satoshi Hino (日野 聡, Hino Satoshi)
- Ultraman Fuma (ウルトラマンフーマ, Urutoraman Fūma): Shōta Hayama (葉山 翔太, Hayama Shōta)
- Ultraman Tregear (ウルトラマントレギア, Urutoraman Toregia): Yuma Uchida (内田 雄馬, Uchida Yūma)
- Narrator: Daisuke Ono (小野 大輔, Ono Daisuke)

=== Guest cast ===
- Ultraman Taro (ウルトラマンタロウ, Urutoraman Tarō; Voice; 0–1, 16): Hiroya Ishimaru (石丸 博也, Ishimaru Hiroya)
- Ultraman Ginga (ウルトラマンギンガ, Urutoraman Ginga; Voice; 1): Takuya Negishi (根岸 拓哉, Negishi Takuya)
- Inspector Sakura (佐倉警部, Sakura-keibu; 2, 4, 20, 25): Shingo Kazami (風見 しんご, Kazami Shingo)
- Rento Kujo (九条 レント, Kujō Rento; 3): Kenta Mishima (三嶋 健太, Mishima Kenta)
- Man Who Wants to Return to the Star (星に帰りたい男, Hoshi ni Kaeritai Otoko; 6): Hiroyuki Takano (高野 浩幸, Takano Hiroyuki)
- Ai Tennoji (天王寺 藍, Ten'nōji Ai; 7–8): Sora Kurumi (胡桃 そら, Kurumi Sora)
- Oda (小田; 10): Tamotsu Ishibashi (石橋 保, Ishibashi Tamotsu)
- Maria (麻璃亜; 11–12): Ryoka Oshima (大島 涼花, Ōshima Ryōka)
- Honoka Kanzaki (神崎 穂花, Kanzaki Honoka; 11): Kaoru Ukawa (鵜川 薫, Ukawa Kaoru)
- Alien Semon Meed (セモン星人 ミード, Semon Seijin Mīdo; 18): Sento Takemori (竹森 千, Takemori Sento)
- Ultraman Zero (ウルトラマンゼロ, Urutoraman Zero; Voice; 23): Mamoru Miyano (宮野 真守, Miyano Mamoru)

== Songs ==
Opening theme

- "Buddy, steady, go!"
  - Composition & Arrangement: Cher Watanabe (渡部 チェル, Watanabe Cheru)
  - Lyrics & Artist: Takuma Terashima (寺島 拓篤, Terashima Takuma)
  - Episodes: 1–13, 26 (Verse 1), 14–24 (Verse 2)
  In episode 25, this song is played as an ending theme.

Ending themes

- "Hitotsuboshi" (ヒトツボシ; lit. "Evening Star")
  - Composition & Arrangement: Shota Horie (堀江 晶太, Horie Shōta)
  - Lyrics & Artist: Sayaka Sasaki (佐咲 紗花, Sasaki Sayaka)
  - Episodes: 1–13
  In episode 26, this song is played as an insert theme.
- "Sign"
  - Lyrics: Yohei Matsui (松井 洋平, Matsui Yōhei)
  - Composition & Arrangement: Yuki Honda (本多 友紀, Honda Yūki) (Arte Refact)
  - Artist: Sphere
  - Episodes: 14–24
  In episode 26, this song is played as an insert theme.

Insert themes

- Hadō o Iku Kaze no Gotoshi (覇道を往く風の如し; lit. "Like the Wind Going Down the Road")
  - Lyrics: Erica Masaki (真崎 エリカ, Masaki Erika)
  - Composition & Arrangement: Kyohei Yamamoto (山本 恭平, Yamamoto Kyōhei) (Arte Refact)
  - Artist: Ultraman Fuma (Shōta Hayama)
  - Episodes: 13, 22
- WISE MAN'S PUNCH
  - Lyrics: Erica Masaki
  - Composition & Arrangement: Atsushi Harada (原田 篤, Harada Atsushi) (Arte Refact)
  - Artist: Ultraman Titas (Satoshi Hino)
  - Episodes: 13
- "Chō Yūsha Buddy Go!" (超勇者BUDDY GO!, Chō Yūsha Badi Gō!; lit. "Super Hero BUDDY GO!")
  - Lyrics: Erica Masaki
  - Composition: Yuki Honda (Arte Refact)
  - Arrangement: Masatomi Waki (脇 眞富, Waki Masatomi) (Arte Refact)
  - Artist: Ultraman Taiga (Takuma Terashima)
  - Episodes: 13, 26

== International broadcast ==
In Hong Kong, this series aired on ViuTV on July 4, 2020.

== See also ==
- Ultra Series - Complete list of official Ultraman-related shows.
