= Hiroya Ishimaru =

Japanese retired actor and narrator (born 1941)

- 石丸 博也
- Born: Shinji Ishide (石出 伸二); February 12, 1941 (age 85); Miyagi Prefecture, Japan
- Occupations: Actor; voice actor; narrator
- Years active: 1960–2023
- Agent(s): Production Baobab (Treated as an archive and still belongs to)

Hiroya Ishimaru (石丸 博也, Ishimaru Hiroya; born Shinji Ishide (石出 伸二, Ishide Shinji), February 12, 1941) is a retired Japanese actor, voice actor, and narrator most famous for voicing Koji Kabuto in the 1972 series Mazinger Z and its sequels, and for being the official Japanese dub voice for Jackie Chan. He is also a fluent English speaker.

On April 27, 2023, Ishimaru announced his retirement from voice acting, though he continues to work in a limited capacity dubbing Chan in films.

== Filmography ==
=== Television animation ===
- Mazinger Z (1972) (Koji Kabuto)
- Future Boy Conan (1978) (Orlo)
- Space Battleship Yamato II (1978) (Cosmodart Nasca)
- Starzinger (1978) (Jan Kugo)
- Ashita no Joe 2 (1980) (Tiger Ozaki)
- Dancouga – Super Beast Machine God (1985) (Professor Kotarō Hazuki)
- Transformers: The Headmasters (1987) (Rodimus Convoy and Hot Rodimus)
- Godannar (2003) (Tatsuya Aoi)
- Kenichi: The Mightiest Disciple (2006) (Apachai Hopachai)
- Gintama (2008) (Captain Dragon (ep. 109))
- Ixion Saga DT (2012) (Father)
- Tokyo Ravens (2013) (Daizen Amami)
- One Piece (2021) (Kōzuki Oden)
- Princess Principal (2017) (Beatrice (Imitation Voice (other by Fukushi Ochiai, Motomu Kiyokawa, Tesshō Genda, Kōsei Hirota) "Telephone partner") (ep. 9))

=== Theatrical animation ===
- Mazinger Z vs. Devilman (1973) (Kouji Kabuto)
- Doraemon: Nobita's Three Visionary Swordsmen (1994) (Dragon)
- Crayon Shin-chan: Fierceness That Invites Storm! Yakiniku Road of Honor (2003) (Man of sanitary gown)
- Mazinger Z: Infinity (2018)

=== Video games ===
- Castlevania: Rondo of Blood (1993) (Count Dracula)
- Ehrgeiz: God Bless the Ring (1998) (Koji Masuda)
- Final Fantasy IV (Nintendo DS version) (2007) (Edward "Edge" Geraldine)
- Imagin Anime 3: You Will Find the Ul*ra Planet (2008) (Ultraman Taro)
- Kung Fu Rider (2010) (Tobio)
- Street Fighter X Tekken (2012) (Lei Wulong)
- Dissidia Final Fantasy Opera Omnia (2017) (Edward "Edge" Geraldine)
- Tekken series (Lei Wulong [Tekken 3 - Tekken 5 (battle grunts in Tekken 6 - Tekken 7])

=== Original video animation (OVA) ===
- Legend of the Galactic Heroes (1989) (Karl Robert Steinmetz)
- Cyber City Oedo 808 (1990) (Shunsuke Sengoku)
- Mazinkaiser (2001) (Koji Kabuto)

=== Tokusatsu ===
- Kamen Rider (1971) – (Shocker Scientist/Construction site worker/Prison guard) (actor) (4 episodes)
- Ultraman Story (1984) (Ultraman Taro)
- Ultraman Mebius (2006) (Ultraman Taro)
- Juken Sentai Gekiranger (2007) (Sharkie Chan (eps. 17 - 49))
- Ultraman Ginga (2013) (Ultraman Taro)
- Ultraman Ginga S (2014) (Ultraman Taro/Strium Brace)
- Ultraman Taiga (2019) (Ultraman Taro) (ep.1)

=== Live-action ===
- Kamen Rider (1971) (Shocker Scientist (ep. 1))
- Ultraman Leo (1975) (Professor Nakamoto (ep. 40))

=== Dubbing roles ===
==== Live-action ====
- Jackie Chan
  - Hand of Death (Tan Feng)
  - Killer Meteors (Immortal Meteor)
  - New Fist of Fury (Cheng Long / Sing Lung / Ah Lung / Dragon)
  - Shaolin Wooden Men (Little Mute)
  - To Kill with Intrigue (Hsiao Lei)
  - Drunken Master (Freddie Wong)
  - Half a Loaf of Kung Fu (Jiang)
  - Magnificent Bodyguards (Lord Ting Chung)
  - Snake & Crane Arts of Shaolin (Hsu Yin-Fung)
  - Spiritual Kung Fu (Yi-Lang)
  - Snake in the Eagle's Shadow (Chien Fu)
  - Dragon Fist (Tang How-yuen)
  - The Fearless Hyena (Shing Lung)
  - Master with Cracked Fingers (Lung / Jackie)
  - The Big Brawl (Jerry Kwan)
  - The Young Master (Dragon Lung)
  - Dragon Lord (Dragon Ho)
  - Fantasy Mission Force (Sammy)
  - Fearless Hyena Part II (Cheng Lung)
  - Project A (Sergeant Dragon Ma)
  - Winners and Sinners (CID 07 / Cop #7086)
  - Pom Pom (CID 07 / Cop #7086)
  - Wheels on Meals (Thomas)
  - My Lucky Stars (Muscles)
  - Police Story (Sergeant "Kevin" Chan Ka-kui)
  - The Protector (Billy Wong)
  - Twinkle, Twinkle, Lucky Stars (Muscles)
  - Heart of Dragon (Ted / Tat Fung)
  - Armour of God (Jackie)
  - Project A Part II (Sergeant Dragon Ma)
  - Dragons Forever (Jackie Lung)
  - Police Story 2 (Sergeant "Kevin" Chan Ka-kui)
  - Miracles ('Charlie' Kuo Chen Wah)
  - Island of Fire (Da Chui)
  - Armour of God II: Operation Condor (Jackie)
  - Police Story 3: Super Cop (RHKP Inspector "Kevin" Chan Ka-kui)
  - Twin Dragons (Ma Yau / Bok Min)
  - The Legend of the Drunken Master (Wong Fei Hung)
  - Rumble in the Bronx (Ma Hon Keung)
  - Rush Hour (Detective Inspector Yang Naing Lee)
  - Shanghai Noon (Chon Wang)
  - Rush Hour 2 (Chief Inspector Lee)
  - The Tuxedo (James "Jimmy" Tong / Clark Devlin)
  - New Police Story (Chief Inspector Chan Kwok-wing)
  - Rob-B-Hood (Thongs)
  - Rush Hour 3 (Chief Inspector Yan Naing Lee)
  - The Forbidden Kingdom (Lu Yan / Hop)
  - Shinjuku Incident (Steelhead / Nick)
  - Looking for Jackie (Jackie Chan)
  - The Spy Next Door (Bob Ho)
  - The Karate Kid (Mr. Han)
  - Police Story 2013 (Detective Zhong Wen)
  - As the Light Goes Out(Jackie Chan)
  - Dragon Blade (Huo An)
  - Skiptrace (Bennie Chan)
  - Kung Fu Yoga (Jack)
  - Bleeding Steel (Lin Dong)
  - The Foreigner (Ngoc Minh Quan)
  - The Knight of Shadows: Between Yin and Yang (Pu Songling)
  - Viy 2: Journey to China (Master)
  - Vanguard (Tang Huanting)
  - Ride On (Lao Luo)
  - Panda Plan (Jackie Chan)
  - Karate Kid: Legends (Mr. Han)
- The Amityville Horror (1982 NTV edition) (Jimmy (Marc Vahanian))
- The Big Gundown (1979 TV Asahi edition) (Manuel "Cucillo" Sanchez (Tomas Milian))
- Carrie (Principal Henry Morton (Barry Shabaka Henley))
- Cloud Atlas (Captain Molyneux, Vyvyan Ayrs, Timothy Cavendish, Korean Musician, Prescient 2 (Jim Broadbent))
- Dawn of the Dead (Roger "Trooper" DeMarco (Scott Reiniger))
- Die Hard (1990 TV Asahi edition) (Harry Ellis (Hart Bochner))
- Eaten Alive (Buck (Robert Englund))
- F/X: The Series (Rollie Tyler (Cameron Daddo))
- The Killer (Detective Li Ying (Danny Lee))
- Night of the Living Dead (Sheriff McClelland (George Kosana))
- Numb3rs (Larry Fleinhardt (Peter MacNicol))
- The Rock (Major Tom Baxter (David Morse))
- Scarface (1989 TV Asahi edition) (Manolo "Manny Ray" Ribera (Steven Bauer))
- Texas, Adios (1989 TV Tokyo edition) (Jim Sullivan (Cole Kitosch))
- Thunderbird 6 (Scott Tracy)
- Thunderbirds Are Go (Scott Tracy)
- Tourist Trap (Jerry (Jon Van Ness))
- The Towering Inferno (1984 NTV edition) (Roger Simmons (Richard Chamberlain))
- West Side Story (1979 TBS edition) (Big Deal (Anthony 'Scooter' Teague), Pepe (Jay Norman))

==== Animation ====
- The Simpsons (1989), Lionel Hutz (Phil Hartman)
- Jackie Chan Adventures (?), Jackie Chan
- Kung Fu Panda (?), Monkey
- Kung Fu Panda 2 (?), Monkey
- Kung Fu Panda 3 (?), Monkey
- Police Academy: The Animated Series (?), Carey Mahoney
- Secrets of the Furious Five (?), Young Monkey
- Transformers: Animated (?), Rodimus Minor

Mickey Mouse Adventures Movie (1998) Don Carnage
