= List of Ultraman Taiga characters =

Characters from the Japanese television series Ultraman Taiga

This is the character list of 2019 Ultra Series Ultraman Taiga. Starting with September 29, 2019, the show coincided its airing with YouTube-exclusive miniseries Ultra Galaxy Fight: New Generation Heroes.

== E.G.I.S. ==
The Enterprise of Guard and Investigation Services (警備及び調査を専門とする会社, Keibi Oyobi Chōsa o Senmon to Suru Kaisha), abbreviated as E.G.I.S. (イージス, Ījisu), is a private security organization which handles alien-related cases on a daily basis.

=== Hiroyuki Kudo ===
Hiroyuki Kudo (工藤 ヒロユキ, Kudō Hiroyuki) (Note: His given name is written in kanji as "優幸".) is the 22-year-old protagonist who has a kind personality and strong sense of justice, dreaming of becoming a bridge between humankind, aliens and Ultramen.

As a child, Hiroyuki tried to save Chibisuke from the Lecuumm alien but was rescued by Taiga's wandering particles of light to survive his fall. During his adulthood and membership in E.G.I.S., Hiroyuki was given the means to become Taiga during combat and eventually two other members of Tri-Squad that made their way to Earth. After his attempt in freeing Taiga from Tregear's corruption, he was accepted as the honorary member of the Tri-Squad. In the final episodes, Hiroyuki's double life as a Tri-Squad member was revealed to have been known by Kana and Homare, both of them chastise him for his poor attempt in keeping secret.

In Ultraman Taiga The Movie, Hiroyuki becomes the target of the Villain Guild, which led to the members of New Generation Heroes appearing one after another to protect him. Hiroyuki became reckless in the fight, which resulted in Taiga's concern for the youth.

Hiroyuki Kudo is portrayed by Yuki Inoue (井上 祐貴, Inoue Yūki). As a child, Hiroyuki is portrayed by Kōki Ishige (石毛 宏樹, Ishige Kōki).

=== Homare Soya ===
Homare Soya (宗谷 ホマレ, Sōya Homare) is a 25-year-old member with a sense of justice and is faithful to any given mission. He is Hiroyuki's senior and is often enraged when the former ran away in important missions. As he often took on dangerous tasks, Homare puts his high physicality to use while usually partnering with Hiroyuki.

In his past, Homare was actually an Alien Amayarm (アマヤルム星人, Amayarumu Seijin) banished from his homeworld and made his reputation as a renowned fighter in an alien gang. He provided refuge to an outcast Volk and joined the Villain Guild at a very young age but quit it after finding a new resolve in his life, which led to his membership in E.G.I.S.. Despite his human-like appearance, Homare displays several of his alien physicality, including the ability to jump from high places and break free from metal chains.

Homare Soya is portrayed by Ryotaro (諒太郎, Ryōtarō).

=== Pirika Asahikawa ===
Pirika Asahikawa (旭川 ピリカ, Asahikawa Pirika) is a 23-year-old operator who is capable of handling cyber security-related cases. Although usually did her job from the office, she can also participate in outside missions, having did so to replace Hiroyuki due to his arm injury.

Her true identity is an android named Pirika 03 (ピリカ03, Pirika Zero San), one of the many androids created by scientists of Planet Eomapp (エオマップ星, Eomappu Sei) that went scattered to eliminate Woola at the cost of their own well-being. She was discovered by Kana 7 years prior to the series and was given a place in E.G.I.S.. After her boss Kana was rescued from Gorothunder, Kirisaki attempts to harass her in order to spite Hiroyuki but switched plans by summoning Woola after probing through Pirika's mind. Fully aware of her mission, Pirika used the Villain Guild's brainwave controlling device (脳波コントロール装置, Nōha Kontorōru Sōchi) to digitize herself, only to discover the planet eater was only troubled by its own existence. Because of this, she instructed E.G.I.S. in an operation to satiate its hunger. Although seemingly killed in Woola's explosion, Taiga managed to salvage at least her memories and inspector Sakura contacted former residents of Planet Eomapp to provide a spare body for her, allowing Pirika to be restored and reunited with E.G.I.S..

In Ultraman Taiga The Movie, Pirika was infected by a virus during her undercover in the alien hideout. She was saved by Daichi Ozora, who lost his ability to unite with X.

Pirika Asahikawa is portrayed by Ayuri Yoshinaga (吉永 アユリ, Yoshinaga Ayuri), who replaces Momoka (桃果) from the same talent agency due to the latter's scheduling conflict.

=== Kana Sasaki ===
Kana Sasaki (佐々木 カナ, Sasaki Kana) is the 38-year-old president of E.G.I.S., whose previously worked as a police officer in External Affairs Division X (外事X課, Gaiji Ekkusu-ka). After her failure to protect a Cicada Girl from being delivered to a research lab from a murder case, Kana left her job to establish E.G.I.S. She puts up a rather playful facade but shows a serious attitude when handling an alien case and is observant of her workers. Additionally as a result from her past trauma, Kana becomes dedicated to help both human and aliens alike, going as far as to give the former Villain Guild aliens Homare, Magma and Merkind and the android Pirika a membership in E.G.I.S.. Alongside Homare, Kana was already aware of Hiroyuki's double life as the Tri-Squad but keeps it to herself until the final battle with Woola.

In Ultraman Taiga The Movie, Kana lead the E.G.I.S. members in an undercover operation within the Villain Guild's hideout. There, she found herself under allying with Gai Kurenai.

Kana Sasaki is portrayed by Chiharu Niiyama (新山 千春, Niiyama Chiharu).

=== Alien Magma ===
Saber Tyrant Alien Magma (サーベル暴君 マグマ星人, Sāberu Bōkun Maguma Seijin; 1, 24, 25, Movie) is a former member of Villain Guild who kidnapped the Baby Zandrias as a leverage to call its mother in a fight against their Zegun, forced to fall back when Zegun was killed by Hellberus. After Zolin's arrest and Woola's arrival, Magma and Merkind attempted to leave Earth but changed their mind after being inspired by Pirika's bravery, offering their assistance to E.G.I.S. in an operation to neutralize Woola. Magma rode his Magma Saucer (マグマ円盤, Maguma Enban) alongside Homare to launch a white hole missile, therefore allowing Taiga to free the monster from its own existence. As a result of their cooperation, both aliens were given membership in E.G.I.S. by Kana.

In Ultraman Taiga The Movie, Alien Magma was injured from E.G.I.S.'s fight with Dada's team of Villain Guild. He was absent during the New Generation Heroes' fight with Tregear, but assisted Homare off-camera to provide a map of the possessed-Taro's locations.

Alien Magma is voiced by Takaya Kuroda (黒田 崇矢, Kuroda Takaya), his species first appearing in episode 1 of Ultraman Leo.

=== Alien Merkind ===
Space Merchant Alien Merkind (宇宙商人 マーキンド星人, Uchū Shōnin Mākindo Seijin; 1, 2, 24, 25, Movie) is a former auctioneer of Villain Guild, responsible for selling the group's captured monsters to the highest bidders. Although not appeared, Merkind was responsible for purchasing the Monster Bomb Darebolic alongside the Alien Zetton "Zolin". At some point after Zolin's capture and Pirika's digitization into Woola's body, Merkind and Alien Magma offer their assistance, wherein the former took over Pirika's position as the analyzer of E.G.I.S.' attempt to satiate Woola. His involvement earned him a membership in E.G.I.S. by Kana at the end of the series, currently working as the team's accountant.

Merkind was present during the cold opening of Ultraman Taiga The Movie, but was absent during the New Generation Heroes' fight with Tregear.

Alien Merkind is voiced by Takehisa Hirose (廣瀬 武央, Hirose Takehisa), his species first appearing in episode 3 of Ultraseven X.

== Ultra Warriors ==
=== Tri-Squad ===
The Tri-Squad (トライスクワッド, Torai Sukuwaddo) is a trio of Ultramen with different origins who join forces to preserve peace in space. Initially thought to have killed by Tregear, their scattered lights wandered in outer space as they reunite on Earth bonding with the same host, Hiroyuki.

Hiroyuki transforms into either one of them through the Taiga Spark (タイガスパーク, Taiga Supāku), an item which was developed by Ultraman Taro and Tregear and was originally his Taro-let (タロウレット, Tarō-retto). The item functions by scanning Ultra Taiga Accessory (ウルトラタイガアクセサリー, Urutora Taiga Akusesarī), each with different results:

- Key Holder Type (キーホルダータイプ, Kī Horudā Taipu): Represents the Tri-Squad's transformations.
- Bracelet Type (ブレスレットタイプ, Buresuretto Taipu): Powers of past Ultra Warriors, specifically the New Generation Heroes. It functions by empowering the Tri-Squad's finishing techniques.
- Ring Type (指輪タイプ, Yubiwa Taipu): Also called as Monster Rings (怪獣リング, Kaijū Ringu), it was created from remains of defeated monsters. Its mainly used by Taiga to tap into the monster's own power, but was carefully planned by Tregear as a way of influencing him through slow corruption.

==== Ultraman Taiga ====
Ultraman Taiga (ウルトラマンタイガ, Urutoraman Taiga) is the eponymous Ultraman who is the son of Ultraman Taro and is also known as the "Hero of Light" (光の勇者, Hikari no Yūsha). Although the founder and leader of Tri-Squad, he yearns for his father's respect and grows to become a proper hero despite his youthful age, 4,800 years old. (Note: According to director Ryuichi Ichino, Taiga's age is comparable to a Japanese ninth to tenth grader student (15-16 years old).)

In his younger days, Taiga found solace in the blue Ultra named Filis and trains harder after being overshadowed by his father's popularity. During his journey in outer space, he join forces with Andro Ares in Planet Maiji to fight against Imbeeza's platoon of Gua Army. He would soon meet Titas and Fuma within their respective homeworlds, which resulted in the formation of Tri-Squad. Following his defeat by Tregear, Taiga's particles of light wandered in space-time continuum and bonded with Hiroyuki to save the boy from a great fall. As his body recuperated in the span of 12 years, Taiga reveal himself to save the Zandrias family from Hellberus while dedicating his life to save Earth from multiple threats. Taiga grew stronger with his own set of powers, but slowly fell into the corruption induced from prolonged use of the Monster Rings. He was rescued by Hiroyuki and eventually gains a new form, Tri-Strium, as a result. After the battle against Woola, Taiga offered Tregear a chance of redemption, but was rejected and forced to defeat him with Quattro Squad Blaster.

At some point later on, Taiga found himself facing against his corrupted father and dealt with a reckless Hiroyuki. Riku give the Ultra an advice of facing one's father, and that only their son that could save them.

Taiga's fighting skill is balanced and utilizes the same stance as his father. His finisher is Strium Blaster (ストリウムブラスター, Sutoriumu Burasutā). After being given the Plasma Zero-let (プラズマゼロレット, Purazuma Zero-retto) by Zero, Taiga and any of his forms can augment Zero's abilities to his own; Taiga Dynamite Shoot (タイガダイナマイトシュート, Taiga Dainamaito Shūto), Taiga Emerium Blaster (タイガエメリウムブラスター, Taiga Emeriumu Burasutā) and Wide Taiga Shot (ワイドタイガショット, Waido Taiga Shotto). Taiga would later gain access to other forms in the series progress:

- Photon-Earth (フォトンアース, Foton Āsu): Taiga's power-up form, which he obtained through Ai Tennoji's help. His personal Key Holder was upgraded into Photon-Earth Key Holder (フォトンアースキーホルダー, Foton Āsu Kī Horudā) as Hiroyuki scans it thrice and empowers the Ultra with the energy of the Earth and Sun. Declaring himself as the "Hero of the Land and Sky" (大地天空の勇者, Daichi Tenkū no Yūsha), his body color becomes predominantly black and dons a set of gold and silver armor. His finisher in this form is Aurum Strium (オーラムストリウム, Ōramu Sutoriumu).
- Tri-Strium (トライストリウム, Torai Sutoriumu): Taiga's strongest form also known as the "Hero of Bonds" (絆の勇者, Kizuna no Yūsha) when Hiroyuki accessed the Tri-Squad-let (トライスクワッドレット, Torai Sukuwaddo-retto), combining with the rest of the Tri-Squad members and his human host. Taiga obtains the sword named Taiga Tri Blade (タイガトライブレード, Taiga Torai Burēdo), allowing him to utilize enhanced versions of the Tri-Squad members' finishing moves or his independent attack, Tri-Strium Burst (トライストリウムバースト, Torai Sutoriumu Bāsuto).

Ultraman Taiga is voiced by Takuma Terashima (寺島 拓篤, Terashima Takuma).

==== Ultraman Titas ====
Ultraman Titas (ウルトラマンタイタス, Urutoraman Taitasu) is the 9,000-year-old "Wise Man of Power" (力の賢者, Chikara no Kenja) from Planet U40, the birthplace of Ultraman Joneus. Unlike the rest of his kind, Titas is actually the son to a pair of Heller's Soldiers as he was jettisoned to the Planet U40 by his father, who wanted his son to follow a different path. During the Ultra People's final stand against the Heller Empire, Titas was hesitant in initiating Ultra Change until the death of Matia triggered his first transformation and killed the monster Kishiadar. Titas met Taiga when the latter visited U40 and later on forms the Tri-Squad after Fuma joined them.

Following his defeat from Tregear, Titas' particles of light roamed in outer space and assisted the spirit of Nana Kujō to stop her vengeful husband from destroying Cozmo Technica. After fulfilling her wish and stopping Galactron MK2, Titas bonded with Hiroyuki as he reunited with Taiga.

With his carefully trained body and healthy spirit, Titas is skilled in heavyweight battles. Being an Ultra Person of U40, Titas bears a Star Symbol (スターシンボル, Sutā Shinboru) that he obtained by the Great Sage but operates normally like a Land of Light Ultra's Color Timer. His black coloration is said to be a remnant from his Anti-Ultra Humanoid origin. His finisher is Planium Buster (プラニウムバスター, Puraniumu Basutā). In the Voice Drama, Titas originally transformed with his race's Beam Flasher before he acquired his copy of Taiga Spark.

Ultraman Titas is voiced by Satoshi Hino (日野 聡, Hino Satoshi).

==== Ultraman Fuma ====
Ultraman Fuma (ウルトラマンフーマ, Urutoraman Fūma) is the 5,000-year-old "Champion of Wind" (風の覇者, Kaze no Hasha) from Planet O-50, the origin of Ultraman Orb, Ultraman Rosso and Ultraman Blu. Prior to the series, Fuma was originally a human-like son of a climber who gave up halfway to the Warrior's Peak of Planet O-50. He was born on said planet as his father was incapable of returning to his home world out of embarrassment. While making his living as a street child, the boy received tutelage under an alien named Gerg and the two since then took various odd jobs in hopes of being recognized by O-50's Ring of Light. After being injured by the Interstellar Alliance due to being tricked into fighting his mentor, Fuma was brought to the Warrior's Peak and becomes an Ultraman in order to save his life. He had since remain as an Ultraman to honor Gerg. Fuma would meet Taiga and Titas when his home world was under attack by alien forces and together, the three defend the Warrior's Peak and form the Tri-Squad.

After his seeming death from Tregear, Fuma's particles entered a jewelry which passed on to various users, with the recent owner being the Villain Guild itself. Volk stole it in hopes of selling it to support the impoverished alien children before Fuma escaped to fight Darebolic and rejoin the Tri-Squad.

He has a rough personality, but also a strong sense of duty. Fuma utilizes speed and agility during combat, as well as firing energy shuriken. His finisher is Polar Star Light Wave Shuriken (極星光波手裏剣, Kyokusei Kōha Shuriken), which is said to be taught by his alien instructor Gerg even before his transition into an Ultra.

Ultraman Fuma is voiced by Shōta Hayama (葉山 翔太, Hayama Shōta).

=== Ultraman Ribut ===
Ultraman Ribut (ウルトラマンリブット, Urutoraman Ributto) is an Ultraman from the Land of Light that previously debuted from the 2014 season of Malaysian animation Upin & Ipin, later on making his live debut in Ultra Galaxy Fight: New Generation Heroes. Aged 5,700 years old, he is a member of the peacekeeping organization Galaxy Rescue Force (ギャラクシーレスキューフォース, Gyarakushī Resukyū Fōsu) and dedicated to protect the life forms in outer space. After rescuing a Ragon in Planet Liquitor, Ribut fulfills Taro's request to rescue Rosso and Blu from Planet Penol but failed to apprehend an escaping Tregear before the evil Ultra sent his Red Kings as distractions.

In battle, Ribut utilizes the Asian martial art silat and has G-Crystals (Gクリスタル, Jī Kurisutaru) on each of his arms and legs, while his finisher is Galaxium Blaster (ギャラクシウムブラスター, Gyarakushiumu Burasutā). His weapons are the Ribut Blocker (リブットブロッカー, Ributto Burokkā) on his left forearm to utilize beam attacks and the Spreader Rod (スプレッダーロッド, Supureddā Roddo) Bō for melee combat.

Ultraman Ribut is voiced by Wataru Komada (駒田 航, Komada Wataru) in Japanese and Iain Gibb in English. His appearance is designed by Takeuchi (竹内), a young designer of Tsuburaya Productions.

=== Ultraman Reiga ===
Ultraman Reiga (ウルトラマンレイガ, Urutoraman Reiga) is an Ultra that debuted in Ultraman Taiga The Movie. He is a result of all New Generation Heroes combining with Hiroyuki into a new warrior.

To transform, Hiroyuki drags the New Generation Eye (ニュージェネレーションアイ, Nyū Jenerēshon Ai) to his face and press the activation button. As it contains all 11 New Generation Heroes, Reiga has the ability to fight on par with Grimdo. He retains the Tri-Squad's Taiga Spark, allowing him to execute Reiga Ultimate Blaster (レイガ・アルティメットブラスター, Reiga Arutimetto Burasutā) as his finishing move once Hiroyuki scans the New Generation-let (ニュージェネレーションレット, Nyū Jenerēshon-retto).

Ultraman Reiga is voiced by Takuma Terashima, who is also Taiga's voice actor.

=== Audio drama-exclusive characters ===
- Filis (フィリス, Firisu; 1, 2): A blue tribe member of the Land of Light Ultras, Filis works in the Space Science Technology Bureau as an archivist of past relics, including a particular weapon belonging to Mebius. He also served as a counselor to the young Taiga, who was furious from living under his father's shadow. He is voiced by Takehisa Hirose.
- Matia (マティア; 5-7): The son of U40 Fleet Commander Zamius (ザミアス, Zamiasu) and Titas' childhood friend. After a young Titas was adopted by Zamius for a reason, Matia and Titas grew up together as if they were brothers. In the final days of the Heller Empire, the two became separated from their team and joined Grigoreos' camp as they fought against the monster Kishiadar. Matia's death from the ensuing battle gave Titas the final push to initiate his first Ultra Change. He is voiced by Keito Matsumura (松村 圭人, Matsumura Keito).
- Grigoreos (グリゴレオス, Gurigoreosu; 6, 7): A U40 inhabitant and the captain of a division joined by young Titas and Matia, reprimanding the former for his refusal to transform. When Joneus, the Science Guard's Ultria and the U Fleet planned an attack from their planet's atmosphere, Grigoreos commanded his team to attack Kishiadar the next morning and died in the ensuing battle. He is voiced by Kanato Watarai (渡井 奏斗, Watarai Kanato).
- Andro Ares (アンドロアレス, Andoro Aresu; 13-15): An Andro Super Warrior that Taiga met during the Gua Army's attack on a remote planet known as Planet Maijii (惑星マイジー, Wakusei Maijī) when being a cadet of the Space Garrisons. In battle, he utilizes a pair of the Cosmo Magnum (コスモマグナム, Kosumo Magunamu) handguns as his weapons, which has Twin Edge Mode (ツインエッジモード, Tsuin Ejji Mōdo), a pair of daggers. His finishers using the Cosmo Magnums are Twin Edge Andro Cross Haze Slash (ツインエッジ アンドロ十文字霞斬り, Tsuin Ejji Andoro Jūmonji Kasumi Giri) and Cosmo Magnum Strike Burst (コスモマグナム ストライクバースト, Kosumo Magunamu Sutoraiku Bāsuto). He is also able to perform the Cosmo Aura (コスモオーラ, Kosumo Ōra) attack. He is voiced by Katsumi Fukuhara (福原 かつみ, Fukuhara Katsumi).
- Nix (ニックス, Nikkusu; 17, 19): A captain of a U40 space ship. While sending back the Science Guard to Earth after the war against the Heller Empire, he became friendly with Daisuke Gondō, the captain of the Science Guard who gave his favorite sunglasses as proof of the friendship to him. He is voiced by Tetsuo Kishi (岸 哲生, Kishi Tetsuo).
- Toki (トキ; SP3): The captain of the Planet Chrono Defense Force (惑星クロノ防衛軍, Wakusei Kurono Bōei-gun), known as the Koseidon Corps (コセイドン隊, Koseidon-tai), who pilots a Tyrannosaurus-like mecha known as Koseidon. He is voiced by Kanato Watarai and based on Go Toki from Dinosaur Corps Koseidon.
- Himugashi (ヒムガシ; SP3): The captain of the Koseidon Corps' air unit. The air unit members pilot pterosaur-like fighters known as Hakuas (ハクアス, Hakuasu). He is voiced by Takatora Shimada (島田 高虎, Shimada Takatora) and based on Tetsu Himugashi from Dinosaur Corps Koseidon.

=== Other Ultra Warriors ===
- Inter-Galactic Defense Force (宇宙警備隊, Uchū Keibitai): A peacekeeping organization in the Land of Light.
  - Ultra Brothers (ウルトラ兄弟, Urutora Kyōdai): A division of 11 Ultras, the six major members (Zoffy to Taro) force a teleportation to the Minato brothers (as Rosso and Blu no less) in the light of League of Darkness' assaults.
    - Ultraman (ウルトラマン, Urutoraman; UGF: NGH): See here.
    - Zoffy (ゾフィー, Zofī; UGF): The leader of Ultra Brothers and friends of Father Of Ultra and Mother Of Ultra.
    - Ultraseven (ウルトラセブン, Urutorasebun; UGF: NGH): See here.
    - Ultraman Jack (ウルトラマンジャック, Urutoraman Jakku; UGF: NGH): See here.
    - Ultraman Ace (ウルトラマンエース, Urutoraman Ēsu; UGF: NGH): Adoptive brother of Ultraman Taro.
    - Ultraman Taro (ウルトラマンタロウ, Urutoraman Tarō; 0, UGF: NGH, 1, 13, 16, Movie): For more information, see here.
    - Ultraman Mebius (ウルトラマンメビウス, Urutoraman Mebiusu): See here.
  - Ultraman Zero (ウルトラマンゼロ, Urutoraman Zero; UGF,: NGH 23): See here.
- New Generation Hero (ニュージェネレーションヒーロー, Nyū Jenerēshon Hīrō; UGF: NGH, 1, Movie): A team of post-2013 Ultra Warriors starting from Ultraman Ginga. The group was assembled by Taro in the wake of League of Darkness' campaign before pursuing Tregear. As they were incapacitated from the vile Ultra's minefield, Ginga lead his team members in donating their bracelets to the Tri-Squad in hopes that their juniors would carry on the battle. As revealed in Ultraman Taiga The Movie, the New Generation Heroes sacrificed their transformation abilities to seal Grimdo into a barrier. In order to regain them, the human hosts went to Earth and protect Hiroyuki from the Villain Guild assailants and reclaim their bracelets.
  - Ultraman Gingavictory (ウルトラマンギンガビクトリー, Urutoraman Gingabikutorī; UGF: NGH, Movie): The fusion of Ginga and Victory, formed by their respective component's resolve to fight under Zero's memory and was utilized to eliminate Etelgar and Dark Lugiel in the League of Darkness' Dark Palace.
    - Hikaru Raido (礼堂 ヒカル, Raidō Hikaru)/Ultraman Ginga (ウルトラマンギンガ, Urutoraman Ginga; UGF: NGH, 1, Movie): An Ultraman who came from future, Ginga rescued X and Geed from Dark Lugiel on Planet Sundowin before bringing them to the Land of Light. Hikaru/Ginga becomes the leader of the assembled New Generation Heroes to save Zero and Grigio from Planet Tenebris. Once provided with the power boost by other members, Ginga Strium performs New Generation Dynamite (ニュージェネレーションダイナマイト, Nyū Jenerēshon Dainamaito) to defeat Ultra Dark-Killer and destroying his Dark Palace. His powers were copied into the Ginga-let (ギンガレット, Ginga-retto), which allows Ultraman Fuma to perform Seven Star Light Wave Shuriken (七星光波手裏剣, Shichisei Kōha Shuriken). In Ultraman Taiga The Movie, Hikaru and Sho rescued Homare from Kirisaki's assault. His role is reprised by Takuya Negishi (根岸 拓哉, Negishi Takuya) and is the only past actor of the New Generation Hero to reprise his role in episode 1 of Taiga. In the English dub of Galaxy Fight, he is voiced by Peter von Gomm.
    - Sho (ショウ, Shō)/Ultraman Victory (ウルトラマンビクトリー, Urutoraman Bikutorī; UGF: NGH, 1, Movie): Ginga's partner from Victorian, Victory was sent to rescue Orb from O-50 when the League of Darkness try to steal his light energy. His powers were copied into the Victory-let (ビクトリーレット, Bikutorī-retto), which allows Ultraman Fuma to perform Trenchant-Star Light Wave Shuriken (鋭星光波手裏剣, Eisei Kōha Shuriken). His role is reprised by Kiyotaka Uji (宇治 清高, Uji Kiyotaka) and voiced by Michael Jose Rivas-Micoud in the English dub of Galaxy Fight.
  - Ultraman X (ウルトラマンエックス, Urutoraman Ekkusu; UGF: NGH, 1, Movie): When Dark-Killer terrorizes the outer space, X join forces with Geed to detain him, but his light energy was stolen for the creation of X Darkness, leaving him weakened on Planet Sundowin (惑星サンダウィン, Wakusei Sandauin) before Ginga bails him from Dark Lugiel. His powers were copied into the X-let (エックスレット, Ekkusu-retto), which allows Ultraman Titas to perform Electro Buster (エレクトロバスター, Erekutoro Basutā).
    - Daichi Ozora (大空 大地, Ōzora Daichi; Movie): Ultraman X's human host and a Xio officer. As a result of his X Devizer turned white, Daichi lost the ability to unite with X and saved an infected Pirika from the malwares. His role is reprised by Kensuke Takahashi (高橋 健介, Takahashi Kensuke). In the English dub of Galaxy Fight, Mark Stein voices him when conversing through X.
  - Gai Kurenai/Ultraman Orb (クレナイ・ガイ/ウルトラマンオーブ, Kurenai Gai/Urutoraman Ōbu; UGF: NGH, 1, Movie): During his return to Planet O-50, Orb was ambushed by X and Geed Darkness, who proceed to steal his light energy before Victory interrupts the process and bail them out to the Land of Light. His powers were copied into the Orb-let (オーブレット, Ōbu-retto), which allows Ultraman Taiga to perform Supreme Blaster (スプリームブラスター, Supurīmu Burasutā). During the events of Ultraman Taiga The Movie, Gai visited the Villain Guild hideout and rescued the E.G.I.S. leader Kana. His role is reprised by Hideo Ishiguro (石黒 英雄, Ishiguro Hideo) and voiced by Chris Wells in the English dub of Galaxy Fight.
  - Riku Asakura/Ultraman Geed (朝倉 リク/ウルトラマンジード, Asakura Riku/Urutoraman Jīdo; UGF: NGH, 1, Movie): Under demands from AIB, Geed was sent to arrest Dark-Killer for terrorizing the outer space where he join forces with Ultraman X. His light energy was stolen to create Ultraman Geed Darkness, leaving him weakened before Ginga bails them out from Dark Lugiel. His powers were copied into the Geed-let (ジードレット, Jīdo-retto), which allows Ultraman Titas to perform Wrecking Buster (レッキングバスター, Rekkingu Basutā). Geed's final battle with his father was referenced by Alien Godola and Zero in episode 23 when Mabuze brings the possibility to resurrect Belial as a clone. In Ultraman Taiga The Movie, Riku and the Minato brothers set up the Ginga Quattro Market (銀河クワトロマーケット, Ginga Kuwatoro Māketto) as a ploy to protect Hiroyuki from the Villain Guild. As he approach Hiroyuki, Riku advised Taiga of a son's fight with their father and assured of his role to save Taro. His role is reprised by Tatsuomi Hamada (濱田 龍臣, Hamada Tatsuomi) and voiced by Dario Toda in the English dub of Galaxy Fight.
  - Ultraman Gruebe (ウルトラマングルーブ, Urutoraman Gurūbu; UGF: NGH, Movie): The combination of the Minato siblings' Ultramen counterparts, utilized to stop the rampaging Dark-Killer. The formation of Ultraman Gruebe was deemed as a threat by Tregear, which resulted with Dark-Killer kidnapping Ultrawoman Grigio in Ultra Galaxy Fight, therefore setting the motion of the miniseries.
    - Ultrawoman Grigio (ウルトラウーマングリージョ, Urutoraūman Gurījo; UGF: NGH, Movie): The only female member of the group, Grigio becomes the sole protector of Ayaka City after her brothers studying abroad. While honing her skills on the countryside, Grigio and Zero fell victim to Dark-Killer's assault, setting up the motion of the miniseries. After Dark-Killer's defeat, Grigio was sent back to Earth in order to protect Ayaka City, thus being absent from the New Generation Heroes' pursuit of Tregear during the cold opening of Ultraman Taiga. Her voice role is reprised by Arisa Sonohara (其原 有沙, Sonohara Arisa) and provided by Rumiko Varnes in the English dub.
    - Ultraman Ruebe (ウルトラマンルーブ, Urutoraman Rūbu; UGF: NGH): The fusion of the older brother pair Rosso and Blu, formed after Grigio recharge their Color Timers. This fusion was utilized to fight the combined efforts of Zero Darkness and Dark Killer, killing the former with Ruebe Vortex Buster.
      - Katsumi Minato (湊 カツミ, Minato Katsumi)/Ultraman Rosso (ウルトラマンロッソ, Urutoraman Rosso; UGF: NGH, 1, Movie): Taking place after the end of R/B the Movie, Rosso was teleported from Milan by Taro. His and Blu's attempt to find Grigio lands them in a fight with Etelgar on Planet Penol until Ribut bails them out. His powers were copied into the Rosso-let (ロッソレット, Rosso-retto), which allows Ultraman Taiga to perform Flame Blaster (フレイムブラスター, Fureimu Burasutā). In Ultraman Taiga The Movie, Katsumi posed as a client of E.G.I.S. to lure them towards the Ginga Quattro Market, doing so to save Hiroyuki from being a target. His role is reprised by Yuya Hirata (平田 雄也, Hirata Yūya) and voiced by Jeff Manning in the English dub of Galaxy Fight.
      - Isami Minato (湊 イサミ, Minato Isami)/Ultraman Blu (ウルトラマンブル, Urutoraman Buru; UGF: NGH, 1, Movie): Likewise with Rosso, Blu was teleported from California to the Land of Light by Taro, joining forces with Rosso to save their sister Grigio. His powers were copied into the Blu-let (ブルレット, Buru-retto), which allows Ultraman Taiga to perform Aqua Blaster (アクアブラスター, Akua Burasutā). In Ultraman Taiga The Movie, Isami joined his brother in protecting Hiroyuki from the Villain Guild, wielding self-crafted weapons in likeness of their R/B Sluggers. His role is reprised by Ryosuke Koike (小池 亮介, Koike Ryōsuke) and voiced by Ryan Drees in the English dub of Ultra Galaxy Fight.
- Ultraman Joneus (ウルトラマンジョーニアス, Urutoraman Jōniasu): The Ultra Warrior from his starring series, he becomes an inspiration for Titas to study Earth's culture and greeted Taiga during his first arrival on U40.
- Unnamed Ultraman (10): An unnamed Ultraman was an opponent who defeated the Alien Nackle Odyssa in an unnamed alien planet. His silhouette bore an identical appearance to Ultraman Jack (hence his scene was based on episode 37 of Return of Ultraman), but their connection remains unknown.

== Antagonists ==
=== Ultraman Tregear ===
Ultraman Tregear (ウルトラマントレギア, Urutoraman Toregia) is the main antagonist of Ultraman Taiga, who menaced the Tri-Squad on recurring occasions and at the same time taking pleasures on others' misery. While blending in with society, Tregear took on the human alias Kirisaki (霧崎).

Originally an insecure Blue Tribe (ブルー族, Burū-zoku) member of the Ultra race from the Land of Light, Tregear became fast friends with Ultraman Taro, but their friendship grew apart when they went to separate career paths. Discovering the reason behind Belial's rebellion against his own people and his supervisor Hikari embarking on a vendetta against Bogarl, Tregear became disillusioned with the Land of Light's policy as a peacekeeper and went on a self-imposed exile. Eventually by absorbing Grimdo into himself, Tregear severed his Ultraman heritage and embraced the darkness, using his newfound powers to sow chaos in 7 universes. Tregear was also responsible for the events of Ultraman R/B taking place, as well as fighting the Minato siblings at one point.

Having initially assisted the League of Darkness from behind the scenes, Tregear faced off the New Generation Heroes by incapacitating them on an asteroid, then dispersing the Tri-Squad into light particles to be scattered onto Planet Earth. 12 years later, Tregear observed the Tri-Squad's reunion and clashed fists with them, but his true plan came to light as he was slowly corrupting Taiga into an evil Ultra. When Taiga managed to overcome the corruption with Hiroyuki and Tri-Squad's help, Tregear resorted to summon Woola to devour Earth. His attempt to sabotage Taiga and EGIS' operation backfired when his energy beam was used as a catalyst to feed Woola and ended the monster's life in a painless way. After rejecting a chance of redemption, Tregear allowed himself to be seemingly obliterated by Taiga Tri-Strium's Quattro Squad Blaster. Six months later, his previous defeat from Tri-Strium resulted with an accidental release of a fragment of Grimdo. The rest of Grimdo remained sealed within Tregear's body and the fallen Ultra used said monster to possess Taro on Earth, creating a conflict between both father and son in the midst of the New Generation Heroes' appearances. Taiga Tri-Strium successfully saved Taro by performing Ultra Dynamite, but Tregear allows himself to be consumed for Grimdo to restore its full power. After the ancient god's defeat by Reiga, Tregear was last seen whispering Taro's name as he died in the explosion.

Originally in his Early Style, Tregear is far weaker than an average Ultra, but makes it up with his high intellect, one of which resulted with the creation of the Taiga Spark that members of Tri-Squad came to use. After forming a pact with Grimdo, Tregear's body is partially wrapped with restraints and a cover on his Color Timer to keep the monster's seal intact. Grimdo's powers allow Tregear to endlessly operate without limitations and creating Trera Thyra (トレラ・スラー, Torera Surā) space portals to multiple dimensions. Aside from the finishing move Trera Ultigeyser (トレラアルティガイザー, Torera Arutigaizā)and corruption-inducing beam Ischyros Dynamis (イスキュロス・ダイナミス, Isukyurosu Dainamisu), he can cheat death from fatal attacks by having an alternate universe counterpart replacing his original body.

Ultraman Tregear is voiced by Yuma Uchida (内田 雄馬, Uchida Yūma). In the English dub of Ultra Galaxy Fight, he is voiced by Michael Rhys. As Kirisaki, he is portrayed by Kou Nanase (七瀬 公, Nanase Kō).

=== Villain Guild ===
The Villain Guild (ヴィラン・ギルド, Viran Girudo) is an alien criminal group that operate in a space saucer. Their modus operandi involves unleashing monster weapons into the city to sell them towards the highest bidder. Despite Zolin's arrest, the group is still at large, with another branch operated in the United States. In Ultraman Taiga The Movie, several of the group members attempt to target Hiroyuki to take the Taiga Spark from him and make a lot of money off of it while finding themselves opposed by past members of New Generation Heroes.

Members

- Space Phantom Cicadaman (宇宙怪人 セミ人間, Uchū Kaijin Semi Ningen; 1): One of the aliens who try to intercept E.G.I.S.' escort operation before being killed by Ckalutch's misfired attempt. First appeared in episode 16 of Ultra Q.
- Insect Alien Alien Ckalutch (昆虫宇宙人 クカラッチ星人, Konchū Uchūjin Kukaratchi Seijin; 1, Movie): First appeared in Ultraman Orb The Movie.
  - 1: Alongside Cicadaman, he tried to intercept E.G.I.S.' delivery of Baby Zandrias and was killed by Cicadaman's misfired attempt.
  - Movie: One of the aliens that are in the Villain Guild hideout, he was defeated alongside other members by Kana and Gai.
- Electric Wave Phantom Lecuum (電波怪人 レキューム人, Denpa Kaijin Rekyūmu-jin; 2, Movie): First appeared in episode 26 of Ultra Q: Dark Fantasy.
  - 2: An alien who kidnapped Chibisuke in the past while encountering the young Hiroyuki Kudo. In the present day, he and two other members of Villain Guild were responsible for manipulating King Guesra with a controller. When their operations were discovered by E.G.I.S., Lecuum managed to avoid Hiroyuki. He is voiced by Katsumi Fukuhara.
  - Movie: One of the aliens that try to target Hiroyuki in the Ginga Quattro Market, he was defeated alongside Hypnas and Pedan by Isami.
- Transforming Phantom Alien Zetton "Zolin" (変身怪人 ゼットン星人 ゾリン, Henshin Kaijin Zetton Seijin Zorin; 4, 20): A big name in the Villain Guild who assumes the human identity of Sōrin Seto (瀬戸 宗林, Seto Sōrin) and lives on Earth as a neighborhood association president and the head of Zolin Corporation (ゾリンコーポレーション, Zorin Kōporēshon), a shell corporation. He is later arrested by External Affairs Division X. He is portrayed by Shigeru Harihara (針原 滋, Harihara Shigeru), his species first appearing in episode 39 of Ultraman.
- Slaughter Alien Hypnas (殺戮宇宙人 ヒュプナス, Satsuriku Uchūjin Hyupunasu; 9, Movie): First appeared in episode 8 of Ultraseven X.
  - 9: One of the two aliens who try to steal Maiko's talisman before being killed by Majappa.
  - Movie: One of the aliens that try to target Hiroyuki in the Ginga Quattro Market, he was defeated alongside Lecuum and Pedan by Isami.
- Strategic Alien Alien Keel (戦略星人 キール星人, Senryaku Seijin Kīru Seijin; 9, Movie): First mentioned in episode 12 of Ultra Q but physically appeared in episode 6 of Ultra Galaxy Mega Monster Battle: Never Ending Odyssey.
  - 9: One of the two aliens who try to steal Maiko's talisman before being defeated by Homare. He is voiced by Gaku Kudo (工藤 雅久, Kudō Gaku).
  - Movie: One of the aliens that try to target Hiroyuki in the Ginga Quattro Market. Alongside Shaplay and Serpent, he fought Katsumi before being forced to fall back when Grimdo revived.
- Space Phantom Alien Pedan (宇宙怪人 ペダン星人, Uchū Kaijin Pedan Seijin; 4, 17, Movie): First appeared in episode 15 of Ultra Seven.
  - 4: An alien who got involved, along with Volk, in an alien gang conflict.
  - 17: One of the aliens who try to take back their monster induction device from Meed, who stole it from them. He ends up being defeated by Homare and arrested by External Affairs Division X. He is voiced by Akihiro Mine (峰 晃弘, Mine Akihiro).
  - Movie: One of the aliens that try to target Hiroyuki in the Ginga Quattro Market, he was defeated alongside Lecuum and Hypnas by Isami.
- Space Emperor Alien Bado (宇宙帝王 バド星人, Uchū Teiō Bado Seijin; 20, Movie): First appeared in episode 19 of Ultra Seven.
  - "El-Ray" (エル・レイ, Eru Rei; 20): An alien hitman who is hired by Zolin. He tries to assassinate Sachiko Motomiya but ends up being arrested along with two Villain Guild members by External Affairs Division X. He is voiced by Keita Tada (多田 啓太, Tada Keita).
  - Movie: One of the aliens that are in the Villain Guild hideout, he was defeated alongside other members by Kana and Gai.
- Three-Faced Phantom Dada (三面怪人 ダダ, Sanmen Kaijin Dada; Movie): A Dadaism-themed alien who leads a small group of thieves. He and other group members stole the blue stone of Baradhi. After Homare recovered the stolen stone, Dada unleashed and piloted Legionoid Dada Customize before being killed in the destruction of the robot. He is voiced by Toshiyuki Morikawa (森川 智之, Morikawa Toshiyuki), his species first appearing in episode 28 of Ultraman.
- Space Phantom Alien Zelan (宇宙怪人 ゼラン星人, Uchū Kaijin Zeran Seijin; Movie): One of the aliens that are in the Villain Guild hideout, he was defeated alongside other members by Kana and Gai. First appeared in episode 31 of Return of Ultraman.
- Dark Alien Alien Shaplay (暗黒星人 シャプレー星人, Ankoku Seijin Shapurē Seijin; Movie): One of the aliens that try to target Hiroyuki in the Ginga Quattro Market. Alongside Keel and Serpent, he fought Katsumi before being forced to fall back when Grimdo revived. First appeared in episode 20 of Ultra Seven.
- Possessing Alien Alien Serpent (憑依宇宙人 サーペント星人, Hyōi Uchūjin Sāpento Seijin; Movie): One of the aliens that try to target Hiroyuki in the Ginga Quattro Market. Alongside Keel and Shaplay, he fought Katsumi before being forced to fall back when Grimdo revived. First appeared in episode 39 of Ultraman Mebius.
- Alien Groza (グローザ星系人, Gurōza Seikeijin; Movie): A Villain Guild sniper who is one of the aliens that try to target Hiroyuki in the Ginga Quattro Market. He tried to shoot at Hiroyuki but was knocked out by Riku. He is a tribute to Grozam from episodes 43-46 of Ultraman Mebius.

Monsters

- Dimensional Demolition Lord Zegun (時空破壊神 ゼガン, Jikū Hakai-shin Zegan; 1): A living weapon that the Villain Guild stole for auction, arranging it to fight the Young Mother Zandrias to attract bidders until it was killed by Kirisaki's Hellberus. First appeared in episode 14 of Ultraman Geed.
- Young Sea Monster Chibisuke (幼海獣 チビスケ, Yō Kaijū Chibisuke; 2): A juvenile monster from the Guesra (ゲスラ, Gesura) species, first appearing in episode 6 of Ultraman. It was named by Hiroyuki, who fed it with chocolates until a Lecuum abducted it.
  - Sea Monster King Guesra (海獣 キングゲスラ, Kaijū Kingu Gesura; 2): Within the span of 12 years, Chibisuke was modified into a gigantic monster weapon by the Villain Guild, now named King Guesra. With a microchip implanted on its brain, it was guided by Lecuum's controller to attack cacao bean storage area to demonstrate its might for the Villain Guild's auction. Regardless of Kirisaki's attempt to provoke it, Hiroyuki and Taiga managed to bring Chibisuke to its senses until Tregear appeared fought both of them. Chibisuke was killed in an attempt to shield Taiga from Tregear's Trera Cheir Phos. First appeared in Superior Ultraman 8 Brothers.
- Monster Bomb Darebolic (MB) (怪獣爆弾 デアボリック(MB), Kaijū Bakudan Deaborikku (Emu Bī); 4): A gigantic monster weapon that Zolin bought at an auction. Volk and two other aliens try to use it to force the Japanese government into paying the ransom money in hopes of supporting the impoverished children until Zolin's assassin opened fire as Darebolic appeared from the Monster Bomb's detonation. Having incapacitated Taiga, Darebolic was no match for Fuma's speed and destroyed by Seven Stars Light Wave Shuriken. First appeared in Ultraman Orb the Movie
- Giant-Ant Terrible-Monster Aribunta (大蟻超獣 アリブンタ, Ōari Chojū Aribunta; 20): A gigantic monster weapon that was used to destroy related facilities of Eneclone Corporation (エネクロン社, Enekuron-sha) to manipulate the corporation's stock price. First appeared in episode 5 of Ultraman Ace.
- Imperial Machine Soldier Legionoid Dada Customize (帝国機兵 レギオノイド ダダ・カスタマイズ, Teikoku Kihei Regionoido Dada Kasutamaizu; Movie): Dada's giant robot, it was destroyed by Taiga's Taiga Dynamite Shoot, killing the alien as a result. First appeared in episode 18 of Ultraman Geed.

=== League of Darkness ===
The League of Darkness (暗黒軍団(ダークネス), Dākunesu) are the main antagonists of the prequel miniseries, Ultra Galaxy Fight: New Generations Heroes, an evil army consist of Ultra Dark-Killer, the revived of Dark Lugiel and Etelgar, and the Darkness Ultramen clones. Their main base of operation is the Dark Palace (ダーク宮殿, Dāku Kyūden) of the minus energy-infested Planet Tenebris (惑星テンネブリス, Wakusei Ten'neburisu).

Members

- Ultra Dark-Killer (ウルトラダークキラー, Urutora Dāku Kirā): A demon born from the grudges of past monsters fought by members of the Ultra Brothers. He was killed by Taro's Super Ultra Dynamite with the help of the Ultra Brothers. As he was revived, Dark-Killer resurrected Etelgar and Lugiel to his cause and threatened the safety of X, Geed, Zero and Grigio, forcing Taro to recruit the New Generation Heroes in his fight. Initially killed by Ultraman Ruebe, Tregear revived him into 200-meter-tall (660 ft) rampant that New Generation Heroes fight with their strongest forms/fusion. In a desperate bid to gain the advantage of the fight, he recreated and consume his Darkness Warriors as Ginga Strium delivers the finishing blow New Generation Dynamite, sealing his fate to be killed permanently. Dark-Killer is capable of creating a copy of an Ultra Warrior and the pocket dimension Dark-Killer Zone (ダークキラーゾーン, Dāku Kirā Zōn) to drain the energies of his captives. He is voiced by Kōichi Toshima (外島 孝一, Toshima Kōichi) in the Japanese dub and Eric Kelso in the English dub. First appeared in the pachinko game, Ultraman Taro: Fight! Ulra 6 Brothers.
- Darkness Warriors (ダークネス戦士, Dākunesu Senshi): By stealing the light energy of an Ultra Warrior, Dark-Killer fuses it with his Killer Plasma (キラープラズマ, Kirā Purazuma) to create their respective Darkness (ダークネス, Dākunesu) copies as part of the League of Darkness' combatants. The first to be created were X and Geed Darkness, who defeated their original templates in Planet Sundowin (惑星サンダウィン, Wakusei Sandawin) before absorbing Orb's light on Planet O-50 to create his counterpart on Tenebris. Once the New Generation Heroes storm the planet, the three copies proceed to fight their template while the last clone, Zero Darkness fend off against Ultraman Zero and Grigio. With the exception of Zero Darkness, all initial three copies were killed by their respective templates, wielding the power of Ultraman Zero. Dark-Killer recreates the quartet to consume them as an additional boost to empower himself before being killed by Ginga Strium. Koichi Sakamoto envisions the clones after the Ultra Dark-Killer Brothers from Ultraman Taro: Revenge of the Dark pachinko game.
  - Utraman X Darkness (ウルトラマンエックスダークネス, Urutoraman Ekkusu Dākunesu): A dark clone of Ultraman X's basic form, created with his stolen light energy fused to Dark-Killer's Killer Plasma. He was killed by Ultraman X Ultraman Zero Armor's Final Ultimate Zero. X Darkness demonstrated the same attacks as his template, such as the use of Xanadium Darkness Ray (ザナディウムダークネス光線, Zanadiumu Dākunesu Kōsen) and Attacker Darkness X (アタッカーダークネスＸ, Atakkā Dākunesu Ekkusu). By arming himself with the Darkness Gomora Armor (ダークネスゴモラアーマー, Dākunesu Gomora Āmā), he can utilize Darkness Gomora Oscillatory Wave (ダークネスゴモラ振動波, Dākunesu Gomora Shindō-ha).
  - Ultraman Geed Darkness (ウルトラマンジードダークネス, Urutoraman Jīdo Dākunesu): A dark clone of Ultraman Geed Primitive, created by fusing his stolen light with Dark-Killer's Killer Plasma. He was killed by Geed Magnificent's Big Bustaway. With identical color to the original's father, Belial, Geed Darkness can initiate Wrecking Darkness Burst (レッキングダークネスバースト, Rekkingu Dākunesu Bāsuto), Wrecking Darkness Ripper (レッキングダークネスリッパー, Rekkingu Dākunesu Rippā) and Wrecking Darkness Roar (レッキングダークネスロア, Rekkingu Dākunesu Roa).
  - Ultraman Orb Darkness (ウルトラマンオーブダークネス, Urutoraman Ōbu Dākunesu): A clone of Ultraman Orb Orb Origin, created by Dark-Killer through X Darkness and Geed Darkness stealing Orb's light. Although his process was incomplete due to Victory's interruption from the theft of Orb's light, Orb Darkness is still capable of fighting on equal terms with the original. He was killed by Orb Emerium Slugger's ES Spacium and Hyper Ultra Knock Tactic. He wields the antithesis of Orbcalibur, Darkness Calibur (ダークネスカリバー, Dākunesu Karibā), through which he could perform Darkness Supreme Calibur (ダークネススプリームカリバー, Dākunesu Supurīmu Karibā).
  - Ultraman Zero Darkness (ウルトラマンゼロダークネス, Urutoraman Zero Dākunesu): A clone of Ultraman Zero that Dark-Killer creates through his stolen light in the Dark-Killer Zone. His name and appearance is based on Zero's trauma of being possessed by Belial. Initially fighting against the intensely drained Zero and Grigio, Zero Darkness join his creator in fighting Ruebe before he was killed by Ruebe Vortex Buster. Tregear revived Zero Darkness for Zero Beyond to fight and killed by his Twin Giga Break. His main ability involves firing purple bullets and a red Wide Zero Shot.
- Darkness Demon Dark Lugiel (暗黒の魔神 ダークルギエル, Ankoku no Majin Dāku Rugieru): Ultraman Ginga's darker counterpart and the major antagonist of Ultraman Ginga. Alongside Etelgar, Dark Lugiel was revived to join the League of Darkness and failed to intercept X and Geed from escaping Planet Sundowin. He agreed to cooperate with the League under the terms of finishing Ginga with his own hands and was killed by Ultraman Gingavictory's Wide Zero Shot. His voice is reprised by Tomokazu Sugita (杉田 智和, Sugita Tomokazu) and provided by Guy Perryman in the English dub.
- Super Dimensional Demon Etelgar (超時空魔神 エタルガー, Chō Jikū Majin Etarugā): Revived alongside Dark Lugiel as part of League of Darkness, Etelgar was dispatched to intercept Rosso and Blu in Planet Penol (惑星ペノル, Wakusei Penoru) before Ribut enters the fray to bail the brothers out. Likewise, Etelgar agreed to assist the League under the terms of finishing Victory by himself and was killed alongside Lugiel by Ultraman Gingavictory's Wide Zero Shot. His voice is reprised by Tatsuhisa Suzuki (鈴木 達央, Suzuki Tatsuhisa) since Ultraman Ginga S The Movie and provided by Lyle Carr in the English dub. Alongside Dark Lugiel, Etelgar was chosen due to their connection with Ultraman Ginga.

=== Grimdo ===
Malicious Demonic Monster Grimdo (邪神魔獣 グリムド, Jashin Majū Gurimudo) is the final villain of Ultraman Taiga The Movie. Long ago, Grimdo existed as a primordial deity since the era of chaos and was sealed within Planet Borges (惑星ボルヘス, Wakusei Boruhesu) to maintain the balance of the universe. During Tregear's self-exile from the Land of Light, he freed Grimdo from its prison and form a pact by absorbing the monster into his body, with a set of restraints keeping its presence at bay. With Grimdo's nigh-omnipotent powers, Tregear strength surpassed even a Super Ultraman and is capable of using bodies of his alternate selves as backups to cheat death.

After his defeat by Ultraman Taiga Tri-Strium's Quattro Squad Blaster, the seal broke and a fragment of Grimdo was temporarily sealed through the New Generation Heroes after sacrificing their transformation powers. Six months later in Ultraman Taiga The Movie, Grimdo was unleashed from its seal and possessed Ultraman Taro during his attempt on using Ultra Dynamite, placing him under Tregear's control. When the Tri-Squad expelled Grimdo from Taro, Tregear allowed the ancient god to consumed him to restore its full power as it fought against and was defeated by Ultraman Reiga's Reiga Ultimate Blaster.

Grimdo's attacks are the Grim Howling (グリムハウリング, Gurimu Hauringu) shock wave, the Grim Bolt (グリムボルト, Gurimu Boruto) lightning bolts, and the Grim Ray (グリムレイ, Gurimu Rei). After it was unleashed from Tregear's restraints, Grimdo was only half of its original strength, as the other half remained in the fallen Ultra. To restore its full power, Tregear offered himself as a sacrifice in his desperate bid to kill Taro and the New Generation Heroes, as it grew large and has the ability to terraform Earth into a similar environment to Planet Volhes.

== Other characters ==
- Inspector Sakura (佐倉警部, Sakura-keibu; 2, 4, 20, 25): A police officer in External Affairs Division X, who occasionally requested E.G.I.S.'s help in solving alien-related cases. He is portrayed by Shingo Kazami (風見 しんご, Kazami Shingo).
- Nana Kujō (九条 ナナ, Kujō Nana; 3): The late wife of Rento, she was among the casualties of their space station's destruction. Her wish to stop Rento was heard by Titas as he brought her spirit on Earth to reunite with Rento. After thanking the Ultraman, the couple passes on to afterlife. She is portrayed by Misato Kawauchi (河内 美里, Kawauchi Misato).
- Hikaru Imazato (今里 光, Imazato Hikaru; 3): The self-centered president of Cozmo Technica (コズモテクニカ, Kozumo Tekunika), whose rocket accidentally destroyed a space station and killing its inhabitants. When Rento try to kill him in revenge, Imazato hired E.G.I.S. for protection. Following Galactron MK2's destruction, he was punched by Homare for his troubles while his massive payment was refused by Kana. He is portrayed by Yohei Ogawa (小川 陽平, Ogawa Yōhei).
- Ai Tennoji (天王寺 藍, Ten'nōji Ai; 7, 8): A denpa net idol who possesses the powers of a shaman, the former incarnation of her who sealed away Night Fang. Her inherited ability from her ancestor plays an important part in providing Taiga access to his new form, Photon-Earth. She is portrayed by Sora Kurumi (胡桃 そら, Kurumi Sora), who also portrays her former incarnation.
- Higo (肥後; 7): Ai's manager, who was impersonated by an Alien Babarue to lure Ai to Kuzuryu Village. He is portrayed by Masato Kawamorita (川守田 政人, Kawamorita Masato).
- Honoka Kanzaki (神崎 穂花, Kanzaki Honoka; 11): Kana's childhood friend who realized her childhood dream to open her own cake shop. She was attacked by Gymaira on her way back from E.G.I.S.' office. She is portrayed by Kaoru Ukawa (鵜川 薫, Ukawa Kaoru).
- Kanta (カンタ; 15): A boy who has a friendship with Moko. He is portrayed by Reo Masuda (増田 怜雄, Masuda Reo).
- Sachiko Motomiya (元宮 サチコ, Motomiya Sachiko; 20): (Note: Her given name is written in kanji as "紗智子".) The researcher of the faculty of engineering at Touto University who developed a device named CQ that can distinguish aliens from humans. She is targeted by the Villain Guild, who wants to prevent the development of CQ. She is portrayed by Natsuko Nagaike (永池 南津子, Nagaike Natsuko), while as a child, she is portrayed by Riko Yonemura (米村 莉子, Yonemura Riko).
- Osamu Tasaki (田崎 修, Tasaki Osamu; 21): A 19-year-old man who joins E.G.I.S. as a probationary member. He hates aliens because his mother got injured due to Zetton controlled by Alien Bat. He is portrayed by Masashi Azuma (東 将司, Azuma Masashi).
- Asuka Tasaki (田崎 明日香, Tasaki Asuka; 21): Osamu's currently-hospitalized mother. She is portrayed by Yumi Okuda (奥田 由美, Okuda Yumi).

== Monsters and aliens ==
=== Tregear-related ===
- Skull Monster Red King (どくろ怪獣 レッドキング, Dokuro Kaijū Reddo Kingu) and Skull Monster Red King II (どくろ怪獣 レッドキング 二代目, Dokuro Kaijū Reddo Kingu Nidaime) (UGF: NGH): A pair of Red Kings from different generations, they were summoned by Tregear to the magical space and fight against Ribut in his place. First appeared in episodes 8 and 25 of Ultraman respectively.
- Ultimate Disaster Monster Hellberus (最凶獣 ヘルべロス, Saikyō-jū Heruberosu; 1, 16, Movie): A space monster who gains reputation on outer space for its might, it was summoned by Tregear as the first opponent that Taiga faced in the present day, who destroy it with Supreme Blaster. It is armed with blade protrusions on its body, extendable tail and firing Hell Slash (ヘルスラッシュ, Heru Surasshu). It was reduced to Hellberus Ring (ヘルベロスリング, Heruberosu Ringu), which allows Taiga to initiate the monster's signature attack. Hellberus was revived from its Monster Ring by Kirisaki to aid Night Fang in defending a brainwashed Taiga, until it was reverted to its ring by Taiga Tri-Strium's Titas Burning Hammer. In Ultraman Taiga The Movie, after Tregear's confiscation of the Hellberus Ring, Hellberus was revived from its ring by him before being destroyed by Gingavictory's Ultra Fusion Shoot.
- Civil Judgementer Galactron MK2 (シビルジャッジメンター ギャラクトロンMK2, Shibiru Jajjimentā Gyarakutoron Māku Tsū; 3, 24): Originally a married astronaut named Rento Kujō (九条 レント, Kujō Rento) who was killed when his space satellite exploded upon collision with Cozmo Technica's rocket. He was revived by Tregear and return to Earth to kill the company's president Imazato. After hacking all satellites to fall on Earth, Rento uses an alien gun to transform into Galactron MK2 and almost killed Taiga until Titas quelled his anger by reuniting him with his late wife Nana as they passed on to afterlife. Leaving Galactron MK2 without a host, the robot was scrapped by Titas' Wrecking Buster and reduced to the Galactron Ring (ギャラクトロンリング, Gyarakutoron Ringu), which allows Taiga to initiate a copy of Galactron Gavert (ギャラクトロンゲベール, Gyarakutoron Gebēru) beam attack. Its ring was confiscated by Tregear after successfully brainwashing Taiga. Tregear revives Galactron MK2 as a bait for the recently arrived Woola and was consumed in the middle of its fight with Taiga. Rento Kujō is portrayed by Kenta Mishima (三嶋 健太, Mishima Kenta), whereas Galactron MK2 first appeared in Ultraman Geed the Movie.
- Volk (ヴォルク, Voruku; 4): A former Villain Guild member who was once given refuge by Homare while being on the run from a rival gang. Alongside a Serpent and Galmess, Volk was provoked by Tregear/Kirisaki to steal Zolin's Darebolic (MB) to get the ransom money from the government in hopes of helping the impoverished alien children. He was incapacitated by Zolin's agent and the crystal he stole reunited Fuma with the Tri-Squad. In his dying breath, Volk expressed his admiration in Homare and hoped the latter would continue helping the children before dying. He is portrayed by Ryo Tachibana (橘 りょう, Tachibana Ryō).
- Space Hitman Alien Gapiya "Abel" (宇宙ヒットマン ガピヤ星人 アベル, Uchū Hittoman Gapiya Seijin Aberu; 6): The younger brother of Sadis from Ultraman Orb The Movie who became a hitman cyborg that worked in-between dimensions and was hired by Tregear to kill the Tri-Squad. Encountering a lone Perolynga that wanted to go home, Abel was about to shoot him and Kana for being his witnesses but faced against the Tri-Squad and defeated by Fuma's Trenchant-Star Light Wave Shuriken. Because of his admiration to Sadis, Abel willingly receive his cybernetic to follow his brother's footstep and appeared seemingly identical, save for his blue color and red eyes. Retaining the same type of weapons, Adel's finisher is Fantastic Abelfiction (ファンタスティック・アベルフィクション, Fantasutikku Aberufikushon). He is voiced by Shunichi Maki (真木 駿一, Maki Shun'ichi).
- Poison Flame Monster Segmeger (毒炎怪獣 セグメゲル, Dokuen Kaijū Segumegeru; 5, Movie): The Seger race's monster, whose body is a natural producer of poison and can exhale the venomous fire Seger Flame (セゲルフレイム, Segeru Fureimu) from its mouth. Segmeger rampaged on various planets under its master to expand the Seger's influence before it arrived on Earth by Aoi's command. After its defeat by Taiga, Segmeger was revived by Aoi after her cover was blown but her death turned the tides of the battle. It was destroyed by Titas' Electro Buster and reduced to the Segmeger Ring (セグメゲルリング, Segumegeru Ringu), allowing Taiga to initiate the monster's Seger Flame. Its ring was confiscated by Tregear after successfully brainwashing Taiga. In Ultraman Taiga The Movie, Segmeger was revived from its ring by Tregear before being destroyed by Orb Trinity's Trinitium Light Ring.
- Nightmare Monster Night Fang (悪夢魔獣 ナイトファング, Akumu Majū Naito Fangu; 7, 8, 16, Movie): A space monster that was sealed away in a rocky mountain in the abandoned Kuzuryu Village (九頭流村, Kuzuryū-mura) by a shaman long ago. In the present day, it was released by an Alien Babarue by forcing Ai to undo the seal and the monster escaped after a short scuffle with Taiga. In the city, it unleashes Fang Wave (ファングウェイブ, Fangu Ueibu) to induce the citizens in their nightmares and absorb their fears. Pirika was able to neutralize the wave as Taiga fought the monster and uses Aurum Strium to finish it. What remains of Night Fang was reduced to Night Fang Ring (ナイトファングリング, Naito Fangu Ringu), which was salvaged by Taiga himself to initiate its Fang Wave attack. At some point later on, Night Fang was revived to assist Hellberus in defending a brainwashed Taiga from the Tri-Squad until it was reverted to Night Fang Ring by Taiga Tri-Strium. In Ultraman Taiga The Movie, after Tregear's confiscation of the Night Fang Ring, Night Fang was revived from its ring by him before being destroyed by Geed Ultimate Final's Crescent Final Geed.
- Assassin Alien Alien Nackle "Odyssa" (暗殺宇宙人 ナックル星人 オデッサ, Ansatsu Uchūjin Nakkuru Seijin Odessa; 10): A retired, proud warrior who assumes the human identity of Oda (小田). He lives a peaceful life on Earth after being defeated by an Ultra Warrior on a planet about 50 years ago. He is portrayed by Tamotsu Ishibashi (石橋 保, Ishibashi Tamotsu), who was previously the actor of Eisuke Wakura from Ultraman Nexus. His Alien Nackle suit was modeled after the original Nackle from episode 37 of Return of Ultraman.
- Bodyguard Monster Black King (用心棒怪獣 ブラックキング, Yōjinbō Kaijū Burakku Kingu; 10): Odyssa's monster. First appeared in episode 37 of Return of Ultraman.
- Vampire Monster Gymaira (吸血怪獣 ギマイラ, Kyūketsu Kaijū Gimaira; 11, 12): A monster that uses its tentacle-like split tongue to consume the energy that fills the universe. First appeared in episode 17 of Ultraman 80.
- Planetary Guardian Deity Gigadelos (惑星守護神 ギガデロス, Wakusei Shugoshin Gigaderosu; 14, Movie): A robot that is brought on Earth by Tregear. A long time ago, all Gigadelos were created by Ilt to protect several aliens and their respective planets against monster attacks, but fought each other and ruined many planets because Tregear input his consciousness into them. One model made its way to Earth under Tregear's orders in order to further descend Taiga into darkness by using the Night Fang Ring to counter its cloning ability, Delos Illusion (デロスイリュージョン, Derosu Iryūjyon). It was destroyed by Taiga Photon-Earth's Aurum Strium and was reduced to Gigadelos Ring (ギガデロスリング, Gigaderosu Ringu), allowing him to perform the robot's own signature cloning attack. Its ring was confiscated by Tregear after successfully brainwashing Taiga. In Ultraman Taiga The Movie, the Gigadelos was revived from its ring by Tregear before being destroyed by Exceed X Beta Spark Armor's Beta Spark Arrow.
- High Dimensional Being "Ilt" (高次元人 イルト, Kōjigen-jin Iruto; 14): An alien scientist and the creator of Gigadelos who travels the universe to retrieve his out-of-control robots. On Earth, he kidnaps Hiroyuki and stole the Tri-Squad's Key Holders out of fear for someone to bear enormous power. After a brief fight with Kirisaki, Ilt realized too late of the latter's true intention and shuts down the Gigadelos, allowing Taiga to destroy it. In aftermath, Ilt departs to outer space to shut down several more of Gigadelos. He is portrayed by Ire Shiozaki (汐崎 アイル, Shiozaki Airu).
- Alien Semon "Meed" (セモン星人 ミード, Semon Seijin Mīdo; 17): An alien swindler and thief who was caught by Kana four times when she was a police officer in External Affairs Division X. He is targeted by the Villain Guild because he said some of their secrets before being released from prison. After stealing the criminal group's monster induction device from Alien Pedan, he tries to resell it for money. He sacrifices himself to save Kana from Tregear while being arrested by External Affairs Division X. He is portrayed by Sento Takemori (竹森 千人, Takemori Sento).
- Molten Iron Monster Demaaga (熔鉄怪獣 デマーガ, Yōtetsu Kaijū Demāga; 17): A monster that emerges on the ground due to the Villain Guild's monster induction device activated by Tregear. It fought against and was killed by Taiga Tri Strium's Taiga Blast Attack. First appeared in episode 1 of Ultraman X.
- Antenna Alien Alien Bat (触覚宇宙人 バット星人, Shokkaku Uchūjin Batto Seijin; 18): An alien who assumes the human identity of Seiji Komori (小森 セイジ, Komori Seiji), and one of the aliens that seek to overthrow human society in order to rule Earth and create a society suitable for aliens. He is portrayed by Masanori Mimoto (三元 雅芸, Mimoto Masanori), his species first appearing in episode 51 of Return of Ultraman.
- Space Dinosaur Zetton (宇宙恐竜 ゼットン, Uchū Kyōryū Zetton; 18): A monster that Tregear gave Alien Bat. First appeared in episode 39 of Ultraman.
- Thunderstroke Monster Gorothunder (雷撃獣神 ゴロサンダー, Raigeki Jūshin Gorosandā; 19, Movie): A warlike space monster that is based on the Raijin, who gained his reputation for being the fiercest being on outer space. He was summoned to Earth by Tregear and turn him into the Gorothunder Ring (ゴロサンダーリング, Gorosandā Ringu) before he was deployed to kidnap Kana in his bellybutton. After his defeat, Taiga salvages the Gorothunder Ring. In Ultraman Taiga The Movie, after Tregear's confiscation of the Gorothunder Ring, Gorothunder was revived from its ring by him before being destroyed by Gruebe's Gruebing Ray. In battle, he wields the Goron Club (ゴロン棒, Goron-bō). He can unleash the Goro Tatsumaki (ゴロタツマキ) tornado energy from his gauntlet and generate electricity to shoot Thunder Spark (サンダースパーク, Sandā Supāku) by drumming the tomoe symbols on his chest. He is voiced by Takanori Tsujimoto (辻本 貴則, Tsujimoto Takanori), one of the directors of the series.
- Specter Phantom Alien Ghose (幽霊怪人 ゴース星人, Yūrei Kaijin Gōsu Seijin; 21): An ally of Alien Bat, Alien Ghose came to Earth, bringing along his pet monster Pandon. As means of communication, his race needs to borrow the body of a human or alien to speak human language. Despite being assaulted by the xenophobic Tasaki and Pandon running amok out of grief for its master, Alien Ghose managed to end both conflict peacefully. However, his spacecraft's drilling missile was utilized by Kirisaki to launch a homing beacon that attracted a meteorite from outer space to Earth. His species first appearing in episode 48 of Ultra Seven.
- Twin-Headed Monster Pandon (双頭怪獣 パンドン, Sōtō Kaijū Pandon; 21): Alien Ghose's monster, Pandon surfaced and fought Taiga after its master was assaulted by Tasaki. Although Ghose managed to put out the fight, Pandon was killed by Tregear. First appeared in episode 48 of Ultra Seven.
- Space Devouring Monster Woola (宇宙爆蝕怪獣 ウーラー, Uchū Bakushoku Kaijū Ūrā; 24, 25): The final monster in the series, a pseudo-life form with a black hole within its stomach, an all-consuming monster that came into being born from numerous trash deposits from various alien civilizations. Attracted by energy sources, Woola destroys worlds by eating its way to a planet's core. When Tregear learned of Woola's existence from probing Pirika's mind, he uses Alien Ghose's drill missile to unleash a plast of Earth's energy to outer space as a beacon signal for Woola. Once arriving on Earth, it feeds upon the recently revived Galactron MK2 and emerged victorious in its fight against Taiga Tri-Strium. When Pirika attempted to shut down Woola's life force, she discovered that the monster was simply in agony of its own cursed existence and continuous absorption of negative energies. This leads to a cooperation between E.G.I.S. and former Villain Guild members Magma and Merkind to neutralize said black hole with a white hole. Once the deed was done, Taiga used Zero's power to push Tregear's own energy for the monster to feed on before exploding, causing the previously consumed energies to return to their sources.

=== Others ===
- Primordial Amphibian Ragon (海底原人 ラゴン, Kaitei Genjin Ragon; UGF): A lone native of Planet Liquitor (惑星リクエター, Wakusei Rikuetā), he was hunted by a Peguila before Ribut destroyed the monster. First appeared in episode 21 of Ultra Q.
- Freezing Monster Peguila (冷凍怪獣 ペギラ, Reitō Kaijū Pegira; UGF): A monster in Planet Liquitor, whose capable of cryokinesis. While threatening a lone Ragon, Peguila was defeated by Ultraman Ribut as his first kill in the miniseries. First appeared in episode 5 of Ultra Q.
- Kawazu (河津; 1): A biologist of the alien race known as the Alien Rivers (リヴァーズ星人, Rivāzu Seijin). He hired the help from E.G.I.S. to escort him and the Baby Zandrias safely until Alien Magma stole it from him after he terminate his deal with the team. With Taiga rescuing the Baby Zandrias from Hellberus, Kawazu provided explanation of the Ultra to E.G.I.S. members before he parted ways. He is portrayed by Shiro Ishizaka (石坂 史朗, Ishizaka Shirō).
- Zandrias (ザンドリアス, Zandoriasu; 1): A monster species that went endangered due to being easy targets of predators at a young age. First appeared in episode 4 of Ultraman 80.
  - Chick Monster Baby Zandrias (雛怪獣 ベビーザンドリアス, Hina Kaijū Bebī Zandoriasu; 1): An infant Kawazu try to protect before Magma kidnaps it as leverage to lure Young Mother Zandrias.
  - Young Parent Monster Young Mother Zandrias (若親怪獣 ヤングマザーザンドリアス, Wakaoya Kaijū Yangu Mazā Zandoriasu; 1): The mother of Baby Zandrias, whose status is due to her motherhood at an early age. While her child was taken by Magma, Young Mother Zandrias was subjected to Zegun's assaults for the Villain Guild to find their highest bidder. When Hellberus appears, the maternal monster defend its child and Hiroyuki before Taiga rescued the family. With the whole ordeal ended, the family departs to outer space.
- Gluttonous Alien Alien Fanton (健啖宇宙人 ファントン星人, Kentan Uchūjin Fanton Seijin; 4, Movie): An information broker in the disguise of a hippie, Homare paid the information for Darebolic with his favorite yogurt. He is portrayed by Makoto Takahashi (高橋 麻琴, Takahashi Makoto), his species first appearing in episode 7 of Ultraman Mebius.
- Possessing Alien Alien Serpent (4, 19): A race of aliens. First appeared in episode 39 of Ultraman Mebius.
  - 4: An ally of Volk.
  - 19: An alien who was heavily questioned by Hiroyuki about Kirisaki. He is portrayed by Hayaki Kudō (工藤 隼己, Kudō Hayaki) in his human form and voiced by Hayato Kimura (木村 隼人, Kimura Hayato).
- Galmess (ガルメス人, Garumesu-jin; 4, 25): First appeared in Ultraman Orb The Movie.
  - 4: An ally of Volk.
  - 25: An alien who lives on Earth.
- Slaughter Alien Hypnas (4): One of the three alien gang members who fought with Homare. First appeared in episode 8 of Ultraseven X.
- Alien Damara (ダマーラ星人, Damāra Seijin; 5): An alien whose homeworld was destroyed by Segmeger. Having survived the assault, he went to E.G.I.S. and relay the information while requesting their help to stop Alien Seger. He is portrayed by Isamu Kurihashi (栗橋 勇, Kurihashi Isamu).
- Summoner Aoi (召喚士 葵, Shōkanshi Aoi; 5): A monster summoner of the alien race known as the Alien Seger (セゲル星人, Segeru Seijin), so long that she remained alive, Segmeger can return from its destruction. While roaming in a shopping mall, Aoi encountered Pirika and became fast friends but was forced to reveal her true colors after that. Taking Pirika's words to heart, Aoi sacrificed herself by turning into an antidote to heal Titas. She is portrayed by Rion Tanimoto (谷本 琳音, Tanimoto Rion).
- Bereaved Alien Cicada Girl (星人遺族 セミ少女, Seijin Izoku Semi Shōjo; 6): An alien whose parents were murdered by an unidentified murderer 10 years ago. Kana's regret of not being able to save her led to the foundation of E.G.I.S.. She is portrayed by Moemi Arai (新井 萌心, Arai Moemi).
- Psyche Alien Alien Perolynga (サイケ宇宙人 ペロリンガ星人, Saike Uchūjin Peroringa Seijin; 6): A race of aliens that went to Earth once in 50 years. One unnamed member try to fetch his little brother home but was forced to return alone after the latter becomes captivated by Earth. First appeared in episode 45 of Ultra Seven.
  - Man Who Wants to Return to the Star (星に帰りたい男, Hoshi ni Kaeritai Otoko; 6): A homesick Perolynga who was left behind on Earth for about 50 years after his human companion refused to join him in his space travel. In the present day, he encountered Abel in order to return to his home planet but was saved by Kana. As he continued from being chased by Abel and witnessed the Tri-Squad's battle, Kana's words changed his mind about returning home and eventually decided to stay on Earth for another period. His human form is reprised by Hiroyuki Takano (高野 浩幸, Takano Hiroyuki).
- Dark Alien Alien Babarue (暗黒星人 ババルウ星人, Ankoku Seijin Babarū Seijin; 7): An alien who disguised himself as Ai's manager, Higo, to use her powers to unseal Night Fang. He was killed by Fuma's Trenchant-Star Light Wave Shuriken while distracting the Ultra long enough for Night Fang to return. Likewise with the original Higo, he is voiced by Masato Kawamorita. His species first appearing in episode 38 of Ultraman Leo.
- Collective Alien Alien Huk (集団宇宙人 フック星人, Shūdan Uchūjin Fukku Seijin; 7, 18): A race of aliens. First appeared in episode 47 of Ultra Seven.
  - 7: An ally of Alien Babarue.
  - 18: An ally of Alien Bat.
- Aquatic Hazardous Monster Majappa (水異怪獣 マジャッパ, Suii Kaijū Majappa; 9): A monster that was sealed away in a small bottle by Maiko's ancestor on a planet. Its sealed form was passed over to Maiko's ancestors for generations until she became its current inheritor, leading to a feud with the Villain Guild until its accidental release. It was killed by Taiga Photon-Earth's Aurum Strium. According to director Masayoshi Takesue, Majappa is the original variant of Maga-Jappa from Ultraman Orb.
- Maiko Namekata (行方 マイコ, Namekata Maiko; 9): Homare's childhood friend who is a descendant of the alien clan that is responsible for sealing away Majappa. She is portrayed by Miho Izumikawa (泉川 実穂, Izumikawa Miho).
- Maria (麻璃亜; 11, 12): An alien who uses her magic wand to cast magic spells. Her homeworld, known as Planet Sarasa (惑星サラサ, Wakusei Sarasa), was collapsed by a mysterious lifeform that consumed the life energies of the planet's people. She is portrayed by Ryoka Oshima (大島 涼花, Ōshima Ryōka).
- Space Phantom Alien Zelan "Oshoro" (宇宙怪人 ゼラン星人 オショロ, Uchū Kaijin Zeran Seijin Oshoro; 11, 12): An alien who targets Maria's magical power to control Gymaira. After narrowly escaping Pagos' rampage, he was knocked out by Tregear, who proceed to heal Gymaira in a cave. He is portrayed by Taketo Kubota (久保田 武人, Kubota Taketo), his species first appearing in episode 31 of Return of Ultraman.
- Underground Monster Pagos (地底怪獣 パゴス, Chitei Kaijū Pagosu; 11, 12): A monster that arises from its sleep due to Gymaira rampaging underground and emerges on the ground. After its demise by Fuma, Pagos petrify itself and bits of its corpse were salvaged by the cleaning workers on the day after that. First appeared in episode 18 of Ultra Q, Pagos' suit was a newly made version in the same way as Neronga from Ultraman R/B.
- Brain Alien Alien Chibull "Mabuze" (頭脳星人 チブル星人 マブゼ, Zunō Seijin Chiburu Seijin Mabuze; 15): An alien mad scientist who experimented with various creatures to create the ultimate life form. He bought Ultraman Belial's B Factor at the Villain Guild's auction and use it to create Skull Gomora. At some point later on, Mabuze approached a trio of aliens who wanted to eliminate Taiga and Tregear by offering his service to create Imit-Ultraman Belial. Mabuze and the three aliens were killed after the Belial clone accidentally crashed their building when the latter intended to attack Tregear. He is voiced by Takahiro Mizushima (水島 大宙, Mizushima Takahiro) and his race first appeared in episode 9 of Ultra Seven.
- Mabuze's captives (15): As part of his experiments, Mabuze captures small creatures for his own experiments and place them within cages. When Skull Gomora begins to attack, Hiroyuki freed the creatures before the laboratory's own destruction.
  - Marine Animal Samekujira (海獣 サメクジラ, Kaijū Samekujira): A juvenile Samekujira that first appeared in episode 9 of Ultraman X.
  - Lim Eleking (リムエレキング, Rimu Erekingu): The diminutive form of an adult Eleking. First appeared in Ultraman Mebius as a Maquette Monster copy of the original monster.
  - Smuggled Monster Vadata (密輸怪獣 バデータ, Mitsuyu Kaijū Badēta): A juvenile Vadata, first appeared in episode 50 of Ultraman Cosmos.
  - Strange Beast Dethmon (奇獣 デスモン, Kijū Desumon): First appeared in episode 38 of Ultraman Tiga.
  - Space Insect Alien Galo (宇宙昆虫 ガロ星人, Uchū Konchū Garo Seijin): First appeared in Heisei Ultraseven.
  - Suction Monster Purana (吸引怪獣 プラーナ, Kyūin Kaijū Purāna): First appeared in episode 9 of Neo Ultra Q.
- Cultivated Synthetic Monster Skull Gomora (培養合成獣 スカルゴモラ, Baiyō Gōsei-jū Sukaru Gomora; 15): A recreation of the original Belial Fusion Monster from episode 1 of Ultraman Geed. It was created by Alien Chibull "Mabuze" from the DNA factors of Gomora, Red King and Ultraman Belial that he purchased from the Villain Guild and proceed to rampage in the nearby town. Under the corruption of the Monster Rings, Taiga delivers a merciless kill to Skull Gomora and destroying it with Aurum Strium.
- Little Peculiar Creature Lunah (小珍獣 ルナー, Shō Chinjū Runā; 15): A space lifeform known as Moko (モコ) that has a friendship with Kanta. First appeared in episode 5 of Ultraman Geed.
- Marionette Warrior Chiburoid (傀儡戦士 チブロイド, Kugutsu Senshi Chiburoido; 15): (Note: Also called as Marionette Phantom (傀儡怪人, Kugutsu Kaijin).) Mabuze's android troops. First appeared in episode 1 of Ultraman Ginga S.
- Insect Alien Alien Ckalutch (17): An alien who comes to Earth to buy the Villain Guild's monster induction device from Meed. After the deal goes wrong, he tries to kill Meed but ends up being defeated by Kana and arrested by External Affairs Division X. He is voiced by Takatora Shimada, his species first appearing in Ultraman Orb The Movie.
- Transforming Phantom Alien Pitt (変身怪人 ピット星人, Henshin Kaijin Pitto Seijin; 18, 25): First appeared in episode 3 of Ultra Seven.
  - 18: An alien who assumes the human identity of Hitomi Mizuno (水野 ヒトミ, Mizuno Hitomi) and lives with Alien Bat. She is portrayed by Seiko Iwaido (岩井堂 聖子, Iwaidō Seiko).
  - 25: An alien who lives on Earth. She is voiced by Sayaka Sasaki (佐咲 紗花, Sasaki Sayaka).
- Space Monster Bemular (宇宙怪獣 ベムラー, Uchū Kaijū Bemurā; 18): A monster that is controlled by Alien Huk. It was killed by Titas' Astro Beam after fighting the Tri-Squad members. First appeared in episode 1 of Ultraman.
- Mystie (ミスティ, Misuti; 20): External Affairs Division X's undercover agent in the Villain Guild who is an Alien Haze (ヘイズ星人, Heizu Seijin) who was Sachiko Motomiya's friend named Michirō (未知郎) when the two were children. After the completion of the task, he leaves Japan to investigate the Villain Guild in USA. He is portrayed by Keisuke Homan (穂満 佳佑, Homan Keisuke), while as a child, he is portrayed by Shūga Murakami (村上 秋峨, Murakami Shūga).
- Oil Monster Takkong (オイル怪獣 タッコング, Oiru Kaijū Takkongu; 22): An octopoda monster with sticky suction cups and feeds on petroleum oil. As the incarnation of the sea, Takkong previously sealed Giestron but turned weak due to its old age. Having previously defeated the Tri-Squad, Takkong join forces with Taiga Tri-Strium to defeat Giestron. In aftermath of the battle, Takkong leaves with Shinji to return to the ocean. First appeared in episode 1 of Return of Ultraman, Takkong's entire scene is a tribute to its debut in the aforementioned series.
- Ferocious Monster Giestron (凶猛怪獣 ギーストロン, Kyōmō Kaijū Gīsutoron; 22): A monster that represents the Earth's anger, due to land pollution caused by humans. Giestron was previously sealed by Takkong in the ancient times, but resurfaces to continue its deed. Giestron was defeated by the combined efforts of Taiga Tri-Strium and Takkong. It is a variant of Arstron from episode 1 of Return of Ultraman, and first appeared in the Ultraman Festival 2019.
- Shinji (シンジ; 22): A mysterious boy who appears in front of Hiroyuki and predicts the emergence of Giestron. His true form is a boy with octopus tentacles for hands, he sought the Tri-Squad's assistance to support Takkong in defeating Giestron. In aftermath of the fight, Shinji bids farewell to Hiroyuki and leaves with Takkong for the ocean. He is portrayed by Ayumu Yokoyama (横山 歩, Yokoyama Ayumu). He is based on Shinichi, the Nonmalt messenger from episode 42 of Ultra Seven.
- High-Speed Alien Alien Sran (高速宇宙人 スラン星人, Kōsoku Uchūjin Suran Seijin; 23): An ally of Mabuze. He is voiced by Kōki Hisada (久田 康樹, Hisada Kōki), his species first appearing in episode 4 of Ultraman Max.
- Vicious Alien Alien Zarab (凶悪宇宙人 ザラブ星人, Kyōaku Uchūjin Zarabu Seijin; 23): An ally of Mabuze. He is voiced by Jun Fukazawa (深澤 純, Fukuzawa Jun), his species first appearing in episode 18 of Ultraman.
- Anti-Gravity Alien Alien Godola (反重力宇宙人 ゴドラ星人, Han Jūryoku Uchūjin Godora Seijin; 23): An ally of Mabuze. He is voiced by Tatsuya Tōjō (東條 達也, Tōjō Tatsuya), his species first appearing in episode 4 of Ultra Seven.
- Imit-Ultraman Belial (ニセウルトラマンベリアル, Nise Urutoraman Beriaru; 23): A clone of the late Ultraman Belial that was created by Mabuze after offering his service to a trio of aliens. The result was a mindless clone with yellowish claws and crest, whose sole purpose of existence was to destroy everything in its path. Imit-Belial fought against the Tri-Squad and Tregear per his creator's orders, but finds himself joining forces with the fallen Ultra when Ultraman Zero assisted Taiga in the fight. He was killed by Taiga Tri-Strium's Taiga Dynamite Shoot when Tregear used him as a meat shield. Aside from fighting on the same strength as the original, Imit-Belial is capable of unleashing lightning bolts, Death Light Ring (デス光輪, Desu Kōrin) and Death-lash (デスラッシュ, Desurasshu) from his claws. His finishing move is a replication of Belial's Deathcium Beam.

=== Audio drama-exclusives ===
- Synthetic Monster Kishiadar (合成獣 キシアダー, Gōsei-jū Kishiadā; 7): The Heller Army's monster. It killed the division members, including Matia and Grigoreos, before being destroyed by Titas.
- Gerg (ゲルグ, Gerugu; 9-11): An alien who wants to go to the Warrior's Peak to obtain the power of light. His race are four-armed amphibians who lived in an entirely aquatic planet that was destroyed from a civil war. As he taught the young Fuma of self defense and running an odd job together, Gerg returned to the Warrior's Peak as a monster that terrorized the climbers, forcing the Interstellar Alliance to trick Fuma into fighting each other and striking both of them at once. In order to save Fuma, Gerg climbs to the peak and wished the Ring of Light to save Fuma, to which it complied by turning his student into an Ultraman. What happened to Gerg afterwards was unknown, but Fuma remains in his Ultraman form as a token of respect to his teacher. He is voiced by Kōhei Chiba (千葉 航平, Chiba Kōhei).
- Gua Army (グア軍団, Gua Gundan; 13-15): An evil empire led by the emperor Gua from the Andro Melos multimedia series.
  - Imbeeza (イムビーザ, Imubīza; 13-15): The Battle Captain of the Gua Army's Outer Universe Invasion Mechanized Squad who possesses the Cosmonium Claw (コスモニウムクロー, Kosumoniumu Kurō) on his right arm. When losing his right arm in his fight with Andro Ares, Imbeeza ran away before Pestoria killed him for his failure to invade Planet Maiji. He is voiced by Takatora Shimada.
  - Mecha Birdon (メカバードン, Meka Bādon; 13): Imbeeza's modified monster and a member of the Gua Army, based on Birdon from episode 18 of Ultraman Taro. It was easily destroyed along with Re-Brocken by Andro Ares.
  - Re-Brocken (改造ブロッケン, Kaizō Burokken; 13): Imbeeza's modified Terrible-Monster and a member of the Gua Army, based on Brocken from episode 6 of Ultraman Ace. It was easily destroyed along with Mecha Birdon by Andro Ares.
  - Fighting Bem Zabiden (ファイティング・ベム ザビデン, Faitingu Bemu Zabiden; 14): Imbeeza's Fighting Bem and a member of the Gua Army. He was easily destroyed by Andro Ares. First appeared in episode 25 of Andro Melos.
  - Fighting Bem Dakumiran (ファイティング・ベム ダクミラン, Faitingu Bemu Dakumiran; 14): Imbeeza's Fighting Bem and a member of the Gua Army. He was easily destroyed by Andro Ares. First appeared in episode 2 of Andro Melos.
  - Fighting Bem Bazelia (ファイティング・ベム バゼリア, Faitingu Bemu Bazeria; 14): Imbeeza's Fighting Bem and a member of the Gua Army. He was easily destroyed by Andro Ares. First appeared in episode 9 of Andro Melos.
  - Re-Zaragas (改造ザラガス, Kaizō Zaragasu; 14): Imbeeza's modified monster and a member of the Gua Army, armed with autocannons across its entire body and based on Zaragas from episode 36 of Ultraman. It was easily destroyed along with Alien Iros and Beakon by Andro Ares.
  - Re-Alien Iros (改造アイロス星人, Kaizō Airosu Seijin; 14): Imbeeza's modified alien and a member of the Gua Army, implanted with a missile launcher and based on Alien Iros from episode 13 of Ultra Seven. He was easily destroyed along with Zaragas and Beakon by Andro Ares.
  - Re-Beakon (改造ビーコン, Kaizō Bīkon; 14): Imbeeza's modified monster and a member of the Gua Army, used as a laser turret and based on Beakon from episode 21 of Return of Ultraman. It was easily destroyed along with Zaragas and Alien Iros by Andro Ares.
  - Re-Muruchi (改造ムルチ, Kaizō Muruchi; 14): Imbeeza's modified monster and a member of the Gua Army, based on Muruchi from episode 33 of Return of Ultraman. It stopped when Taiga punched a hole through its body.
  - Monster Battleship Pestoria (怪獣戦艦 ペストリア, Kaijū Senkan Pesutoria; 15): A gigantic mecha modeled after Oil Monster Pestar (油獣 ペスター, Yujū Pesutā) from episode 13 of Ultraman. It has the Black Hole Cannon (ブラックホール砲, Burakku Hōru Hō) built in its mouth.
- Ausar XIII (アウサル13世, Ausaru Jū-san-sei; 17-19): The young king of Planet G (惑星ジー, Wakusei Jī), which has diplomatic relations with Planet U40. He was possessed by Paraidar on Planet Sorkin while traveling through the universe. He is voiced by Kōichi Toshima.
- Nephthy (ネフティ, Nefuti; 17-19): The younger sister of Ausar XIII who requested Titas to kill her brother, who became a different person after returning from traveling. She later piloted Dairaoh to defeat Paraidar. She is voiced by Ayaka Nanase (七瀬 彩夏, Nanase Ayaka).
- Parasite Paraidar (寄生生命体 パライダー, Kisei Seimeitai Paraidā; 18, 19): An energy organism and spirit parasite-type Sorkin Monster (ソーキン・モンスター, Sōkin Monsutā) who possessed Ausar XIII on Planet Sorkin. He ascended the throne after killing the king and expanded armaments production for the invasion of other planets. When the possession of Ausar XIII by Paraidar was exposed by Titas, the monster left the young king before fighting the Ultraman. He possessed a huge pyramid and turned it into the form of a giant to crush Titas, but became impossible to leave the stone body due to a molecular anchoring beam from Nix's space ship. After his right arm was destroyed by Titas, ironically, he was finished off by Dairaoh. He is voiced by You Murakami (村上 陽, Murakami Yō).
- Mobile Royal Soldier Dairaoh (機動王兵 ダイラオー, Kidō Ōhei Dairaō; 19): A giant humanoid robot customized for Ausar XIII that was created by order of Paraidar as the young king.
- Iriya (イリヤ; 21, 22): A sickly alien little girl. Her race is a plant alien, resembling human with green skin and a flower bud on her head. She was brought by Fuma to visit the outer space but discovers that her race emits hazardous aroma should they visited extraterrestrial planets. She is voiced by Ayaka Nanase.
- Wald (バルト, Baruto; 21, 22): Iriya's father, he has a blue flower on his head. He is voiced by Takatora Shimada.
- Alien Gazariya "Darugen" (ガザリヤ星人 ダルゲン, Gazariya Seijin Darugen; SP1): A dinosaur trainer who modifies and trains dinosaurs inhabiting planets to use them for invasion purposes. On Planet Dino (惑星ディノ, Wakusei Dino), after Death Rex's destruction, Darugen rode on Duran's back and fought the Tri-Squad before dying as a result of the pterosaur's destruction. His species first appeared in Dinosaur War Izenborg.
- Death Rex (デスレックス, Desu Rekkusu; SP1): Darugen's modified dinosaur and the first enemy that the Tri-Squad fought. It was destroyed by Titas.
- Frilled Pterosaur Duran (襟巻翼竜 ドゥーラン, Erimaki Yokuryū Dūran; SP1): Darugen's modified pterosaur. It was destroyed by Taiga.
- Hornworm-like monster (SP2): A species of space monsters that consume plants to mature into their imago form. The monsters swarming over on Planet Rashua (惑星ラシュア, Wakusei Rashua) were destroyed by the Tri-Squad.
- Battleship Galmus (戦艦 ガルムス, Senkan Garumusu; SP3): The Alien Godmes (ゴドメス星人, Godomesu Seijin)' space station-type gigantic space battleship which carries disk-shaped fighters. The 20 invading battleships deployed around Planet Chrono were destroyed by the Tri-Squad and the Koseidon Corps. First appeared in Dinosaur Corps Koseidon.

=== Novel-exclusives ===
- Gagoze (ガゴゼ): A pair of monsters native to the Planet Tika-Du (惑星ティカ=ドゥ, Wakusei Tika=Du), they are originally leeches born from the leftover of Tika-Du's primordial soup and assimilated with various organisms (including cave bats and crabs) to create their current form. During young Taro and Tregear's exploration to said planet, the two encountered the monsters and were targets of assimilation. Taro managed to destroy both of them using Strium Beam and Ultra Dynamite before Tregear could be assimilated.
- Snark (スナーク, Sunāku): A creature created by Tregear in Planet Tutuola (惑星チュツオラ, Wakusei Chutsuora) using a pool of primordial soup. It was made under the image of Namegon from Ultra Q and was meant to be Tregear's companion during his self-exile from the Land of Light, but when Snark grew bigger and began consuming nearby cities, Tregear was forced to kill it by devolving his creation into a withering flower.
- Space Witch Thief Murnau (宇宙魔女賊 ムルナウ, Uchū Majo Zoku Murunau): The main antagonist of Ultraman Orb The Movie, Murnau was the first person Tregear encountered after his fusion with Grimdo. Originally a frail and old thief in her final years in Planet Cobol, Tregear provided her with eternal youth and crystallization powers, setting forth the motion of her movie appearance.
- Cosmo Eater Leugocyte (コスモイーター ルーゴサイト, Kosumo Ītā Rūgosaito): A space white blood cell tasked in cleansing the universe from its potential dangers. Tregear rewrote its genetic information to consume planets unconditionally and setting forth the events of Ultraman R/B.
- Void Monster Greeza (虚空怪獣 グリーザ, Kokū Kaijū Gurīza; 15): A void monster that Tregear encountered in a passing, it is also the final villain of Ultraman X.
- Alien Pegassa "Pega" (ぺガッサ星人 ぺガ, Pegassa Seijin Pega): Riku/Geed's alien companion from Ultraman Geed. Tregear orchestrated the events of Ultraman R/B The Movie by kidnapping Pega shoved him into Gan-Q as a hostage situation, hoping to get Riku fall into the darkness in the same way as Belial.
