= Dinosaur War Izenborg =

Japanese anime television series

- Dinosaur Great War Izenborg
- Vol. 8 DVD cover

恐竜大戦争アイゼンボーグ (Kyōryū Daisensō Aizenbōgu)
- Genre: Tokusatsu; Science fiction Superhero; Kyodai Hero; Anime
- Anime television series
- Directed by: Kanji Otsuka
- Produced by: Takao Niimi; Hiroshi Ishikawa (TV Tokyo); Tadashi Matsushima (Tokyu Agency); Akira Tsuburaya; Junkichi Oki (Tsuburaya Productions)
- Written by: Keiichi Abe
- Music by: Toshiaki Tsushima
- Studio: Tsuburaya Productions (live action); Oka Studios (animation)
- Original network: TV Tokyo
- Original run: 7 October 1977 – 30 June 1978
- Episodes: 39

Dinosaur War Izenborg (恐竜大戦争アイゼンボーグ, Kyōryū Daisensō Aizenbōgu) is a Japanese television program produced by Tsuburaya Productions. It is the second installment of the Tsuburaya Dinosaur Trilogy, which included Dinosaur Expedition Born Free and Dinosaur Corps Koseidon. It aired on TV Tokyo from October 7, 1977, to June 30, 1978, running for 39 episodes. It combined Tsuburaya's tokusatsu techniques with anime.

The first four episodes were released to VHS in the United States in the form of a compilation film titled Attack of the Super Monsters.

Comedy podcast RiffTrax (Michael J. Nelson, Bill Corbett and Kevin Murphy) recorded and released a riff of Attack of the Super Monsters in 2019.

== Premise ==
In 2000, it has been discovered that there are dinosaurs residing in a vast underground environment with the majority of these species having evolved an intelligence on par with the human race.

They are led by a tyrannosaurus named Ururu (known as Emperor Tyrannus in the English dub) who plans to eradicate humanity and reinstate dinosaurs as the dominant life-forms on Earth by using his powers to brainwash his subjects into destructive monsters that obey his every command, sending them out on to the surface world to wreak havoc on human civilization. The special ops unit D-Force is founded to combat the monstrous dinosaurs with specialized combat vehicles and cybernetic implants given to its members.

== The Return of Izenborg ==
The Return of Izenborg (帰ってきたアイゼンボーグ, Kaettekita Aizenbōgu) is a Japanese-Arabic documentary produced as a collaboration between the Japanese company Tsuburaya Productions, Mr. Jarrah Alfurih from Saudi Arabia and Cultures Factory (an NLC company). It is the first Arabic-Japanese production in the art of Japanese tokusatsu, which is a special live action effects category. This documentary was filmed in 2016 and aired on Friday 15 December 2017 on the Arabic block program on Spacetoon and Space Power at 8:30 p.m. local Saudi time. The documentary was translated back to Japanese by Tsubaraya and officially streamed on YouTube on 29 December 2017.
