= List of Ultraman R/B characters =

This is the character page for the 2018 tokusatsu Ultra Series Ultraman R/B.

== Minato family ==
=== Katsumi Minato ===
Katsumi Minato (湊 カツミ, Minato Katsumi), (Note: His given name is written in kanji as "活海".) born on May 23, 1995, is the 23-year-old eldest son who puts family importance above all else, evidenced by his decision to leave his childhood dream of becoming a baseball player and helps his father's business. Despite his critical thinking ability, he is also hot-blooded and incapable of observing his surroundings when playing baseball with other townspeople. He works as a clerk in his father's specialty shop and has a keen fashion sense. On the day of their mother's birthday, Katsumi and Isami were given the R/B Gyro (ルーブジャイロ, Rūbu Jairo) to transform into Ultraman Rosso and Blu after Grigio Bone's attack on Mt. Ayaka. Initially hesitant, he begins to accept the responsibility of an Ultraman it held and defend Ayaka City from monster attacks.

A year later after Leugocyte's defeat, Katsumi becomes torn in choosing what to do for his future. After getting into an argument with his former high school friend Yukio, Tregear tricked him into being left on Hoster 21 System until the Minato family rescued him as he rejoin the battle. Once returning Yukio to normal, Katsumi handed his former friend his baseball and leaves for Milan to further his study as a fashion designer.

Should both brothers hold the R/B Gyro, they can perceive each other's sense of vision. As Ultraman Rosso, Katsumi adopted his skill as a pitcher through said Ultra's attacks.

Katsumi Minato is portrayed by Yuya Hirata (平田 雄也, Hirata Yūya). As a child, Katsumi is portrayed by Hajime Fujisawa (藤沢 元, Fujisawa Hajime).

=== Isami Minato ===
Isami Minato (湊 イサミ, Minato Isami), (Note: His given name is written in kanji as "勇海".) born on April 13, 1999, is a 19-year-old college student studying cosmoarchaeology in honor of his long lost mother. He holds a huge respect to Katsumi for giving up his passion for sports to support their family. A free-spirited youth, Isami prefers to conduct interesting research instead of helping out at the store. Because of his clumsy attitude, he is incapable of expressing his gratitude to others. Alongside Katsumi, he obtained the R/B Gyro during their mother's birthday to transform into Ultraman Blu. Compared to Katsumi, Isami was more open-minded with his newfound powers but finds himself guided by his brother during the fight.

In Ultraman R/B the Movie, the Minato brothers stumbled upon a dimensional-displaced Riku, as Isami teamed up with him when Katsumi became stranded in an alien planet. After the fight with Tregear ended, Isami decided to further his study in California.

In addition to R/B Gyro, Isami also created a device that can detect presence of a monster.

Isami Minato is portrayed by Ryosuke Koike (小池 亮介, Koike Ryōsuke). As a child, Isami is portrayed by Kiara Minegishi (嶺岸 煌桜, Minegishi Kiara).

=== Asahi Minato ===
Asahi Minato (湊 アサヒ, Minato Asahi), (Note: Her given name is written in kanji as "朝陽".) born on March 3, 2001, is the 17-year-old youngest of the Minato siblings, a happy-go-lucky high school girl that is close to her brothers. She has a dislike of conflicts, which extends to the point of refusing to play rock–paper–scissors. On behalf of their mother, she performs the housework. She discovered her brothers' double life as Ultramen and her wish allows the Orb Ring NEO to assist them in defeating Horoboros, and even played a pivotal role on helping her brothers unlock the power of Ultraman Ruebe. Although the Minato family remember Asahi as a baby, the lack of past photos that represent her brings Ushio to doubt her existence. After her closest friend, Saki Mitsurugi sacrifice herself against Leugocyte's beam, she then inherits Saki's Gyro. During the final battle with Leugocyte, she is revealed to be the incarnation of Crystal and creates the Makoto Crystal through the power of the three siblings' bonds.

In Ultraman R/B the Movie, Asahi join forces with her brothers and a dimensional-displaced Ultraman in fighting against Ultraman Tregear's invasion. With Saki's Gyro, she assumed the form of Grigio Regina until Saki's spirit resonated with her, giving birth to Ultrawoman Grigio. After her brothers leave to travel the world, Asahi remains in Ayaka City to protect it for her brothers.

Asahi Minato is portrayed by Arisa Sonohara (其原 有沙, Sonohara Arisa). As a baby, Asahi is portrayed by Nanami Okada (岡田 菜々美, Okada Nanami).

=== Ushio Minato ===
Ushio Minato (湊 ウシオ, Minato Ushio), (Note: His given name is written in kanji as "潮".) born on May 14, 1968, is a 50-year-old kind father of the Minato family and owner of specialty store Quattro M (クワトロM, Kuwatoro Emu). As he lacks awareness of his sons being Ultramen, Ushio mistook his sons' behavior as teenage rebellion. His dream is to design clothes of his brand, "UshioMinato" and had provide financial support to his wife for her research. He refused to believe his wife had disappeared and faithfully waited for her return, with his wish granted at some point before Leugocyte's arrival to Earth.

Ushio Minato is portrayed by Ginnojo Yamazaki (山崎 銀之丞, Yamazaki Gin'nojō).

=== Mio Minato ===
Mio Minato (湊 ミオ, Minato Mio), born on July 1, 1968, is the 50-year-old (physically in her mid-30s) matriarch of Minato family who went missing near Mt. Ayaka on her birthday, fifteen years ago. She was a researcher contracted under Aizentech, who funded her past studies with her husband's clothing business. Mio was revealed to have been stranded on an alternate dimension for 15 years while stealing the Gyros after an encounter with Saki Mitsurugi. Due to the time spend in that pocket dimension, Mio physically remains in her mid-30s appearance until she escaped.

There, she learned of her sons becoming Ultra Warriors and receive the prediction of their impending death. Upon her return to Ayaka City, Mio stole the Gyros and prepare to contain Leugocyte in a Monster Crystal in hopes of banishing the monster into said pocket dimension, but her plan fell through due to Saki's intervention. This leads to her trying to use Aizentech tower's black hole generator to banish the monster and herself until her sons destroy the monster as Ultraman Ruebe. With peace returned to Ayaka City, Mio becomes the acting president of Aizentech in Aizen and Saki's absence.

Mio Minato is portrayed by Kaori Manabe (眞鍋 かをり, Manabe Kaori).

== Aizentech ==
Aizentech (アイゼンテック, Aizentekku) is a large company that focuses on space exploration and unknown energy research. The company is located on Ayaka City (綾香市, Ayaka-shi), the same area which the Minato family's Quattro M operates. In the past, Aizentech was originally a small factory named Aizen Iron Works (愛染鉄工, Aizen Tekkō) operated by Makoto's father before he moved it to Ayaka City and provide major contribution to the city, therefore making it as a company town. In the height of frequent monster attacks sent by Chereza, Aizentech had developed an Anti-Monster Restraint System (対怪獣拘束システム, Tai kaijū Kōsoku Shisutemu) that render its target in suspended animation. Unfortunately as a result of Saki's actions in ordering Grigio King to be released, the company faced a major crisis due to the declining rate of public trust.

=== Makoto Aizen ===
Makoto Aizen (愛染 マコト, Aizen Makoto) (Note: His given name is written in kanji as "誠".) is the 33-year-old president of Aizentech and a general manager of research. Behind his huge popularity in Ayaka City, Makoto is actually used a host body for Chereza to infiltrate human society 15 years prior to the events of the series and used a medium by the alien to transform into Grigio Bone and Ultraman Orb Dark. After Saki expels Chereza from his body, Makoto names her the new president of Aizentech as he steps down to travel around the world with his bicycle.

Makoto Aizen is portrayed by Motoki Fukami (深水 元基, Fukami Motoki).

=== D.R.L.N. ===
D.R.L.N. (ダーリン, Dārin; Digital Response Language Network) is an artificial intelligence that assisted Makoto (Chereza) in his works, such as archiving his poets and performs internal functions of the Aizentech headquarters. While operating outside, she inhabits a white drone to salvage Monster Crystals. Although faithfully serves Chereza, D.R.L.N.'s loyalty is fickle, as she sided with Saki in her plan to detonate Earth and later on shifted to Mio when she returned from another dimension.

As a result of Saki's declaration in bombing Earth in hopes of destroying Leugocyte, D.R.L.N. was hacked by an unknown source to assassinate Saki by controlling Chereza's King Joe unit and put Asahi in a hostage crisis but Saki briefly collaborated with the Minato brothers to save Asahi as Isami purified D.R.L.N. by shutting down the network connection and rebooted her.

D.R.L.N. is voiced by Kaede Yuasa (湯浅 かえで, Yuasa Kaede), who previously voiced Zandrias in Kaiju Girls.

== Ultramen ==
The titular Ultras of Ultraman R/B, Rosso and Blu, were originally humanoid orphans from Planet Sanja who were chosen into their self-titled Ultraman forms through the Light of Orb from Planet O-50 (オーフィフティ, Ō Fifuti), Ultraman Orb's home world. The brothers were killed after an attempt at preventing Leugocyte from destroying Earth, leaving behind their R/B Gyros for the Minato brothers to inherit their Ultramen identities while their youngest sister, Grigio, went on to adopt the alias of Saki Mitsurugi and continuing their mission to destroy Leugocyte at the cost of Planet Earth.

=== Ultraman Rosso ===
Ultraman Rosso (ウルトラマンロッソ, Urutoraman Rosso) is a twin-horned Ultraman who bonds with Katsumi Minato in the present day. He excels in mid and long range combat as he wields a pair of R/B Slugger Rosso (ルーブスラッガーロッソ, Rūbu Suraggā Rosso), with the left blade being shorter and held on a reverse grip. Since Katsumi is an aspiring baseball player, his skills as a pitcher are sometimes translated into Rosso's fighting stances.

Through Katsumi's use of the R/B Gyro and R/B Crystals, Rosso can perform a Type Change (タイプチェンジ, Taipu Chenji) to use different elemental powers:

- Flame: Rosso's default form accessed via the Taro Crystal, which allows him to convert his energy into fire-based attacks. In this form, he is capable of throwing small fireball projectiles. Although a balanced form, Rosso can exert strength and durability. His finisher is the Flame Sphere Shoot (フレイムスフィアシュート, Fureimu Sufia Shūto).
- Aqua: Rosso's first speed-oriented form accessed via the Ginga Crystal, which allows him to convert his energy into water-based attacks. In this form, he is capable of creating a liquid-like reflective barrier. His finisher is the Splash Bomb (スプラッシュボム, Supurasshu Bomu).
- Wind: Rosso's second speed form accessed via the Tiga Crystal, which allows him to convert his energy into air-based attacks. In this form, he is capable of both launching miniature cyclones and creating air bubbles. His finisher is the Hurricane Bullet (ハリケーンバレット, Harikēn Baretto).
- Ground: Rosso's strength-oriented form accessed via the Victory Crystal, which allows him to convert his energy into Earth-based attacks. In this form, he is capable of summoning a gravity well to trap his opponent. His finisher is the Ground Explosion (グランドエクスプロージョン, Gurando Ekusupurōjon).

Ultraman Rosso is voiced by Yuya Hirata, the actor of Katsumi Minato. Hirata also portrayed Rosso's human form in the penultimate episode of Ultraman R/B.

=== Ultraman Blu ===
Ultraman Blu (ウルトラマンブル, Urutoraman Buru) is a single-horned Ultraman who bonded with Isami to protect him from Grigio Bone's attack. In contrast to his older brother Rosso, Blu excels in mid and close range combat as he wields a single-bladed R/B Slugger Blu (ルーブスラッガーブル, Rūbu Suraggā Buru).

Through Isami's use of the R/B Gyro and R/B Crystals, Blu can perform a Type Change to use different elemental powers:

- Aqua: Blu's default form accessed via the Ginga Crystal, which allows him to convert his energy into water-based attacks. In this form, he is capable of both firing a concentrated stream of water and healing a wounded Ultra. Although a balanced form, Blu can exert speed and agility. His finisher is the Aqua Stream (アクアストリューム, Akua Sutoryūmu).
- Flame: Blu's first strength-oriented form accessed via the Taro Crystal, which allows him to convert his energy into fire-based attacks. In this form, he is capable of launching a barrage of flame bullets. His finisher is the Flame Equilix (フレイムエクリクス, Fureimu Ekurikusu).
- Wind: Blu's speed form accessed via the Tiga Crystal, which allows him to convert his energy into air-based attacks. In this form, he is capable of increasing his flight speed for aerial combat. However, it tends to wear Blu out quickly. His finisher is the Storm Shooting (ストームシューティング, Sutōmu Shūtingu).
- Ground: Blu's second strength-oriented form accessed via the Victory Crystal, which allows him to convert his energy into Earth-based attacks. In this form, he is capable of firing an energy stream of pebbles. His finisher is the Earth Bringer (アースブリンガー, Āsu Buringā).

Ultraman Blu is voiced by Ryosuke Koike, the actor of Isami Minato. Koike also portrayed Blu's human form in the penultimate episode of Ultraman R/B.

=== Ultraman Ruebe ===
Ultraman Ruebe (ウルトラマンルーブ, Urutoraman Rūbu) is a fusion of Ultraman Rosso and Blu achieved through Kiwami Crystal (極クリスタル, Kiwami Kurisutaru), created when R/B Crystals of Ultraman and Belial were scanned, followed by fusing with those of Taro, Ginga, Tiga and Victory as Katsumi activates it on the R/B Gyro.

The power of Ultraman Ruebe was already prophesied since Saki's original brothers obtain the crystals in Planet Sanja. However, they fail to utilize their power as the brothers fail to synchronize with their younger sister's heart. In the present day, this was accessed by the Minato brothers upon understanding the wish of their younger sister, which they put to use in against Grigio King. The fusion is only inaccessible if both brothers cannot synchronize properly.

Being a Super Ultraman in general, Ruebe demonstrates the ability to withstand Grigio King's Bone Breathter. Once Isami scans the New Generation Heroes Crystal (ニュージェネレーションヒーローズクリスタル, Nyū Jenerēshon Hīrōzu Kurisutaru), Ruebe can execute New Generation Barrier (ニュージェネレーションバリア, Nyū Jenerēshon Baria) by summoning New Generation Ultras to fire their finishing rays and counter their opponent's attack. His finisher is the Ruebium Ray (ルービウム光線, Rūbiumu Kōsen). His main weapon is the wind and fire wheels R/B Kourin (ルーブコウリン, Rūbu Kōrin), which has two different forms, depending on its user:

- Rosso Mode (ロッソモード, Rosso Mōdo): Turns into a buzzsaw-like weapon, imitating Katsumi/Rosso's fighting prowess. Its finisher is Ruebe Vortech Buster (ルーブボルテックバスター, Rūbu Borutekku Basutā).
- Blu Mode (ブルモード, Buru Mōdo): Allows high speed movements, imitating Isami/Blu's fighting prowess. Its finisher is Ruebe Kourin Shot (ルーブコウリンショット, Rūbu Kōrin Shotto).

Being the fusion of Rosso and Blu, Ruebe is voiced by Yuya Hirata and Ryosuke Koike.

=== Ultrawoman Grigio ===
Ultrawoman Grigio (ウルトラウーマングリージョ, Urutoraūman Gurījo) is the alter-ego of Asahi Minato after inheriting Saki Mitsurugi's Gyro. Despite being inadequate in combat, she is capable of defenses and healing an ally. Her name is based on Saki's actual birth name, which was coined by Asahi as a token of respect to her late friend.

It was first transformed in the middle of fighting against Tregear and Snake Darkness, as Saki's spirit interfered and synchronize with Asahi to turn Grigio Regina into her Ultrawoman namesake. Grigio joins the battle by healing Rosso, Blu and Geed before fusing with her brothers into Ultraman Gruebe. With the Minato brothers left Japan to study abroad, Grigio was remain behind to become Ayaka City's sole protector.

=== Ultraman Gruebe ===
Ultraman Gruebe (ウルトラマングルーブ, Urutoraman Gurūbu) is an Ultra who debuted in Ultraman R/B the Movie. He is a combination brought by Ultraman Rosso, Blu and Ultrawoman Grigio through the use of Makoto Crystal (マコトクリスタル, Makoto Kurisutaru). Like Ruebe, Gruebe has access to the R/B Kourin. The only finisher its shown is the Shin Vortech Buster.

=== Past Ultra Warriors ===
As a result of Rosso and Blu's crash landing on Earth, they were forcefully dispersed into R/B Crystals (ルーブクリスタル, Rūbu Kurisutaru), which scattered across Ayaka City. The Minato brothers are capable of using them with their R/B Gyros or R/B Sluggers to access different abilities for their Ultramen counterparts.

- Ultraman Taro (ウルトラマンタロウ, Urutoraman Tarō): His power dominates the Taro Crystal (タロウクリスタル, Tarō Kurisutaru), granting its user the fire-oriented Flame (フレイム, Fureimu) form. This crystal usually serves as Rosso's main power of choice. When inserted into his R/B Slugger, Blu can perform the Dynamite Slash (ダイナマイトスラッシュ, Dainamaito Surasshu). In Ultraman Festival 2018, he is voiced by Miyu Irino (入野 自由, Irino Miyu).
- Ultraman Ginga (ウルトラマンギンガ, Urutoraman Ginga): His power dominates the Ginga Crystal (ギンガクリスタル, Ginga Kurisutaru), granting its user the water-oriented Aqua (アクア, Akua) form. This crystal usually serves as Blu's main power of choice. When inserted into his R/B Slugger, Rosso and Blu can perform the Cross Spark Shoot (クロススパークシュート, Kurosu Supāku Shūto) and the Galaxy Saber (ギャラクシーセイバー, Gyarakushī Seibā) respectively.
- Ultraman Zero (ウルトラマンゼロ, Urutoraman Zero): His power dominates the Zero Crystal (ゼロクリスタル, Zero Kurisutaru) and was one of the three crystals given to Katsumi by Matsuo Kumashiro. When inserted into his R/B Slugger, Rosso can perform the Zero Twin Slicer (ゼロツインスライサー, Zero Tsuin Suraisā).
- Ultraseven (ウルトラセブン, Urutorasebun): His power dominates the Seven Crystal (セブンクリスタル, Sebun Kurisutaru) and was one of the three crystals given to Katsumi by Kumashiro. When inserted into his R/B Slugger, Blu can perform the Wide Shot Slugger (ワイドショットスラッガー, Waido Shotto Suraggā).
- Ultraman X (ウルトラマンエックス, Urutoraman Ekkusu): His power dominates the X Crystal (エックスクリスタル, Ekkusu Kurisutaru) and was one of the three crystals given to Katsumi by Kumashiro. When inserted into his R/B Slugger, Rosso and Blu can perform the Xanadium Sonic (ザナディウムソニック, Zanadiumu Sonikku) and the Spark Attacker (スパークアタッカー, Supāku Atakkā) respectively.
- Ultraman Tiga (ウルトラマンティガ, Urutoraman Tiga): His power dominates the Tiga Crystal (ティガクリスタル, Tiga Kurisutaru), granting its user the air-oriented Wind (ウインド, Uindo) form. This crystal was originally buried underground and was freed by the Ultras in the middle of a battle with Guebasser, allowing Blu to use its power and turn the tables of the battle. When inserted into R/B Slugger, Blu can perform the Bringer Slash (ブリンガースラッシュ, Buringā Surasshu).
- Ultraman Orb (ウルトラマンオーブ, Urutoraman Ōbu; 14): An Ultraman who rescued young Chereza in the past, his power dominates the Orb Origin Crystal (オーブオリジンクリスタル, Ōbu Orijin Kurisutaru). Initially damaged, Makoto (Chereza) fixed it by abducting several people.
  - Orb Ring NEO (オーブリングNEO, Ōbu Ringu Neo): The transformed form of the Orb Origin Crystal once scanned onto the R/B Gyro. It allows Makoto (Chereza) to transform into Ultraman Orb Dark by switching into Orb Dark Mode (オーブダークモード, Ōbu Dāku Mōdo). Under the custody of Minato brothers, Rosso and Blu are capable of using its default R/B Mode (ルーブモード, Rūbu Mōdo) to access Ultraman Orb's Sperion Ray (スペリオン光線, Superion Kōsen) and Zedcium Ray (ゼットシウム光線, Zettoshiumu Kōsen). By plugging it into the R/B Gyro, they can summon a giant projection of Orb Origin for all three of them to perform the Triple Origium Ray (トリプルオリジウム光線, Toripuru Orijiumu Kōsen).
- Ultraman Victory (ウルトラマンビクトリー, Urutoraman Bikutorī): His power dominates the Victory Crystal (ビクトリークリスタル, Bikutorī Kurisutaru), granting its user the Earth-oriented Ground (グランド, Gurando) form. This crystal was obtained by the Minato brothers in a strange cave after saving Asahi, providing them a means of counterattack. When inserted into his R/B Slugger, Blu can perform the Gravity Slasher (グラビティスラッシャー, Gurabiti Surasshā).
- Ultraman (ウルトラマン, Urutoraman): He was among the two crystals in Saki's possession, named Ultraman Crystal (ウルトラマンクリスタル, Urutoraman Kurisutaru) before relinquish it to Katsumi. When used in conjunction with Belial, they combine with Taro, Ginga, Tiga and Victory to create Kiwami Crystal.
- Ultraman Belial (ウルトラマンベリアル, Urutoraman Beriaru): He was among the two crystals in Saki's possession as Belial Crystal (ベリアルクリスタル, Beriaru Kurisutaru) before relinquish it to Isami. Aside from participating in the fusion of Kiwami Crystal, both Ultraman and Belial Crystals are notable for being six times stronger than normal R/B Crystal.
- Riku Asakura/Ultraman Geed (朝倉 リク/ウルトラマンジード, Asakura Riku/Urutoraman Jīdo; Movie): Although lacking a Crystal of his own, Geed participated in the New Generation Barrier when summoned by New Generation Heroes Crystal. In Ultraman R/B the Movie, Riku finds himself allying with the Minato brothers in against monster attacks in Ayaka City and faces against Ultraman Tregear, whose powers can rival his strongest form, Ultimate Final. Tatsuomi Hamada (濱田 龍臣, Hamada Tatsuomi) reprises his role as Riku Asakura.

== Antagonists ==
=== Chereza ===
Spirit Parasite Chereza (精神寄生体 チェレーザ, Seishin Kiseitai Cherēza) is an extraterrestrial life form and the main antagonist for the first half of the series. Chereza originated from another universe and, inspired by witnessing the heroics of Ultraman Orb, came to Earth where he possessed Makoto and studied the R/B Gyros in Aizentech before Mio left with it. When Mio's sons became Ultramen fifteen years later, Chereza deemed them unworthy of the title and orchestrate monster attacks as he abducted several people to repair the Orb Origin Crystal, effectively giving him the chance to become Ultraman Orb Dark. As he lost the Orb Ring NEO after Horoboros' reign of terror and defeated as Grigio King, Saki effectively exorcise him out and trapped Chereza in Aizentech's ventilation system.

Through his own Gyro known as the AZ Gyro (AZ(エーズィー)ジャイロ, Ē Zī Jairo), an imperfect replica of the R/B Gyros, Chereza can summon or transform into a monster via the respective Monster Crystal. His Gyro broke during Gubila's deployment, forcing him to resort to the real Gyro used by Saki. He was also in brief possession of Orb Ring NEO to become Ultraman Orb Dark. At some point of time, he secretly built the Anti-Monster Restraint System within Aizentech headquarters and a King Joe unit.

While voiced by Motoki Fukami, Chereza's younger self is voiced by Miki Ohtani (大谷 美紀, Ōtani Miki).

==== Ultraman Orb Dark ====
Ultraman Orb Dark (ウルトラマンオーブダーク, Urutoraman Ōbu Dāku; 8-12) (Note: Makoto (Chereza) refers to it as Ultraman Orb Dark Noir Black Schwarz (ウルトラマンンオーブダークノワールブラックシュバルツ, Urutoraman Ōbu Dāku Nowāru Burakku Shubarutsu).) is a jet-black copy of Ultraman Orb's Orb Origin form. A form Chereza assumes through the use of Orb Ring NEO to become an Ultraman as part of his lifelong dream of becoming a hero like Orb, despite initially using the form to fight the Minato brothers in what he considered a popularity contest. When Chereza assumes the form to fight against Horoboros, the very same monster that he summoned to recover the Orb Ring NEO, he loses it when Saki takes control of the monster with Makoto's body injured in the process.

The Orb Ring NEO allows Orb Dark to initiate finishers of Ultraman Orb's Fusion Up forms by pressing the central button. Once inserted into Makoto's Gyro, he can perform the Dark Origium Ray (ダークオリジウム光線, Dāku Orijiumu Kōsen). His main weapon is the Orb Dark Calibur (オーブダークカリバー, Ōbu Dāku Karibā), which allows him to perform elemental attacks:

- Orb Dark Rock Calibur (オーブダークロックカリバー, Ōbu Dāku Rokku Karibā): Performed by thrusting the sword into the ground and creates electrical sparks.
- Orb Dark Inferno Calibur (オーブダークインフェルノカリバー, Ōbu Dāku Inferuno Karibā): Performed by creating a ring of fire before launching it towards the opponent.
- Orb Dark Ice Calibur (オーブダークアイスカリバー, Ōbu Dāku Aisu Karibā): Performed by creating a series of ice eruptions as the ice blocks rain on the target.

=== Etelgar ===
Super Space-time Demon Etelgar (超時空魔神 エタルガー, Chō Jikū Majin Etarugā) is the primary antagonist of Ultraman Hit Song History: New Generation Chapter, who first appeared in Ultraman Ginga S The Movie. After surviving his defeat, Etelgar plotted his revenge by kidnapping Heisei Ultras again, forcing Zero to recruit Rosso and Blu in his mission. With all Ultras freed, Etelgar tries to fight them until he was defeated by Rosso, Blu, Zero Beyond and Geed.

Etelgar is voiced by You Murakami (村上 ヨウ, Murakami Yō).

=== Saki Mitsurugi/Grigio ===
Saki Mitsurugi (美剣 サキ, Mitsurugi Saki), (Note: Her given name is written in kanji as "沙姫".) real name Grigio (グリージョ, Gurījo), is the sister of Ultramen Rosso and Blu. All three siblings were originally orphans from the war-torn Planet Sanja (惑星サンジャ, Wakusei Sanja) under tutelage of Bakubarba and raised as thieves and assassins. Of the three siblings, Grigio became tired of her job until she heard the rumors of Planet O-50 in Planet Alcatraz. After a series of encounters by the Balsas Gang, the three siblings ended up on O-50's Warrior's Peak wherein their mutual goal of protecting Frau (フラウ, Furau) brings forth their R/B Gyros and Crystals to transform, using it to combat various evil in outer space. Initially distraught that her form as Grigio Bone only spreads fear, she finally gained respect by the Zarra (ザーラ, Zāra) tribesman after rescuing them as Grigio Regina. During their attempt to fight Leugocyte, the trio siblings and said monster were dragged into a wormhole that leads to an ancient Earth as Rosso and Blu sacrificed themselves to protect Grigio. The impact resulted in the fall of Ayaka Star (妖奇星, Ayaka-hoshi) while Grigio abandons her compassion out of grief for her brothers.

For 13 millennia, Grigio wandered around the Earth to plant space trees to reroute her late brothers' energy back to Japan, meeting with various historical figures and returned to Ayaka City in the present day. Saki first reveals herself during the Minato brothers' fight with Orb Dark, taking control of Horoboros in a display of power before she later purges Chereza from Makoto's body and sealing the alien within Aizentech's ventilation system. Saki then becomes the new president of Aizentech when regaining the Grigio Monster Crystal for her own agenda to destroy Leugocyte even if means destroying Earth while attempting to force the Minato brothers not to interfere. After the incident with the King Joe unit, Saki stole the R/B Gyro's from Katsumi and Isami, calling the two fake Ultramen. The two later attempted to get the Gyro's back, but Saki then tried to kill them, believing that they had found the Gyro's and were unworthy of them because they human. But she was proven wrong when the Gyro's protect the brothers from her blast. She planned on using the Earth as a giant bomb to destroy Leugocyte. Despite Katsumi and Isami saying that she couldn't, she believed that it was the only way. But befriending Asahi causes Saki to have a change of heart and sacrifices herself to save the Minato brothers from Leugocyte's beam, passing her Gyro to Asahi before fading away. A year later when Tregear commences his attack on Ayaka City, Saki's spirit merged with Asahi to turn Grigio Regina into Ultrawoman Grigio.

She is in possession of a different color version of the R/B Gyros, which, unlike Chereza's Gyro, can empower Monster Crystals to their full extent. Saki is incapable of transforming into an Ultra but assumes monster forms through Monster Crystals.

- Grigio (偶龍爾王(グルジオ), Gurujio): A monster form of her namesake which was her first transformation through the Gyro. Grigio and its later forms only exist as a transformation and therefore remains in different Monster Crystals before being transformed by users of R/B Gyros.
  - Flame Bone Monster Grigio Bone (火炎骨獣 グルジオボーン, Kaen Kotsu-jū Gurujio Bōn; 1, 7): The first form of Grigio, able to manipulate flames and fire a million degree flame from her mouth in her Bone Breathter (ボーンブレスター, Bōn Buresutā) attack. This crystal was Saki's first transformation in O-50, which she uses to assist Rosso and Blu in protecting Frau from the Balsas Gang. During her early days as Grigio Bone, Saki becomes an alternative to fight for her Ultramen brothers should their energy supply depleted. Saki lost the crystal upon her atmospheric entry on Earth, which lead to Chereza acquire it in the present day, initially using Grigio Bone to wreak havoc in Mt. Ayaka in the events that resulted in the Minato brothers first becoming Rosso and Blu. At some point of time, Chereza transformed into Grigio Bone twice through its crystal to fight against the Ultramen. Although the initial fight did not reach his satisfaction, Grigio Bone was defeated once more in an attack against a local hospital when Isami regains his composure to transform and assist Rosso in the nick of time. Saki reclaims it alongside other Monster Crystals in Chereza's possession after expelling him from Makoto's body.
  - Bombing Bone Monster Grigio King (爆撃骨獣 グルジオキング, Bakugeki Kotsu-jū Gurujio Kingu; 14, 15): The evolved form of Grigio Bone, armed with the Grigio Barrel (グルジオバレル, Gurujio Bareru) on its back to shoot Giga King Cannon (ギガキングキャノン, Giga Kingu Kyanon) and spew stronger variant of the Bone Breathter. Its Monster Crystal was acquired and utilized by Saki during one of her travels in outer space with her brothers. In the present day, Saki implores Chereza to use the monster as part of her ploy. As Grigio King, Chereza overpowered the Minato brothers until Saki ordered D.R.L.N. to fire the Anti-Monster Restraint System, putting Grigio King in suspended animation. Two days later, Saki purposely had Grigio King released to be defeated when Rosso and Blu formed Ruebe for the first time.
  - Super Armored Monster Grigio Regina (超鎧装獣 グルジオレギーナ, Chō Gaisō-jū Gurujio Regīna; 23, 24): The ultimate evolved form of Grigio Bone, her signature attack is Erga-Trio Cannon (エルガトリオキャノン, Erugatorio Kyanon), shooting beams from all three cannons on her chest. This crystal was obtained during the siblings' travel to Planet Gion (惑星ギオン, Wakusei Gion), where the Zarra tribes' determination gave her access to this form and first used it to kill Alien Egon "Ciel" and his Barrigator 2. On Earth, Saki used it in her conflict against the Minato brothers and eventually Leugocyte by empowering herself with Monster Crystals and her late brothers' Ray Line energy. After seeing her late brothers' images in the Minato brothers, Grigio Regina sacrificed herself to protect them and reverted to Saki before fading away as Saki. The Crystal and her R/B Gyro were inherited to Asahi as she used it to join Ultraman Ruebe and Geed in against Tregear and Snake Darkness. With the help of Saki's spirit, Grigio Regina transforms into Ultrawoman Grigio.
- Super-Class Monster Grand King Megalos (超弩級怪獣 グランドキングメガロス, Chō Do-kyū Kaijū Gurando Kingu Megarosu; 20): Transformed from Saki Mitsurugi, she used it to destroy a stray Gomora and fought against Rosso and Blu until they redirected the Megalos Blaster and uses Ground Explosion to defeat it. Using the Megalos Arm (メガロスアーム, Megarosu Āmu) on his left, he can conjure an energy blade and launches Megalos Blaster (メガロスブラスター, Megarosu Burasuta) from its mouth. It is a tribute to Grand King from Ultraman Story.
- Wild Fierce Monster Horoboros (豪烈暴獣 ホロボロス, Gōretsu Bō-jū Horoborosu; 10-12, 21, 22): A monster that unleashed on Ayaka City as part of Chereza's plan to outshine the Minato brothers as Orb Dark. Following the destruction of Bezelb, Saki had salvaged the crystal earlier and summons an evolved form of Horoboros that easily defeated all three Ultras at once. In its second rampage, Rosso and Blu managed to defeat it with the Orb Ring NEO's Triple Origium Ray. After deposing of Chereza, Saki assumes Horoboros form to fight the Minato brothers and later a dimension-hopping Kamisori Demaaga, defeated in both cases. In its quadrupedal state, the monster is capable of resisting average beam attacks and performs spinning attack. The evolution from Saki's Gyro provided it with Horoboro Claws (ホロボロクロー, Horoboro Kurō) on each arms to perform Megante Crusher (メガンテクラッシャー, Megante Kurasshā).

Saki Mitsurugi is portrayed by Ayane Kinoshita (木下 彩音, Kinoshita Ayane).

=== Leugocyte ===
Gaseous Life-form Leugocyte (ガス状生命体・ルーゴサイト, Gasu-jō Seimei-tai Rūgosaito) is the final antagonist of Ultraman R/B. In the past, Leugocyte was part of the space white blood cells (宇宙の白血球, Uchū no Hakkekkyū) tasked in eliminating threats to the space environment, until Ultraman Tregear altered its DNA to consume several non harmful planets. Rosso, Blu and Grigio were sent from the O-50 to deal with this threat but its might was too much for the three of them to handle. Leugocyte went circling the Earth for 1,300 years while Rosso and Blu died from protecting Grigio.

In the present day, Leugocyte approaches Earth as Grigio, now Saki Mitsurugi, prepared to use the planet as a bomb to destroy it. In order for this to work, she reclaimed her brothers' Gyros from the Minato brothers and attempted to activate all three Gyros at once to force Leugocyte into a corporeal state. Although this plan was successfully carried out by Mio Minato, who tried to banish the Crystal-imprisoned Leugocyte into a different dimension, Saki stole it from her as she remains adamant to her original suicidal plan. Her successful fight against the Minato brothers was exploited by the now corporeal Leugocyte to escape and resume its reign of terror. Seeing as all her plans went south, Mio attempted to banish Leugocyte into a black hole by taking herself and the Aizentech tower with it but was stopped by the Minato brothers as they transform to fight against the monster. With the help of Asahi as Makoto Crystal, Ultraman Ruebe performs Shin Vortech Buster and destroy Leugocyte once and for all.

In its original form, Leugocyte was portrayed as a sentient gas cloud that performs phagocytosis on planets and can fire the Genesis Requiem (ゲネシスレクイエム, Geneshisu Rekuiemu) for offensive purposes. Upon being sealed within the dragon-element Monster Crystal and escaped, it became Cosmos Eater Leugocyte (コスモイーター ルーゴサイト, Kosumo Ītā Rūgosaito), a corporeal dragon-like monster whose invincible to almost every forms of attacks. Aside from retaining Genesis Requiem, it can also conjure a pair of Leugo Tentacles (ルーゴテンタクル, Rūgo Tentakuru) for constriction, wings for aerial combat, Genesis Rain (ゲネシスレイン, Geneshisu Rein) missiles from its tail, and the Genesis Seal (ゲネシスシール, Geneshisu Shīru) barrier.

=== Ultraman Tregear ===
Ultraman Tregear (ウルトラマントレギア, Urutoraman Toregia) is the main antagonist of Ultraman R/B The Movie, guest appearing before his prominent role in Ultraman Taiga.

A dark Ultra whose presence is dreaded across the universe, Tregear found enjoyment in meddling with the affairs of other civilizations and led them to destruction. Tregear was responsible for the events of Ultraman R/B taking place by corrupting Leugocyte into a mindless planet-eating monster, which resulted with the deaths of the original Rosso and Blu, the Minato brothers taking their mantle and lastly Saki Mitsurugi almost endangering the Earth to destroy it.

Tregear reappeared on Earth a year after Leugocyte's destruction, where he transplanted Riku Asakura to Minato city and trapped his companion Pega into Gan-Q, hoping to create a dilemma between two friends and further descending the young boy to the same path as Belial. When the Minato brothers interfere and helped Riku with his situation, Tregear then turned his target to Katsumi Minato for being the frequent user of Taro Crystal, since it represent his old friend Ultraman Taro. To do this, he corrupted Yukio into the monster he designed, Snake Darkness and trapped Rosso to Hoster 21 System for his pawn to terrorize Ayaka City uninterrupted. However, when Katsumi returned and Yukio almost snapped from his brainwashing by his mother Yukie, Tregear was forced to step in by further brainwashing his pawn via Ischyros Dynamis (イスキュロス・ダイナミス, Isukyurosu Dainamisu) into a mindless beast and fought against the combined forces of Ultraman Geed Ultimate Final and Ultraman Gruebe. He was seemingly killed by Geed's Wrecking Nova, but Tregear survived and flee from Planet Earth.

Ultraman Tregear is voiced by Yuma Uchida (内田 雄馬, Uchida Yūma), ahead of his appearance in Ultraman Taiga.

=== Snake Darkness ===
Evil Wish Beast Snake Darkness (邪願獣 スネークダークネス, Jagan-jū Sunēku Dākunesu) is Ultraman Tregear's monster servant. Originally Yukio Toi (戸井 ゆきお, Toi Yukio), Katsumi's former colleague who failed in his dream as a game developer, he was approached by Ultraman Tregear and transformed into Snake Darkness.

It possesses the Shadow Scissors (シャドウシザース, Shadō Shizāsu) on its right hand for the Guillotine Judge (ギロチンジャッジ, Girochin Jajji) and Demon Blood Judge (デモンブラッドジャッジ, Demon Buraddo Jajji) attacks, and the Darkness Eater (ダークネスイーター, Dākunesu Ītā) tail. It can fire the Tragedy Shout (トラジェディシャウト, Torajedi Shauto) ray from its mouth and the Inferno Bullets (インフェルノバレット, Inferuno Baretto) from its shoulders, and perform the Great Execution (グレートエクスキューション, Gurēto Ekusukyūshon) diving attack. After Tregear drives it berserk, the monster can fire the Tragedy Shout Hell (トラジェディシャウト・ヘル, Torajedi Shauto Heru) ray, a stronger version of the Tragedy Shout.

Yukio Toi is portrayed by Yukito Nishii (西井 幸人, Nishii Yukito).

== Other characters ==
- Matsuo Kumashiro (熊城 松雄, Kumashiro Matsuo; 4): A coach for the White Bears amateur baseball team who previously supported Katsumi in his high school years before he quits baseball. In his retirement day, Kumashiro gave Katsumi the R/B Crystals of Ultraseven, Zero and X, all three of them previously kept by his family for generations under guidance of the Ultramen in their dreams. He is portrayed by Sei Hiraizumi (平泉 成, Hiraizumi Sei), who previously known for the role of Tatsumi Chiba in Ultraman Gaia.
- Yuha Ninomiya (二宮 ユウハ, Ninomiya Yūha; 5, Movie): A female student in Isami's college whose desire to fly stems from the boredom of living in a wealthy family. After multiple failures, she was assisted by Isami in creating her mechanical wings and managed to fly in the midst of Guebasser's reign of terror. She eventually quit the college and left to study abroad. She is portrayed by Kanoko Sudo (須藤 叶希, Sudō Kanoko).
- Kaoru Komaki (小牧 カオル, Komaki Kaoru; 6, 7): (Note: Her given name is written in kanji as "薫".) A former policewoman who was notorious for picking up a fight against the Minato brothers in the youth, which in reality, she was trying to protect them from harm. After quitting her job, she travels across the world and visited the Minato family's Quattro M every four years with different jobs. After a recent visit to the Minato family, she was kidnapped by Chereza and bounded into Mecha Gomora as a plot to make the fight against the Ultramen more interesting, until Blu destroyed the monster as Rosso saved her via Wind form. While recovering at a local hospital, she was caught in a crossfire between Grigio Bone and Rosso before Isami joined in with his renewed determination. With the fight ended, Kaoru was fully healed and left the Ayaka City. She is portrayed by Yuri Kobayashi (小林 由梨, Kobayashi Yuri).
- Erina (えりな; 8, 9, 17, Movie) and Nanaka (ななか; 8, 9, 17, Movie): Asahi's high school friends. They are portrayed by Yua Shiraishi (白石 優愛, Shiraishi Yua) and Nanako Ōde (大出 菜々子, Ōde Nanako) respectively.

== Monsters and aliens ==
=== Monster Crystals ===
The Monster Crystals (怪獣クリスタル, Kaijū Kurisutaru) are antithesis of the R/B Crystals, which embodied the Ultra Monsters. When inserted into the Gyro, the user can either summon or transform into said monster through their corresponding Crystal. The crystals were collected by Saki during her time fighting for the peace of their homeworld alongside her brothers, Rosso and Blu. She lost several of her sets during their first arrival to Ayaka City, where Chereza collected them for his own ends.

- Bodyguard Monster Black King (用心棒怪獣 ブラックキング, Yōjinbō Kaijū Burakku Kingu; 2): Black King was summoned by mysterious summoner to attack the Ayaka City during the daylight. After rescuing Isami from a steel beam, Katsumi and the former transform using each other's crystals. They switch back to their original forms and sent the monster flying above before ending its reign of terror with their combined finishers. It can exhale Lava Heat Ray (溶岩熱線, Yōgan Nessen) from its mouth and possess the brute strength of 300,000 t. In terms of close combat, Black King is protected by its durable skin and uses its cranial horn as a weapon. First appeared in episode 37 of Return of Ultraman.
- Petrification Evil Monster Gargorgon (石化魔獣 ガーゴルゴン, Sekika Majū Gāgorugon; 3): An intelligent space monster that appeared on Ayaka City during the Minato siblings' visit to Aizentech. After saving Blu from his petrifaction, Rosso devised a plan to switch forms and reflected Gargorgon's signature attack to herself before the duo Ultramen finished her with Cross Slugger. Notorious for its ability to destroy a planet, Gargorgon is capable of unleashing energy beams from its shoulders and petrify its opponents via a ray fired from a hidden eye on its mouth. First appeared in episodes 6 and 7 of Ultraman X.
- Skull Monster Red King (どくろ怪獣 レッドキング, Dokuro Kaijū Reddo Kingu; 4): It was summoned by Chereza twice to interrupt Katsumi's baseball match. Although victorious in the first battle, Red King appeared in the mountains and fought Blu before Rosso joined the battle. With the help of Zero Crystal, Rosso defeated Red King with Zero Twin Slicer. First appeared in episode 8 of Ultraman.
- Raptorial Monster Guebasser (猛禽怪獣 グエバッサー, Mōkin Kaijū Guebassā; 5): A giant bird themed after crested ibis that was sent to claim the Tiga Crystal. By flapping its wings, Guebasser can initiate the Basabasser (バサバッサー, Basabassā), creating typhoons and cyclone on its path and launches feather as projectile attacks. In Ayaka City, the monster was a formidable opponent towards the Ultramen until the Tiga Crystal surfaced, allowing Blu to assume Wind and counter the monster's cyclone before the two Ultras finished it. According to director Kiyotaka Taguchi, Guebasser is a "wild type" (野生体, Yasei-tai) of Maga-Basser from episode 1 of Ultraman Orb.
- Robot Monster Mecha Gomora (ロボット怪獣 メカゴモラ, Robotto Kaijū Meka Gomora; 6): Summoned by Chereza from its Monster Crystal, Mecha Gomora fought against Rosso and Blu before retreating. In its second appearance, Makoto had Kaoru, an old friend of the Minato brothers bounded into Mecha Gomora. Blu destroyed it with Ultraseven's power while Rosso managed to save the hostage with Wind form. First appeared in Ultra Galaxy Legend Side Story: Ultraman Zero vs. Darklops Zero.
- Space Devil Bezelb (宇宙悪魔 ベゼルブ, Uchū Akuma Bezerubu; 11): Summoned as part of an arranged mock fight for Orb Dark. Rosso and Blu interfered their fight and defeated the monster before facing Orb Dark. Aside from the ability to fly, Bezelb can launch Bomber Inferno (ボンバーインフェルノ, Bonbā Inferuno) from its mouth. First appeared as one of the major antagonists of Ultraman Orb: The Origin Saga.
- Deep Sea Monster Gubila (深海怪獣 グビラ, Shinkai Kaijū Gubira; 13, 14): Summoned by Chereza in an attempt to fight against the Minato brothers, unfortunately his Gyro broke and this forced Gubila to shrink before reverting to its Monster Crystal. First appeared in episode 24 of Ultraman.
- Invisible Monster Neronga (透明怪獣 ネロンガ, Tōmei Kaijū Neronga; 16): A monster that was summoned by Saki to siphon Ayaka City's power supply and redirect them to the Aizentech's main headquarters. First appeared in episode 3 of Ultraman.
- Space Robot King Joe (宇宙ロボット キングジョー, Uchū Robotto Kingu Jō; 19): A robot which Chereza built in secret at some point of time, D.R.L.N. awakened it to re-initiate her former master's AZ Plan and at the same time trying to eliminate Saki by kidnapping Asahi in a hostage crisis. Having formed an uneasy alliance with the Minato brothers, Saki managed to rescue her before Rosso and Blu cracked its Pedanium armor and destroy it as Ruebe with Ruebe Vortech Buster. Using her Gyro, Saki harvested the remains of King Joe into a R/B Crystal. First appeared in episode 14 of Ultraseven.

=== Others ===
- Giant-Ant Terrible-Monster Aribunta (大蟻超獣 アリブンタ, Ōari Chōjū Aribunta; 8): Appeared from a self-made pit in Ayaka City, it fought against the Ultramen and defeated by Rosso Wind and Blu Flame's Fire Tornado. First appeared in episode 5 of Ultraman Ace.
- Ancient Monster Gomess (S) (古代怪獣 ゴメス(S), Kodai Kaijū Gomesu (Esu); 10): A monster that appeared in the cold opening, it was defeated after Blu Ground pummels the Earth with his Earth Bringer and Rosso Wind firing his Sperion Ray. First appeared in episode 1 of Ultra Galaxy Mega Monster Battle: Never Ending Odyssey.
- Three-Faced Phantom Dada (三面怪人 ダダ, Sanmen Kaijin Dada; 17, 18): A Dadaism-themed alien from Planet Dada. He gave an anonymous interview in a NPTV documentary. He is voiced by Kōichi Toshima (外島 孝一, Toshima Kōichi). First appeared in episode 28 of Ultraman.
- Friendly Monster Pigmon (友好珍獣 ピグモン, Yūkō Chinjū Pigumon; 17, Movie): A small friendly monster who accidentally sent the invitation to Dada's alien party late for Booska. He was sent by Dada to gather humans for his second attempt to recreate the party. First appeared in episode 8 of Ultraman.
- Friendly Monster Booska (快獣 ブースカ, Kaijū Būsuka; 17): The titular protagonist from 1966-1967 family sitcom Kaiju Booska. After shrinking Dada for his troubles, Booska apologizes on his behalf as he called a truce between Ultras and monsters for their party. He is voiced by Miina Tominaga (冨永 みーな, Tominaga Mīna), who previously portrayed Kaoru Umeda in Ultraman Leo.
- Malicious Alien Alien Mefilas (悪質宇宙人 メフィラス星人, Akushitsu Uchūjin Mefirasu Seijin; 18): A TV director at NPTV who assumes the human identity of Shunji Suzuki (鈴木 俊次, Suzuki Shunji) while working on Earth. He is voiced by Takehiko Yamaguchi (山口 岳彦, Yamaguchi Takehiko), who also portrays his human form. First appeared in episode 33 of Ultraman.
- Evil Alien Alien Zarab (凶悪宇宙人 ザラブ星人, Kyōaku Uchūjin Zarabu Seijin; 18): A TV assistant director at NPTV who assumes the human identity of Saburo Yamada (山田 三郎, Yamada Saburō) while working on Earth. He is voiced by Kazuki Takeuchi (竹内 一希, Takeuchi Kazuki), who also portrays his human form. First appeared in episode 18 of Ultraman.
- Brain Alien Alien Chibull (頭脳星人 チブル星人, Zunō Seijin Chiburu Seijin; 18): A TV producer at NPTV. He is voiced by Ryuzou Ishino (石野 竜三, Ishino Ryūzō). First appeared in episode 9 of Ultraseven.
- Transforming Phantom Alien Pitt (変身怪人 ピット星人, Henshin Kaijin Pitto Seijin; 18): A popular news anchor. She is voiced by Haruna Terada (寺田 晴名, Terada Haruna). First appeared in episode 3 of Ultraseven.
- Space Emperor Alien Bado (宇宙帝王 バド星人, Uchū Teiō Bado Seijin; 18): An alien who received a street interview from the NPTV crew. He is voiced by Holly Kaneko (金子 はりい, Kaneko Harii). First appeared in episode 19 of Ultraseven.
- Assassin Alien Alien Nackle (暗殺宇宙人 ナックル星人, Ansatsu Uchūjin Nakkuru Seijin; 18): An alien who received a street interview from the NPTV crew. He is voiced by Tetsuo Kishi (岸 哲生, Kishi Tetsuo). First appeared in episode 39 of Return of Ultraman.
- Ancient Monster Gomora (古代怪獣 ゴモラ, Kodai Kaijū Gomora; 20): An ancient monster that lay dormant under the Ayaka City until Saki's attempt to force resonate with the R/B Gyros and her own accidentally awaken the monster. Gomora shrugged off the Aizentech's Anti-Monster Restraint System and fought against Rosso and Blu before being defeated by Grand King Megalos. First appeared in episode 26 of Ultraman.
- Dimensional Evil Beast Kamisori Demaaga (次元凶獣 カミソリデマーガ, Jigen Kyō-jū Kamisori Demāga; 22): A stronger variant of Demaaga from episode 1 of Ultraman X, appearing in the first live stage of Ultraman Festival 2018.
- Alien Pegassa "Pega" (ぺガッサ星人 ぺガ, Pegassa Seijin Pega; Movie): Riku/Geed's alien companion. His voice role is reprised by Megumi Han (潘 めぐみ, Han Megumi).
- Great Space Monster Bemstar (宇宙大怪獣 ベムスター, Uchū Dai Kaijū Bemusutā; Movie): Geed defeated it with the Strike Boost. First appeared in episode 18 of Return of Ultraman.
- Strange Creature Gan-Q (奇獣 ガンQ, Ki-jū Gan Kyū; Movie): Rosso and Blu defeated it with the Splash Bomb and the Storm Shooting. First appeared in episode 6 of Ultraman Gaia.
- Robot Monster Mecha Gomora (Movie): Appeared on a planet where Pigmons inhabit, Rosso defeated it with the Orb Ring NEO's Zedcium Ray.

=== Novel-exclusives ===
- Bakubarba (バクバーバ, Bakubāba): A spider-like alien who manages the House of Bakubarba (バクバーバの家, Bakubāba no Ie), the orphanage where Rosso, Blu, Saki and other orphans of Planet Sanja. Despite her kind and caring facade, in truth Bakubarba personally trains the orphans into hired mercenaries for her own ends and even engaged with various criminal activities. She sent Saki and her brothers into various mercenary works before secretly banishing them out of the planet due to being the target of various criminal groups. When the siblings return, Saki killed Bakubarba after she turned the orphanage into a child-trafficking hub, giving its ownership to the Interstellar Alliance alongside its orphans.
- Plant Monster Nero (植物怪獣 ネーロ, Shokubutsu Kaijū Nēro): A guardian monster of Planet Dontak (惑星ドンタク, Wakusei Dontaku), Nero was responsible for the planet's rich in vegetation and therefore revered by the Bosco Tribe (ボスコ族, Bosuko-zoku), who in turn gave it a sacrifice in the form of young virgin women in every decade. Under the wish of their client Largo (ラルゴ, Rarugo), Bakubarba sent the three siblings to kill the monster as they interrupt the sacrificial ceremony. With its life force tied to Bianca (ビアンカ, Bianka), Saki was forced to kill her newfound friend while Largo sent his protege to cleanse the entire forest and its tribe for their precious minerals to be mined.
- Balsas (バルサス, Barusasu): One of the bosses of a space gang which set their sight on Rosso, Blu and Saki after numerous deaths of gang members. When the troop that chased the siblings to Planet O-50 were eliminated, Balsas set their group in a final fight by unleashing their monster Fearmonger.
- Freezing Monster Margodon (冷凍怪獣 マーゴドン, Reitō Kaijū Māgodon): Balsas' monster in possession, first appeared in episode 50 of Ultraman 80. It leads a band of mercenaries towards the three siblings, Rosso, Blu and Saki while climbing the cold mountain Warrior's Peak of O-50. The monster and the entire Balsas troop were killed by Rosso, Blu and Grigio upon their transformation into Ultramen and monster.
- Strongest Monster Fearmonger (最強怪獣 フィアモンガ, Saikyō Kaijū Fiamonga): The strongest monster on Balsas' possession, it was released for the final fight against the three siblings after they killed Bakubarba. Although the battle ended with Rosso, Blu and Grigio King victorious, the two brothers previously failed in trying to unite their powers into Ultraman Ruebe due to their inability to resonate with Saki.
- Alien Egon "Ciel" (エゴン星人 シーレ, Egon Seijin Shīre): A greedy alien whose interested in the rare minerals of Planet Gion. To that end, he brought the Barrigator robots to eliminate the entire Zarra Tribe and faced against the three siblings. While trying to escape Grigio Regina, Ciel used the escape pod to exit his second Barrigator but was incinerated and reduced to dusts by Regina's energy beam.
- Murderous Robot Weapons Barrigator (殺人ロボット兵器 バリゲーター, Satsujin Robotto Heiki Barigētā): A pair of robots used by Alien Egon "Ciel" to invade Planet Gion and eliminate the Zarra Tribe. While leaving the first model autopiloted against Rosso and Blu, Ciel rode the second model to eliminate the Zarra people as Saki obtained the Grigio Regina crystal and used its massive power to disable the robot.
