= Dinosaur Corps Koseidon =

- Genre: Tokusatsu
- Developed by: Masaki Tsuji
- Directed by: Toru Toyama
- Country of origin: Japan
- Original language: Japanese
- No. of episodes: 52

Production
- Production companies: Tokyo Channel 12; Tsuburaya Productions

Original release
- Network: Tokyo Channel 12
- Release: July 7, 1978 – June 29, 1979

Dinosaur Corps Koseidon (恐竜戦隊コセイドン, Kyōryū Sentai Koseidon) is a Japanese tokusatsu superhero science fiction adventure television series produced by Tsuburaya Productions in two seasons aired from July 7, 1978 to June 29, 1979. The series lasted for a total of 52 episodes. The series told the adventures of Go, a superhero leading a patrol who travel in time to defeat the Godmess Empire (ゴドメス星人, Godomesu Seijin), an alien armada who, after landing on Earth 70 million years ago, has altered the course of time. Go's enemies include dinosaurs which are telepathically controlled by the aliens. He has the ability to stop time for 30 seconds. Koseidon is the name allowing Go and his mates to time travel. A film adaptation, titled Koseison, is planned by Tencent Pictures, with Takashige Ichise producing.

== International Broadcasts ==
In the Philippines, the series was aired on ABS-CBN as simply Koseidon from 1991 to 1994 with a Tagalog dub.
