= List of Ultraman Ginga characters =

Ultraman Ginga (ウルトラマンギンガ, Urutoraman Ginga) is a Japanese television series produced by Tsuburaya Productions which celebrates the 50th anniversary of the company and is part of the New Ultraman Retsuden programming block on TV Tokyo. It was succeeded by later instalments Ultraman Ginga S and Ultra Fight Victory.

== Protagonists ==
=== Hikaru Raido ===
The main protagonist, Hikaru Raido (礼堂 ヒカル, Raidō Hikaru) is a teenager that moved to London due to his parents' desires to become musicians. He returned and took a visit back to his hometown, Furoboshi, during the summer break after receiving a strange vision, which led him to the possession of Ginga Spark, an ancient item that allows him to unite with Ultraman Ginga through UltLive (ウルトライブ, Urutoraibu). Due to this, he was guided by Ultraman Taro to defeat and collect Spark Dolls that used by evil-hearted people, at the same time trying to discover the perpetrator behind these chaos. After every Spark Dolls had been freed from their curses, Hikaru was tasked by Ginga to go on an adventure around the Earth and meet him again once his job had done.

Two years later in Ultraman Ginga S, he returned to Japan again after receiving another vision during his travel in Yucatán Peninsula, Mexico. He was dragged into the battle again when a new villain, Exceller wanted to usurp the Earth's supply of Victoriums. Hikaru joined the attack team UPG and reunites with his old friend, Tomoya and Taro as well as Ultraman Ginga. He also receives aid from Sho, a Victorian prince who becomes the host of Ultraman Victory. At the end of the series, when both Hikaru and Sho defeated Vict Lugiel, the two parted ways and Hikaru resumes his travel on the world.

During the event of Ultraman Ginga S The Movie, Hikaru returns to UPG after a year travelling abroad but once again joining forces with Sho/Victory after Etelgar tried to imprison their Ultras. The two were trained by Ultraman Zero to cooperate with each other and gained the Ultra Fusion Brace when their training had been approved by him. Along with Zero, they freed the imprisoned Heisei Ultras and fought against Etelgar and his army of Eteldummy. In Ultra Fight Victory, Hikaru/Ginga was captured and made as a hostage in Satellite Golgotha by Yapool as a plot to revive Juda. Ace tried to free Ginga but Victory-Killer overpowered him until Sho/Victory Knight saved them. Soon Hikaru joined the Showa Ultras to fight Super Grand King Spectre while Victory defeated Juda Spectre.

Hikaru Raido is portrayed by Takuya Negishi (根岸 拓哉, Negishi Takuya). As a child, Hikaru is portrayed by Aren Yasui (安井 亜漣, Yasui Aren).

=== Tomoya Ichijoji ===
Tomoya Ichijoji (一条寺 友也, Ichijōji Tomoya) is a child prodigy of the Ichijoji Group that moved to the Furuhoshi sometime before Hikaru's arrival. He is talented in academic and sports but lives under his parents' shadow after his dream of becoming just like his father had been denied. He was given the Dark Dummy Spark and Jean-Killer's Spark Doll, using it to attack Ginga by controlling the robot with Gunpad. Having kidnapped Taro, Tomoya tried to use him to defeat Hikaru but failed and was banished when his service was no longer needed. Hikaru gives him a dream, to surpass Ultraman Ginga and this becomes Tomoya's motivation to redeem his past mistakes, thus purifying Jean-Killer as Jean-Nine.

During the events of Ultraman Ginga Theater Special: Ultra Monster ☆ Hero Battle Royal!, his drawings of Ultra Monsters manifested into fake Spark Dolls by the mysterious cosmic energy, as he invited his friend to play with them until the fake Spark Dolls reverted into his drawing book.

Two years later in Ginga S, Tomoya joined the attack team UPG in order to combat against Exceller. He works as their analyzer and stations in the Ichijoji Lab. He welcomes Hikaru into the team and was originally the only one beside Taro to know of Hikaru and Sho's identities as Ultraman Ginga and Victory respectively. Meanwhile, after Android One-Zero, Exceller's former minion sacrificed her own to sabotage Vict Lugiel for the Ultras to finish him in the finale, Tomoya salvaged her Victorium Necklace, which contained her imprints and memories that allow him to rebuild her.

Tomoya Ichijoji is portrayed by the main dancer of Bullet Train Takuya Kusakawa (草川 拓弥, Kusakawa Takuya).

=== Sho ===
Sho (ショウ, Shō) is one of the main characters of Ultraman Ginga S and is a young Victorian that was sent to retrieve the Victorium after they were stolen by Exceller. He was given the Victory Lancer, allowing him to become Ultraman Victory. At first, Sho appeared to be stoic and cold hearted due to his disgust for humanity despite his mother's wish for him to make peace with them. He is also hesitated to use the Ultra's UlTrans ability cause him unable to fully manifest Victory's full power but manages to do so after correcting his mistake. After both Ginga and Victory managed to defeat Vict Lugiel, Sho and Hikaru parted ways.

During the event of Ultraman Ginga S The Movie, when Etelgar proves to be a bigger threat to both Hikaru and Sho, Ultraman Zero gives them an intensive training and granted them the Ultra Fusion Brace, allowing them to become Ultraman Gingavictory to defeat Etelgar and his Eteldummy armies alongside other past Heisei Ultras. At the end, he was given a membership in UPG by Yoshiaki.

In Ultra Fight Victory, when Yapool planned to revive Juda, he was bestowed the Knight Timbre by Hikari to become Ultraman Victory Knight in order to stop Juda and return the stolen Victorium energies. After the whole ordeal was done, Sho tried to return the Knight Timbre, but Hikari refused and allows him to keep it for the Earth's future.

Sho is portrayed by Kiyotaka Uji (宇治 清高, Uji Kiyotaka). As a child, Sho is portrayed by Reigo Mizoguchi (溝口 怜冴, Mizoguchi Reigo).

== Furoboshi Town residents ==
=== Supporting characters ===
- Misuzu Isurugi (石動 美鈴, Isurugi Misuzu): One of Hikaru's childhood friends. She dreams of becoming a confectioner and worked as the Ginga Shrine priestess during the summer break. Her dream to become a confectioner was due to the strained relationship she had with her father, wanting him to taste her mother's sweets again. During episode eight, her desire to help Hikaru granted her the Ginga Light Spark (ギンガライトスパーク, Ginga Raito Supāku), allowing her to become Red King to face Zaragas when Hikaru was left hopeless after the Ginga Spark being stolen. She was given the chance to become Jashrin with Chigusa and Kenta to fight Antlar and at that time, she discovered her father as the true identity of Ultraman/Ultraseven Dark, further straining their relationship. It was at this time where her heart was manipulated by Gray into becoming Super Grand King until Hikaru managed to bring her back. Eventually, Seiichirō make amends for his mistake to Misuzu during the end of the series, thus reuniting their bond as a family. Two years later in Ginga S, Misuzu successfully achieve her lifelong dream and visited the now UPG officer Hikaru. She also manage to convince Android One-Zero, Exceller's former minion to turn over a new leaf and granted her a new name, Mana. Misuzu Isurugi is portrayed by Mio Miyatake (宮武 美桜, Miyatake Mio). As a child, Misuzu is portrayed by Misato Miyasaka (宮坂 美里, Miyasaka Misato).
- Kenta Watarai (渡会 健太, Watarai Kenta): One of Hikaru's childhood friends and an aspiring photographer. He initially had a crush on Misuzu but rejected it and choose Chigusa instead. During episode 5, he was corrupted by Alien Valkie out of his fear of being betrayed and almost DarkLived into Doragory until managed to return his senses. His desire to help those in need in the series grants him the Ginga Light Spark and allows him to UltLive as Jashrin (along with Misuzu and Chigusa) and Ultraman Tiga. In the events of Extra Episode, Kenta and Chigusa became Ultraman Tiga and Ultraman respectively to stop Alien Magma and Zetton from blowing Japan but their efforts were almost futile until Ginga returned to their aid. Two years later in Ginga S, he becomes the recorder for Chigusa's performances as an idol, marking his first step into the world of photography. He as well record Chigusa's performance to cheer up and encourage the victims of Vict Lugiel's attack to resist against his reign of terror. Kenta Watarai is portrayed by Mizuki Ohno (大野 瑞生, Ōno Mizuki).
- Chigusa Kuno (久野 千草, Kuno Chigusa): One of Hikaru's childhood friend and dreams of becoming an idol. She secretly harbours a crush on Kenta. During episode 4, her jealousy for Misuzu due to being picked as a model instead of her allows Alien Valkie to corrupt her heart and becomes Ragon but Hikaru managed to return her back to her senses. Her desire to help those in need in the series granted her the Ginga Light Spark, allowing her to become Jashrin (along with Kenta and Misuzu) and Ultraman. In the events of Extra Episode, Chigusa and Kenta became Ultraman and Ultraman Tiga respectively to stop Alien Magma and Zetton from blowing Japan but their efforts were almost futile until Ginga returned to their aid. She became Ultraman again in the Mountain Peanuts short story in order to defeat Nosferu. Two years later in Ginga S, Chigusa finally succeeded her life in becoming an idol, first singing Ultraman Ginga no Uta. She also made another performance to cheer up and encourage the victims of Vict Lugiel's attack to resist against his reign of terror. Chigusa Kuno is portrayed by Kirara (雲母).

=== Minor characters ===
- Hotsuma Raido (礼堂 ホツマ, Raidō Hotsuma): Hikaru's grandfather, Hotsuma is the priest for the Ginga Shrine. When it was destroyed in a meteorite shower, Hotsuma moved the shrine to the Furuhoshi Elementary School to guide its relic, Ginga Spark. While he is also aware of Hikaru's identity as Ginga and the series' plot, Hotsuma is also revealed to be a Chosen One picked by the Ginga Spark. He helps Hikaru and his friend by exposing Kyōko Shirai, the school's principal as the host of Dark Lugiel. He is portrayed by Masahiko Tsugawa (津川 雅彦, Tsugawa Masahiko).
- Kyōko Shirai (白井 杏子, Shirai Kyōko): The principal of the Private Furuhoshi Elementary School (私立降星小学校, Shiritsu Furuhoshi Shōgakkō), she was at wit's end when the school was about to be demolished and one night, while she was wandering in the ruins of the Ginga Shrine after a meteorite shower, she found the Dark Spark and unknowingly possessed by Dark Lugiel. Lugiel feed on her darkness, as well as her former students that walked into the wrong path and thus allowing him to be revived. She was finally freed from his control when she refused Lugiel to use her students again, allowing her to gain a Ginga Light Spark and return Taro into his original form. She is portrayed by Hana Kino (木野 花, Kino Hana).
- Seiichirō Isurugi (石動 誠一郎, Isurugi Seiichirō; 7-11): Misuzu's father, he prioritizes work than his families, causing a strain in his relationship with his daughter. He originally plans to buy the Furuhoshi Elementary School compound and trapped inside it, as well as given the Spark Dolls of Ultraman and Ultraseven by Gray to become Ultraman Dark and Ultraseven Dark. He defeated Hikaru in their first encounter and invited him in his quest to rule over everything but rejected and defeated by Hikaru. His daughter further resented him after being caught as the dark Ultras' identity red handed and caused her to be manipulated as Super Grand King. Realised his mistake, Seiichirō became Ultraseven again to help Ginga reach Misuzu but failed. In the last episode, Seiiichirō apologized to Misuzu as their family relationship started anew. He is portrayed by Hironobu Nomura (野村 宏伸, Nomura Hironobu).
- Shingo Kuwabara (桑原 伸吾, Kuwabara Shingo; 7-11): A germophobic architectural designer, Shingo is one of Seiichirō's subordinates. Once he learned that he was trapped in the space time continuum with everyone in the Furuhoshi Elementary School, his desire to escape allows Gray to manipulate him into Zaragas. He was returned to normal by Ultraman Ginga and Red King (Misuzu). In the final, he and Tomomi happily decided not to demolish this school after the Furuhoshi Town residents voiced their objection. He is portrayed by Shohei Abe (阿部 翔平, Abe Shōhei).
- Tomomi Kuroki (黒木 知美, Kuroki Tomomi; 7-11): A representative of the Ichinotani construction company, Tomomi is one of Seiichirō's subordinates. Once she learned that she was trapped in the space time continuum with everyone in the Furuhoshi Elementary School, her desire to escape allows Gray to manipulate her into Antlar. She was returned to normal by Ultraseven Dark (Seiichirō), who betrayed her. In the final, she and Shingo happily decided not to demolish this school after the Furuhoshi Town residents voiced their objection. She is portrayed by Maiko Kawakami (川上 麻衣子, Kawakami Maiko).

=== Furuhoshi Elementary School graduates ===
- Taichi Kakisaki (柿崎 太一, Kakisaki Taichi; 1-4, 6-11): Nicknamed Kaki (カッキー, Kakkī) by fellow residents, he is a patrolling police officer and always sighted the battle between Ultraman Ginga and the DarkLived monsters, not knowing their tie to Hikaru and his friends until the middle of the series. While patrolling, he likes singing the school's song, which became useful in the final episode as it allows everyone to resist against Dark Lugiel. He is portrayed by Shohei Uno (宇野 祥平, Uno Shōhei).
- Yamada (山田; 1, 2, 11) and Kimura (木村; 1, 2, 11): A pair of truck drivers, the two were known for littering garbage around the mountains. This allows Alien Valkie to manipulate their hearts into Thunder Darambia, until Hikaru as Ultraman Ginga stopped them. In the final episode, the duo had regretted their past actions and worked as botanists to decorate the city. They are portrayed by Kazuhiko Kanayama (金山 一彦, Kanayama Kazuhiko) and Norikatsu Kodama (兒玉 宣勝, Kodama Norikatsu) respectively.
- Yagami (矢神; 2, 11): A Furuhoshi Elementary School graduate, Yagami is a biker that likes bullying town residents. His darkness was manipulated by Alien Valkie into Kemur-Man to attack Misuzu until he was stopped by Hikaru, later returned to himself by Ultraman Ginga. In the final episode, he redeemed from his past acts and wants to go globe-throttling with his bike. He is portrayed by Takahiro Kuroishi (黒石 高大, Kuroishi Takahiro).
- Yūka Sugō (菅生 ユウカ, Sugō Yūka; 3, 11): A long time friend of Kenta and Chigusa, Yūka wants to become a fashion designer but she falls into despair when she realises that her dream may crumble, causing her to become an arsonist. She met Kenta and Chigusa in their way to buy fireworks and tricks Kenta into bringing to Hikaru's room for photo shooting, only for her to have been already manipulated by Alien Valkie and turned into King Pandon. After Ginga reverted her to normal, she revealed that her true darkness is loneliness. In the final episode, she redeems from her past acts and continues to become a fashion designer without a worry in her sight. She is portrayed by Mika Kimura (木村 深華, Kimura Mika).
- Gō Ōsato (大里 剛, Ōsato Gō; 7-11): A childhood friend of Taichi and a professional boxer, earning the nickname Mad Dog Ōsato (マッドドッグ大里, Maddo Doggu Ōsato). However, he was caught in a gambling incident and his despair over his dream crushed allows Gray to manipulate his evil heart as Dark Galberos. After Ginga defeated him, Gō helps Hikaru and his team to defend against Gray and in the finale, he decided to restart his career as a professional boxer without regarding the previous incident. He is portrayed by Mitsuki Koga (虎牙 光揮, Koga Mitsuki).

== UPG ==
The Ultra Party Guardians, abbreviated as UPG, is an attack team under the International Defense Organization, whose main goal is to fight against monster threats and studying the Victorium crystals. Their main base of operation is the Live Base (ライブベース, Raibu Bēsu), which is situated in Shizukugaoka. During the season climax, the International Defense Organization fired all of its members and took possession of the Victorium Cannon in hopes of exploiting the Victorium energies until the base was converted into Vict Lugiel after a revived Dark Lugiel combined with it. In Ginga S The Movie, another Live Base was created a year after the previous one's destruction but in Shin Ultraman Retsuden, the base's command center sport another appearance, which took on the similar one to that of SSSP's base from Ultraman. Their main catchphrase is "Got It!" (ガレット, Garetto) when receiving orders. The team's arsenal includes Smart Ceaver (スマートシーバー, Sumāto Shībā), a handheld communicator which can also serve as a starting key for the UPG vehicles and an energy pistol called Charge Gun (チャージガン, Chāji Gan).

=== Members ===
- Yoshiaki Jinno (陣野 義昭, Jinno Yoshiaki): UPG captain. Jinno is a calm and pacifist captain. He is aware of Hikaru's relation with Ultraman Ginga and reveals this in episode 14. Later, when Koyama took charge of UPG and their ultimate weapon being stolen by Dark Lugiel, Jinno criticized him for strongly believe in weapons as an answer for peace. He is portrayed by Ryuichi Ohura (大浦 龍宇一, Ōura Ryūichi).
- Arisa Sugita (杉田 アリサ, Sugita Arisa): Female member of UPG. She has an abnormal strength level that allows her to get on par with Android One-Zero. Arisa is mainly in charge for the preparations of UPG vehicles, Schnauzer and Malamute and has a running gag of punching Gouki whenever she felt stressed out. She was once a member of the International Defense Organization, being the main reason she retained her position when Koyama took over the team and fired almost all members. She is portrayed by Yukari Taki (滝 裕可里, Taki Yukari).
- Gouki Matsumoto (松本 ゴウキ, Matsumoto Gōki): A Karate expert, he is in charge of the field combat. He is welcoming towards newer members of UPG and treats them very well as a senior. In episode 12, he was revealed to be a huge fan of Chigusa. He is portrayed by Takahiro Kato (加藤 貴宏, Katō Takahiro).
- Mana (マナ): Originally Android One-Zero (アンドロイド・ワンゼロ, Andoroido Wan Zero), Exceller's android enforcer and the secondary antagonist of the first half of Ultraman Ginga S. She was tasked by her master to steal the Victoriums to revive Dark Lugiel and with the Chibull Spark, it allows her to MonsLive with Spark Dolls. During the first half, she was commanded by her master to commit a kamikaze attack by exploding in the UPG Live Base but was stopped by Shou while the UPG members were busy reviving Ultraman Ginga and Victory. She became a deserter in the second half but Misuzu, Hikaru's childhood friend encourages her to turn over a new leaf, and she does so by renaming herself Mana. She watches over Ginga and Victory's battle over the second half and in the finale, she fakes her betrayal by pretending to serve Exceller again, and sabotages Vict Lugiel's inner system for the Ultras to finish him at the cost of her own. However, her imprints and memories were rescued by Tomoya, which allows him to rebuild Mana as she becomes one of the members of UPG. She is portrayed by Moga Mogami (最上 もが, Mogami Moga) and is a tribute to Zero-One, an android from episode 9 of Ultraseven.

=== Vehicles ===
- UPG-EV1 Schnauzer (シュナウザー, Shunauzā): A Nissan Leaf-based patrol car, which is frequently shown in the series. This car can also be auto-piloted by moving itself towards the driver via the use of Smart Ceaver. By connecting its engine to the Charge Gun, it would turn into Hyper Laser (ハイパーレーザー, Haipā Rēzā), which allowed UPG officers to fire a stronger beam attacks, successfully gigantic opponents such as Chiburoid-controlled Inpelaizers.
- UPG-EV2 Malamute (マラミュート, Maramyūto): A Nissan NV200-based patrol minivan which first appeared in episode 14 of Ginga S. It serve as an alternative computer to the UPG after their Live Base were seized by International Defense Organization and later by Exceller's army.

== International Defense Organization ==
International Defense Organization (国際防衛機構, Kokusai Bōei Kikō) is a military organization behind UPG's foundation. Their main objective is to exploit the Victorium's powers for military purposes, and has no qualms in killing an Ultra Warrior, believing them to be equal threat to a monster. This was however stopped when the Victorium Cannon they had built was exploited by Dark Lugiel.

- Masaki Koyama (神山 政紀, Kōyama Masaki; 13-16 (Ginga S)): The secretary of the International Defense Organization and old friend of Arisa, he took over the UPG and fired all members but Arisa in order to initiate the Victorium Cannon, which functions by usurping the Victorium as a weapon. He believes that UPG's modus operandi were less effective and thinks of weapons as an answer for peace. However, when it fallen into the hands of Victor Lugiel, he fell into despair after having realised the error of his ways. He is portrayed by Kohki Okada (岡田 浩暉, Okada Kōki).

== Shizukugaoka residents ==
Shizukugaoka (雫が丘) is a fictional town and the main setting in Ultraman Ginga S. The town is known for its constant development in the urban area and is actually the original location of the Victorian people before moving underground, thus explaining the surfacing of Victorium Crystal in said place. The reason of UPG being formed in this area is due to the wish of International Defense Organization planning to exploit the Victorium before the plan was cancelled due to Exceller, later Dark Lugiel exploiting their weapon.

- Shiori (詩織; 5, 16 (Ginga S)): A pregnant woman that Gouki encountered while he fights against Yapool's influence. He soon drives a car and tries to bring her to a hospital before Yapool could kill her. Soon after Vict Lugiel's destruction, she safely gives birth to a child. She is portrayed by Mio Yoneda (米田 弥央, Yoneda Mio).
- Yoshida (吉田; 11 (Ginga S)): A salaryman who was trapped in the form of Gan-Q after being forced to become one via Alien Akumania Muerte's influence and its Spark Doll. Yoshida as Gan-Q helped a local boy named Satoru to ride a bike before being controlled by Muerte in a rampaging spree. After Muerte's destruction, Yoshida was brought to normal and happily witnessed Satoru riding his bike. He is portrayed by Yasuhi Nakamura (中村 靖日, Nakamura Yasuhi).
- Satoru (サトル; 11 (Ginga S)): A local boy who was taught to ride a bike with the help of Yoshida, who at that time trapped in the form of Gan-Q. Satoru has no problems with accepting Yoshida despite the man's gruesome appearance feared several citizen he came across. After Ginga Strium returned Yoshida to his original appearance, Satoru keeps Gan-Q's Spark Doll as a memento. He is portrayed by Raiki Komino (小美野 来希, Komino Raiki).

== Victorian ==
The Victorian (ビクトリアン, Bikutorian) are an ancient race that lived in an underground civilization where there is no day or night. To compensate for the lack of sunlight, Victoriums were used as source of light, albeit similar in a manner of lightstones. The concept of money also seemed never existed in their culture as shown in episode 3, where Lepi attempted to trade a chocolate wafer with an apple at a shop. However, they are also capable of displaying psionic abilities, hinting that they are Espers.

- Queen Kisara (キサラ女王, Kisara-joō): The queen and a priestess of the Victorian, Kisara desired peace amongst Victorian and all lifeforms. When the Victorium theft had been reported, she sent Sho to the surface in hopes to reclaim them. She is portrayed by Mirai Yamamoto (山本 未來, Yamamoto Mirai).
- Sakuya (サクヤ): Sho's childhood friend who serves Kisara. She and Lepi always sneaked out from the Victorian kingdom to the surface, much to his dismay as he concerns about their safety. Sakuya was employed into the UPG as the representatives for the Victorians in the human society. She is portrayed by Rina Koike (小池 里奈, Koike Rina).
- Lepi (レピ, Repi): Sakuya's little brother, Lepi develops curiosity for Earth culture and with Sakuya always sneak out until Sho gave them the permission to do so. He is portrayed by Hinata Yamada (山田 日向, Yamada Hinata).
- Kamushin (カムシン): Kisara's adviser. While seemingly weak, he is incredibly fast in thinking and fighting with his personal katana, which was kept hidden in his walking stick. He is portrayed by Yôsuke Saitô (斉藤 洋介, Saitō Yōsuke)
- Hiyori (ヒヨリ; 6, 7, 13, 16 (Ginga S)): A rogue Victorian, long ago in her childhood during the Victorian civil war, she was banned to another dimension with other opposing group that wanted the use of Victory Lancer. She returned and was given the Chibull Spark that allowed her to become Gomora in order to enact her revenge but developed a change of heart when Shepherdon, her childhood friend protected her. She is portrayed by Meiku Harukawa (春川 芽生, Harukawa Meiku) and Naho Honma (本間 菜穂, Honma Naho) in her childhood.

== Spark Dolls ==
Spark Dolls (スパークドール, Supāku Dōru) are the embodiments of Ultramen and other Ultra Monsters. All of them were known for being combatants of the Dark Spark Wars until they were cursed into said figures by the battle's orchestrator, Dark Lugiel. Eventually after floating in space, they fall into the Furuhoshi Town's mountainside as meteor shower. While some of them were collected by Dark Lugiel, others still scattered around the woods. A few Spark Dolls like Ultraman Taro are. Through the power of Dark Lugiel's Dark Spark and its replicates, the Dark Dummy Sparks, it allows the user to become one with the Spark Dolls through DarkLive (ダークライブ, Dākuraibu), or in certain cases, can also corrupt one should the Spark Doll is an Ultraman or any other Ultra. Eventually after Lugiel's demise, the Spark Dolls were freed from the curse and returns to space.

Two years later, Alien Chibull Exceller revealed to have his own set of Spark Dolls, but never shown on how did he acquired them.

After the end of Ultra Fight Victory, which was Ginga's last succeeding series, a new Ultra Series was released under the name Ultraman X. In said series, it also reused the Spark Doll concept despite different in origin.

== Ultras ==
=== Ultraman Ginga ===
Ultraman Ginga and the Ginga Spark.

Ultraman Ginga (ウルトラマンギンガ, Urutoraman Ginga) is the titular Ultra of the series. Hailed from the future, he and Dark Lugiel were originally a single celestial entity. However, their contradicting ideas and point of view towards life forms (Lugiel sees them as threats while Ginga sees them as part of the universe) had made them split, with Lugiel bearing the darkness and Ginga bearing the light. Ultraman Ginga arrived late to stop Lugiel as he had successfully frozen the Ultras Heroes and the Ultra Monsters into Spark Doll as the fight between the two ended in a tie, causing Ginga to be imprisoned in Spark Doll and Lugiel weakened. His main weapon, the Ginga Spark (ギンガスパーク, Ginga Supāku) became the sacred item that worshipped by Hotsuma Raido and later picked Hikaru as his human host due to his hidden potential. After Ginga defeated the revived Dark Lugiel in the final episode, he advised Hikaru to go on an adventure and he will return once his job accomplished, as he went to space with the freed life forms. He returned again in the extra episode to assist Kenta (Ultraman Tiga) and Chigusa (Ultraman) against Alien Magma and Zetton. Later, he safely returned Kenta and Chigusa to Earth while Alien Magma and Zetton seek apprenticeship in the Ultra Warrior, to which the latter agreed.

Ginga's combat tactic mainly revolves around hand-to-hand combat, but starting from his fight with Dark Lugiel and so on, he also utilized the Ginga Spark Lance (ギンガスパークランス, Ginga Supāku Ransu), a yari which was the combat form of Ginga Spark. He has seven finishers, all depending on the color of his full body Crystals:

- Ginga Cross Shoot (ギンガクロスシュート, Ginga Kurosu Shūto): Ginga's traditional L-style beam finisher fired from his right arm when his crystals shine blue.
- Ginga Thunderbolt (ギンガサンダーボルト, Ginga Sandā Boruto): as his crystals glow yellow, Ginga creates a disc of electricity, which he throws at his opponent.
- Ginga Fireball (ギンガファイヤーボール, Ginga Faiyābōru): Ginga summons multiple fireballs around him, which are launched at the opponent. When used, his crystals shine red.
- Ginga Saber (ギンガセイバー, Ginga Seibā): Ginga's crystals shine white, allowing him to form an energy beam from his right arm. He can strike into the ground with the blade, creating shockwaves.
- Ginga Comfort (ギンガコンフォート, Ginga Konfōto): Ginga releases a calming shower of light particles from his right hand, which can revert the opponent to their Spark Doll state. When performing this technique, Ginga's crystals glow green.
- Ginga Slash (ギンガスラッシュ, Ginga Surasshu): Ginga launches multiple light blades from the crystal on his head. His crystals glow purple.
- Ginga Sunshine (ギンガサンシャイン, Ginga Sanshain): Ginga launches a powerful energy beam from his hands as his crystals glow pink.
- Ginga Especially (ギンガエスペシャリー, Ginga Esupesharī): Ginga's strongest attack, which launches an energy wave from his entire body as his crystals glow with rainbow-colored light.

Ultraman Ginga Strium

In Ginga S, Ginga returns to Earth after Exceller made his move to revive Dark Lugiel. He achieved the form Ultraman Ginga Strium (ウルトラマンギンガストリウム, Urutoraman Ginga Sutoriumu) with the help of Taro, who loaned the Ultra Brothers' powers to him. He also receives an aid from Victory, an Ultra that native to the Earth. But as the battle against Exceller and Lugiel ended once more, he loses the form again and returned to space. As Ginga Strium, Ginga is considered a Super Ultraman (スーパーウルトラマン, Sūpā Urutoraman) combination (due to the use of Strium Brace/Ultraman Taro); his ability perimeters is heightened to be on par with that of Victory, possessing enhanced ESP and his fighting stance replicated that of Taro. Although retaining his original attacks, Ginga is capable of using the finishers of all six Ultra Brothers and utilize Cosmo Miracle Ray (コスモミラクル光線, Kosumo Mirakuru Kōsen) by combining their attacks. His loaned power from the Ultra Brothers are:

- Ultraman: Specium Ray (スペシウム光線, Supeshiumu Kōsen), Ultra Slash (ウルトラスラッシュ, Urutora Surasshu)
- Zoffy: M87 Ray (M87光線, Emu Hachijū-nana Kōsen), Z-Ray (Z光線, Zetto Kōsen)
- Ultraseven: Wide Shot (ワイドショット, Waido Shotto), Emerium Ray (エメリウム光線, Emeriumu Kōsen)
- Ultraman Jack: Ultra Shot (ウルトラショット, Urutora Shotto), Ultra Barrier (ウルトラバリヤー, Urutora Bariyā)
- Ultraman Ace: Metallium Ray (メタリウム光線, Metariumu Kōsen), Punch Laser (パンチレーザー, Panchi Rēzā)
- Ultraman Taro: Strium Ray (ストリウム光線, Sutoriumu Kōsen), Blue Laser (ブルーレーザー, Burū Rēzā)

Ultraman Ginga is voiced by Tomokazu Sugita (杉田 智和, Sugita Tomokazu), who also voiced his half, Dark Lugiel. His grunts in the series were provided by Takuya Negishi, Hikaru's actor, although Sugita did perform his own variation of Ultraman Ginga's grunt in episode 155 of Shin Ultraman Retsuden. The Ginga Spark is voiced by Yoshihisa Kawahara (川原 慶久, Kawahara Yoshihisa).

=== Ultraman Victory ===
Ultraman Victory (ウルトラマンビクトリー, Urutorman Bikutorī) is the ancient Ultra and protector of the Victorian. He is stored inside the Victory Lancer (ビクトリーランサー, Bikutorī Ransā) and utilized by Sho in order to fight against Exceller and his minions. Before Sho, there was an unnamed user who used Victory's power to stop Shepherdon from rampaging the Victorian kingdom during the civil war, using Victorium Comfort (ビクトリウムコンフォート, Bikutoriumu Konfōto). Ultraman Victory's performances are comparably higher than that of Ginga. His main finishers are Victorium Shoot (ビクトリウムシュート, Bikutoriumu Shūto) and Victorium Especially (ビクトリウムエスペシャリー, Bikutoriumu Esupesharī). Apart from that, he can perform UlTrans (ウルトランス, Urutoransu), which allows him to manifest a Spark Doll's power through his right hand. Among them are:

- EX Red King Knuckle (EXレッドキングナックル, Ī Ekkusu Reddo Kingu Nakkuru): A gigantic fist knuckle themed after EX Red King's right arm. It allows Ultraman Victory to replicate the monster's own Flame Road.
- Eleking Tail (エレキングテイル, Erekingu Teiru): A whip themed after Eleking's Tail, Victory can use it to constrain enemies and delivers electric-based attacks.
- King Joe Launcher (キングジョーランチャー, Kingu Jō Ranchā): An arm cannon themed after King Joe Custom's Pedanium Launcher, which allows him to launch rapid-fire energy bullets.
- Gudon Whip (グドンウィップ, Gudon Wippu): A whip themed after Gudon's whip arms, it allows Victory to use whip-based attacks.
- Sadola Scissors (サドラシザーズ, Sadora Shizāzu): Sadola's pincer arms, it also gives Victory the ability to elongate his arms.
- Shepherdon Saber (シェパードンセイバー, Shepādon Seibā): A sword themed after Shepherdon itself, Victory is capable of using Victorium-themed attacks and initiate Shepherdon Saber Flash (シェパードンセイバーフラッシュ, Shepādon Seibā Furasshu), his strongest attack.
- Hyper Zetton Scissors (ハイパーゼットンシザーズ, Haipā Zetton Shizāzu): An arm themed after that of Hyper Zetton, it allows Victory to replicate one of Hyper Zetton's attacks, Dark Fireball (暗黒火球, Ankoku Kakyū).

Ultraman Victory Knight

In Ultra Fight Victory, using the Knight Timbre (ナイトティンバー, Naito Tinbā), a flute/sword made by Ultraman Hikari, Victory can turn himself into Ultraman Victory Knight (ウルトラマンビクトリーナイト, Urutoraman Bikutorī Naito), which allows him to seal darkness as he was at that time tasked by Hikari to stop Yapool and Juda. This weapon functions by drawing out the inner Victorium of Sho and manifested it through Victory. The Knight Timbre's main ability is to play the Victorious Melody (勝利のメロディー, Shōri no Merodī), which allows him to manipulate Victorium and briefly resurrected Shepherdon from its Spark Doll. This form has three finishers:

- Knight Victorium Flash (ナイトビクトリウムフラッシュ, Naito Bikutoriumu Furasshu)
- Knight Victorium Break (ナイトビクトリウムブレイク, Naito Bikutoriumu Bureiku): Used in conjunction with Shepherdon Saber.
- Knight Victorium Shoot (ナイトビクトリウムシュート, Naito Bikutoriumu Shūto)

Ultraman Victory is voiced by Kiyotaka Uji, Sho's actor.

=== Ultraman Gingavictory ===
Ultraman Gingavictory (ウルトラマンギンガビクトリー, Urutoraman Gingabikutorī) is the fusion initiated by both Ultramen Ginga and Victory. It was made when Hikaru and Sho performed the Ultra Touch (ウルトラタッチ, Urutora Tatchi), and scans the Ultra Fusion Brace (ウルトラフュージョンブレス, Urutora Fyūjon Buresu) to the Victory Lancer. It was first shown during the Ultraman Ginga S: Showdown! Ultra 10 Warriors!!, which made after Hikaru and Sho were trained by Ultraman Zero to cooperate. Gingavictory first defeated a gigantic copy of Dark Lugiel and joined the other Ultra Warriors in fighting Etelgar. After Cosmos rescued Alena, Gingavictory launched an all-out attack on Etelgar and pursued him to space before defeating him for good. It was accessed again in Ultra Fight Victory to fight against Yapool, although the latter managed to revive Juda in his dying breath. However, the fusion did not last longer when Super Grand King Spectre attacked them, forcing him to split.

Being a Super Ultraman, his powers and ESP-based techniques are heightened beyond normal and retains the abilities from his two components, such as Ginga's telepathic contact and Victory's UlTrans. His strongest attack is Gingavictory Breaker (ギンガビクトリーブレイカー, Gingabikutorī Bureikā), which allows him to destroy even the most gigantic opponents. Apart from that, he also possess the powers of past 8 Heisei Ultras and combining their powers to perform Ultra Fusion Shoot (ウルトラフュージョンシュート, Urutora Fyūjon Shūto):

- Ultraman Tiga, Dyna and Gaia (can be used all three at once): Zeperion Ray (ゼペリオン光線, Zeperion Kōsen), Solgent Ray (ソルジェント光線, Sorujento Kōsen), Photon Edge (フォトンエッジ, Foton Ejji)
- Ultraman Cosmos: Full Moon Rect (フルムーンレクト, Furu Mūn Rekuto), Cosmium Ray (コズミューム光線, Kozumyūmu Kōsen)
- Ultraman Nexus: Cross-Ray Storm (クロスレイ・シュトローム, Kurosu Rei Shutorōmu), Over-Ray Storm (オーバーレイ・シュトローム, Ōbā Rei Shutorōmu)
- Ultraman Max: Maxium Cannon (マクシウムカノン, Makushiumu Kanon), Galaxy Cannon (ギャラクシーカノン, Gyarakushī Kanon)
- Ultraman Mebius: Mebium Shoot (メビュームシュート, Mebiūmu Shūto), Mebium Burst (メビュームバースト, Mebiūmu Bāsuto)
- Ultraman Zero: Wide Zero Shot (ワイドゼロショット, Waido Zero Shoto), Emerium Slash (エメリウムスラッシュ, Emeriumu Surasshu)

Ultraman Gingavictory is voiced by Takuya Negishi and Kiyotaka Uji.

=== Ultra Brothers ===
The Ultra Brothers (ウルトラ兄弟, Urutora Kyōdai) (Note: Also called by many as Ultra 6 Brothers (ウルトラ6兄弟, Urutora Roku Kyōdai)) is a team of six legendary Showa Ultramen that have protected the peace of planet Earth and space. They were also the participants of the Dark Spark Wars and all of them fallen as they had tried to protect the youngest member, Taro from the wave, making him the only sentient Spark Doll in the series. Of course, following Lugiel's defeat, they were released from the curse and returned to their original forms. In Ultraman Ginga S, as Taro headed to Earth after detecting a new threat, his Ultra Brother comrades loaned him their powers as a sign of support until the final episode, where Taro's mission on Earth had done, as the borrowed powers had been returned to their rightful owners.

- Zoffy (ゾフィー, Zofī): The leader of the Ultra Brothers. He contributed his M87 Ray and Z-Ray to Taro in Ginga S.
- Ultraman (ウルトラマン, Urutoraman; 8, 9, 10, EX, Ginga Theatre Special Battle Royale, Mountain Peanuts Novel): See here
- Ultraseven (ウルトラセブン, Urutorasebun; 8, 9, 10, Ginga Movie 2): See here
- Ultraman Jack (ウルトラマンジャック, Urutoraman Jakku): See here.
- Ultraman Ace (ウルトラマンエース, Urutoraman Eisu; Fight Victory): He contributed his Metallium Ray and Punch Laser to Taro in Ginga S. Later in Ultra Fight Victory, he was among the Ultras sent by Ultraman King to stop Yapool from reviving Juda. Learning that Yapool had Ace-Killer taken care of his captive, Ginga, Ace tried to rescue him but overpowered after the Ace-Killer he fought turned out to be Victory-Killer. He was healed by Victory Knight after the latter rescued Ginga and helps by fighting Super Grand King Spectre. In Ultra Fight Victory, he is voiced by Keiji Takamine (高峰 圭二, Takamine Keiji).
- Ultraman Taro: See above

==== New Ultra 5 Brothers ====
New Ultra 5 Brothers (新ウルトラ5兄弟, Shin Urutora Gō Kyōdai) is a so-called "Ultra Brother" team consisting of fake Spark Dolls lived by Tomoya (Ultraman), Kenta (Ultraseven), Chigusa (Ultraman Tiga), Misuzu (Ultraman Taro) and Hikaru (Ultraman Ginga). Originally trying to fight each other over the strongest Ultra Warrior, they united against the Bug Ray evil Ultra Warriors in order to escape the virtual reality.

=== Other Showa Ultras ===
- Father of Ultra (ウルトラの父, Urutora no Chichi; 5, 11 (Ginga)): The father of Ultraman Taro, he was also a victim of the Dark Spark, having tried to protect his son from Dark Lugiel. While Taro descended into despair, Father of Ultra encouraged him not to give up, allowing Taro to regain his confidence and had the Furuhoshi Town residents to support him in against Dark Lugiel. He is voiced by Holly Kaneko (金子 はりい, Kaneko Harii), who would later voice Alien Guts "Vorst" in Ultraman Ginga S.
- Mother of Ultra (ウルトラの母, Urutora no Haha; 5, 11 (Ginga)): The mother of Ultraman Taro, she was also a victim of the Dark Spark, having tried to protect her son from Dark Lugiel. While Taro descended into despair, Mother of Ultra encouraged him not to give up, allowing Taro to regain his confidence and had the Furuhoshi Town residents to support him in against Dark Lugiel. She is voiced by Miki Ōtani (大谷 美紀, Ōtani Miki).
- Ultraman Leo (ウルトラマンレオ, Urutoraman Reo; Ginga S Movie, Fight Victory): The royal prince and a survivor from the destruction of Nebula L-77, Leo was commanded by Ultraman King to stop Yapool from reviving Juda. He is the teacher of Ultraman Zero and learns about Ultraman Ginga and Victory from him. During the climax of the Ultra Fight Victory, he and several Ultras left behind to fight Super Grand King Spectre while Victory Knight pursued Juda Spectre. He is voiced by Ryu Manatsu (真夏 竜, Manatsu Ryū).
- Astra (アストラ, Asutora; Ginga S Movie, Fight Victory): Leo's younger brother and a survivor from the destruction of Nebula L-77, Astra was commanded by Ultraman King to stop Yapool from reviving Juda. Like Leo, he is also a teacher of Ultraman Zero and learns about Ultraman Ginga and Victory from him. During the climax of the Ultra Fight Victory, he and several Ultras left behind to fight Super Grand King Spectre while Victory Knight pursued Juda Spectre. He is voiced by Chikara Ōsaka (逢坂 力, Ōsaka Chikara).
- Ultraman King (ウルトラマンキング, Urutoraman Kingu; Ginga S Movie, Fight Victory): The godlike figure of the Land of Light, during the Ultraman Ginga S Movie, he requested Ultraman Zero to give the Ultra Fusion Brace to Ultraman Ginga and Victory to assist them. In Ultra Fight Victory, he sensed a great disturbance in the space, knowing that Yapool attempted to revive Juda. He soon sent four Ultras, Ace, Leo, Astra and Hikari to stop him.

=== Past Heisei Ultras and Ultra hosts ===
- Ultraman Tiga (ウルトラマンティガ, Urutoraman Tiga; 5, 6, Ginga Theatre, 10, Ginga Theatre 2 (Ginga), Ginga S Movie): See here
- Ultraman Dyna (ウルトラマンダイナ, Urutoraman Daina; Ginga S Movie): During the events of Ultraman Ginga S Movie, he was among the Heisei Ultras that held captive by Etelgar until the UPG members freed them. While the other Heisei Ultras make way to Etelgar's tower, Dyna, Tiga and Gaia left behind to fight against Five King. He assumed Miracle Type (ミラクルタイプ, Mirakuru Taipu) and finished Five King with Revolium Wave (レボリウムウェーブ, Reboriumu Uēbu) before joining the others and using Solgent Ray (ソルジェント光線, Sorujento Kōsen) to destroy Etelgar's castle. In the Ginga S Movie, he is voiced by Takeshi Tsuruno (つるの 剛士, Tsuruno Takeshi).
- Ultraman Gaia (ウルトラマンガイア, Urutoraman Gaia; Ginga S Movie): During the events of Ultraman Ginga S Movie, he was among the Heisei Ultras that held captive by Etelgar until the UPG members freed them. While the other Heisei Ultras make way to Etelgar's tower, Gaia, Tiga and Dyna left behind to fight against Five King. He assumed Supreme Version (スプリームヴァージョン, Supurīmu Vājon) and uses Photon Stream (フォトンストリーム, Foton Sutorīmu) to destroy Five King before joining the others and uses Quantum Stream (クァンタムストリーム, Kwantamu Sutorīmu) In the Ginga S Movie, he is voiced by Takeshi Yoshioka (吉岡 毅志, Yoshioka Takeshi).
- Musashi Haruno/Ultraman Cosmos (春野 ムサシ/ウルトラマンコスモス, Haruno Musashi/Urutoraman Kosumosu; Ginga S Movie): During the events of Ultraman Ginga S Movie, Cosmos was Etelgar's recent victim of petrifaction. The separated Musashi managed to escape and join forces with UPG to rescue the demon's captives, He and Gingavictory managed to get at the top of Etelgar's castle and Cosmos purified Alena from Etelgar's brainwashing. As the event was over, Cosmos return Arena to her hoemworld. In the Ginga S Movie, he is portrayed by Taiyo Sugiura (杉浦 太陽, Sugiura Taiyō).
- Ultraman Nexus (ウルトラマンネクサス, Urutoraman Nekusasu; Ginga S Movie): See here
- Ultraman Max (ウルトラマンマックス, Urutoraman Makkusu; Ginga S Movie): During the events of Ultraman Ginga S Movie, he was among the Heisei Ultras that held captive by Etelgar until the UPG members freed them. While the other Heisei Ultras make way to Etelgar's tower, he was forced to left behind to fight against Alien Sran. In the Ginga S Movie, he is voiced by Kenta Matsumoto, who previously voiced the young Taro and Thunder Darambia in Ginga.
- Ultraman Mebius (ウルトラマンメビウス, Urutoraman Mebiusu; Ginga S Movie): See here
- Ultraman Hikari (ウルトラマンヒカリ, Urutoraman Hikari): A scientist of the Land of Light and a member of Space Garrison, he was partnered with Mebius during his time on Earth. In Ultra Fight Victory, he was among the Ultras sent by Ultraman King to stop Juda. He invented the Knight Timbre as a weapon to seal Juda and bestow it to Ultraman Victory along with his task after rescuing him from Aribunta. Once Juda had been destroyed and the stolen Victorium returned, Hikari decided to leave the Knight Timbre in Sho's possession and leaves, confidently believing that the Earth's future is safe with them. His main weapon is the Knight Brace (ナイトブレス, Naito Buresu), which allow him to use the Knight Blade (ナイトブレード, Naito Burēdo) and Knight Shoot (ナイトシュート, Naito Shūto). He is voiced by Keiichi Nanba (難波 圭一, Nanba keiichi).
- Ultraman Zero (ウルトラマンゼロ, Urutoraman Zero; Ginga S Movie): See here

== Supporting heroes, monsters, and aliens ==
=== Jean-Nine ===
Jean-Nine (ジャンナイン, Jan Nain; Ginga, Ginga Theater Special) is a mecha robot belonging to Tomoya. One of the casualties of the Dark Spark War, it landed on Lugiel's hands and was given to the youth, corrupted back into Jean-Killer (ジャンキラー, Jan Kirā) by the boy's darkness of being a dream hater. Eventually, after Ginga destroyed the Dark Dummy Spark and for Tomoya's dream to surpass Ginga, Jean-Killer was purified once again into Jean-Nine, assisting Ginga in his battles. Followed by Dark Lugiel's demise, Jean-Nine and the rest of the Spark Dolls were freed and bids farewell to Tomoya, indicated by the word "GOODBYE FRIEND" emblazoned on the Gunpad.

Compared to its incarnation in Ultraman Zero Gaiden: Killer the Beatstar, this Jean-Nine is mute and rarely communicates with Tomoya via the words on his Gunpad. This Jean-Nine also possess several abilities that differs from its M78 incarnation. Among them are the ability to transform into a fighter jet called Jean-Star (ジャンスター, Jan Sutā) and possess threads on its back. Its finisher is the Jean Stardust (ジャンスターダスト, Jan Sutādasuto), which allows Jean-Nine to summon a giant-sized Gunpad and fires continuous bullets which is strong enough to destroy a giant.

=== Shepherdon ===
Underground Sacred Beast Shepherdon (地底聖獣 シェパードン, Chitei Seijū Shepādon; Ginga S, Fight Victory) is an underground monster and the protector of the Victorians and the Victoriums. Long ago, during the Victorian's civil war, Shepherdon wreak havoc as a side effect from the battle, however, Ultraman Victory managed to calm the monster and the war was forgotten from everyone's memories. Shepherdon assist Victory multiple times in his battle, and reunited with Hiyori, its old friend but loses its life by Vorst/Verokron. However, its remains reconstitute into Crystal Spark Dolls (クリスタルスパークドールズ, Kurisutaru Supāku Dōruzu), allowing it to assist Victory even if his life had already ended.

In Ultra Fight Victory, Shepherdon was briefly revived by Victory Knight via the Knight Timbre, assisting it to attack Victory-Killer and Lunaticks. Before returning to a Spark Doll once more, the monster replenished the energies of Ultraman Ginga and Ace.

Shepherdon's main ability is to launch energy attacks from its mouth. Its Victorium Crystal is 10 times stronger than normal Victorium and it allowed Shepherdon to utilize its strongest attack, Shepherdon Victorium Flash (シェパードンビクトリウムフラッシュ, Shepādon Bikutoriumu Furasshu).

=== Jace ===
Hallucination Alien Alien Metron "Jace" (幻覚宇宙人 メトロン星人 ジェイス, Genkaku Uchūjin Metoron Seijin Jeisu; 12, 16 (Ginga S)) is an alien who defected from Exceller after he was sent to turn humans violent. Living under his human form "Tanba" (丹葉), he becomes a fan of Chigusa Kuno and saves her from Vorst after the latter was sent to capture Jace. He willingly puts himself under UPG's custody but runs away to save Chigusa and becomes giant, teaming up with Ultramen Ginga Strium and Victory to defeat Vorst/Zoa-Muruchi. Jace was released by UPG to rejoin the human society and was seen again supporting Chigusa's performance during Vict Lugiel's attack.

Jace/Tanba is portrayed and voiced by Kohei Shiotsuka (しおつか こうへい, Shiotsuka Kōhei) and his race first appeared in episode 8 of Ultraseven.

== Antagonists ==
=== Dark Lugiel ===
Darkness Demon Dark Lugiel (暗黒の魔神 ダークルギエル, Ankoku no Majin Dāku Rugieru) (Note: Originally called as "Arm of the Variant" (異形の手のモノ, Igyō no Te no Mono) before his grand appearance in final episode.) is the main antagonist in Ultraman Ginga and the final villain in Ultraman Ginga S. Hailed from the future, he and Ultraman Ginga were originally a single celestial entity. However, their contradicting ideas and point of view towards life forms (Lugiel sees them as threats while Ginga sees them as part of the universe) had made them split, with Lugiel bearing the darkness and Ginga bearing the light. Dark Lugiel orchestrated the Dark Spark Wars, with Ginga arrived late to stop Lugiel as he had successfully frozen the Ultras Heroes and the Ultra Monsters into Spark Doll and the fight between the two ended in a tie, causing Ginga to be imprisoned in Spark Doll and Lugiel weakened. His main weapon, the Dark Spark (ダークスパーク, Dāku Supāku) allows him to turn any being into Spark Doll or corrupt one. Following the tie of his battle, he was imprisoned in the Dark Spark and falls to the mount of Furuhoshi. He possessed Kyōko Shirai to absorb her and her former students' darkness in order to revive himself. By collecting fallen Spark Dolls on the mountain, he utilized several of them as his minions to distribute the Dark Dummy Sparks (ダークダミースパーク, Dāku Damī Supāku) to corrupted individuals, allowing him to feed their darkness and revive himself. He reveals himself in the final episode of the series, destroying the school area and easily overpowering Ginga before he faced against Taro, who would later revive Ginga's strength. Their heated battle was further brought to the moon where he met his demise, thus lifting the curse he placed on the Spark Dolls.

Unfortunately two years later in Ginga S, his body was sought by Exceller in order to invade the Earth. Lugiel was revived as Ultra Roaring Monster Vict Lugiel (超咆哮獣 ビクトルギエル, Chō Hōkō-jū Bikuto Rugieru) and seemingly served Exceller until he betrayed him and restarted his plan to freeze all lifeforms. He was finally killed again by the combined forces of Ultraman Ginga Strium and Ultraman Victory.

Dark Lugiel's combat weapon is the Dark Spark Lance (ダークスパークランス, Dāku Supāku Ransu), a yari which is based on Ginga's Ginga Spark Lance. By his own strength, his main attacks are Dark Lugiel Beat (ダークルギエルビート, Dāku Rugieru Bīto) and Dark Lugiel Shoot (ダークルギエルシュート, Dāku Rugieru Shūto), both of which are energy attacks from his own core. As Vict Lugiel, his chest is armed with the Victorium Cannon (ビクトリウム・キャノン, Bikutoriumu Kyanon), through which, he can launch an energy beam called Victorium Shoot (ビクトリウムシュート, Bikutoriumu Shūto).

Dark Lugiel is voiced by Tomokazu Sugita, who also voiced his half, Ultraman Ginga.

=== Dark Agents ===
Supporting antagonists of Ultraman Ginga, Dark Lugiel deploys his dark agents (闇のエージェント, Yami no Ējento) to deliver Dark Dummy Sparks and Spark Dolls to any evil hearted ones in order for their master to feed on their darkness. Upon Lugiel's defeat, they wandered in space until two years later in Ginga S, where they detected their master's revival and returned to Earth. Once arrived, they welcomed Berume and Exceller's Chiburoids to form a legion called Dark Lugiel Rangers (ダークルギエル特戦隊, Dāku Rugieru Tokusentai), as they attack human survivors from Vict Lugiel's assault but defeated by the combined forces of UPG members and Victorians. After the series ended, it was revealed that all of them except Berume and Chiburoids survived the fight but were put under UPG's custody and forced to work as janitors for punishments.

- Space Fisherman Alien Valky (宇宙海人 バルキー星人, Uchū Kaijin Barukī Seijin; 1-6 (Ginga), 16 (Ginga S)): The second dark agent to be awakened, Valky always had the tendency to dance and speak English words. He was defeated by the combination attack of Ginga and Jean-Nine. In episode 8 of Shin Ultraman Retsuden, he is actually revealed to be the same Alien Valky from the last episode of Ultraman Taro instead of another incarnation, having known each other as greatest rivals and even mistake his former host, Kotaro Higashi as Taro himself as well. He is voiced by Tatsuya Hashimoto (橋本 達也, Hashimoto Tatsuya).
- Different Dimension Alien Alien Icarus (異次元宇宙人 イカルス星人, Ijigen Uchūjin Ikarusu Seijin; Ginga Movie, 16 (Ginga S)): The third dark agent to be awakened, he was sent by Lugiel to collect Spark Dolls from the mountains. When Hikaru's group had the same intention, he stole the Spark Dolls they collected and DarkLived with the ones in his possession and himself into Tyrant. After Tyrant's defeat, Icarus was captured and interrogated but Lugiel managed to revert him into a Spark Doll to ensure his existence remain hidden. He is voiced by Tomokazu Seki (関 智一, Seki Tomokazu) and first appeared in episode 10 of Ultraseven.
- Assassin Alien Alien Nackle "Gray" (暗殺宇宙人 ナックル星人 グレイ, Ansatsu Uchūjin Nakkuru Seijin Gurei; 7-11 (Ginga), 16 (Ginga S)): The fourth dark agent to be awakened, Alien Nackle Gray first trapped the Furuhoshi High School, Hikaru's group and almost everyone inside a space time continuum. During this time, he made his master harvesting the darkness of Seiichirō Isurugi and his accomplices, later targeted Misuzu as they DarkLived into Super Grand King, until Hikaru managed to return her to his side and turn both Gray and his monster to Spark Dolls. He is voiced by Kunji Hirano (平野 勲人, Hirano Kunji) and his race first appeared in episode 37 of Return of Ultraman.
- Saber Tyrant Alien Magma (サーベル暴君 マグマ星人, Sāberu Bōkun Maguma Seijin): The first dark agent to be awakened, Alien Magma was actually rejected by Dark Lugiel in favor of Alien Valky. Since then, he tried his best to become worthy to his master but always bested by new minions until his demise. His loneliness became the catalyst for his plan to destroy Japan via Zetton. Until he was stopped by Ultraman Tiga (Kenta), Ultraman (Chigusa) and Ultraman Ginga. After his defeat, Alien Magma and Zetton desired to become Ginga's pupil and the Ultra agrees and brought them away from Earth. He is portrayed by Kōichi Toshima, who would later voice Ultraman Nexus in the Ginga S movie, in his original form and Munetoshi Takubo (田久保 宗稔, Takubo Munetoshi) in his human form. First appeared in episode 1 of Ultraman Leo.

=== Dark Zagi ===
Evil Dark Destruction God Dark Zagi (邪悪なる暗黒破壊神 ダークザギ, Jāku Naru Ankoku Hakai-shin Dāku Zagi) is one of the villains of Ultraman Ginga Theater Special. Long ago, he was one of the victims of Dark Spark War after being released by Dark Lugiel, he proceed to attack Jean-Nine in mad fury until Ginga arrived as they battle on every portions of the world and defeated after returning to Japan. His Spark Doll was retrieved by Dark Lugiel afterwards, but like the rest, was freed, following Lugiel's demise.

Zagi's main attacks are a shockwave punch called the Zagi Punch (ザギ・パンチ, Zagi Panchi) and a super gravity stream called the Gravity Zagi (グラビティ・ザギ, Gurabiti Zagi), while his main finisher is the Lightning Zagi (ライトニング・ザギ, Raitoningu Zagi).

First appeared in episode 37 of Ultraman Nexus and was introduced as an evil mockery/doppelgänger to the series' main Ultraman, Ultraman Noa.

=== Bug Rays ===
Bug Rays (バグレー, Bagurē) were digital copies of five Dark Ultras created from software bugs in Tomoya's Live Pad and were the main antagonist of Ultraman Ginga Theater Special: Ultra Monster Hero Battle Royal!. They interrupted Hikaru and his gang while they were battling over the strongest UltLive, and all of them had been defeated by the teens after clashing their finishers.

- Chaos Ultraman (カオスウルトラマン, Kaosu Urutoraman): A dark replica of Ultraman Cosmos in Corona Mode, which previously appeared in episodes 39, 40 and 59. This Ultraman faces against Hikaru/Ultraman Ginga before being defeated. His finisher is the Dark Bullet (ダークブレット, Dāku Buretto), which is fired in a manner of energy ray instead of light bullet like his original incarnation.
- Evil Tiga (イーヴィルティガ, Īviru Tiga): An evil Ultraman who previously appeared in episode 44 of Ultraman Tiga. He faced against Chigusa/Ultraman Tiga before being defeated. His finisher is the Evil Shot (イーヴィルショット, Īviru Shotto).
- Chaosroid U (カオスロイドU, Kaosuroido Yū): A dark replica of the original Ultraman that first appeared in Ultraman Fighting Evolution Rebirth. He faced against Tomoya/Ultraman before being defeated. His main attacks are Chaos Slash (カオススラッシュ, Kaosu Surasshu) and Chaos Spacium Ray (カオススペシウム光線, Kaosu Supeshiumu Kōsen), both of which are differently portrayed than their game counterparts.
- Chaosroid S (カオスロイドS, Kaosuroido Esu): A dark replica of Ultraseven that first appeared in Ultraman Fighting Evolution Rebirth. He faced against Kenta/Ultraseven before being defeated. His main attacks are ChaoSlugger (カオスラッガー, Kaosuraggā) and a copy of Seven's Wide Shot, the former which is differently portrayed than its game counterpart.
- Chaosroid T (カオスロイドT, Kaosuroido Tī): A dark replica of Ultraman Taro that first appeared in Ultraman Fighting Evolution Rebirth. He faced against Misuzu/Ultraman Taro before being defeated. His main attack is Chaos Strium Ray (カオスストリウム光線, Kaosu Sutoriumu Kōsen).

=== Exceller ===
Brain Alien Alien Chibull "Exceller" (頭脳星人 チブル星人 エクセラー, Zunō Seijin Chiburu Seijin Ekuserā) is the main antagonist of Ultraman Ginga S. Stated to be a Spark Doll "Lived" from unknown source, his intention is to revive Dark Lugiel to seize his power and conquer Earth. He pilots an exosuit called Chibu Loader Strong (チブローダーストロング, Chibu Rōdā Sutorongu) and hired a lot of "Lived" aliens aside from his android enforcer One-Zero and Chiburoids. Should his minions wanted to use his Spark Dolls, he granted them the Chibull Sparks (チブルスパーク, Chiburu Supāku) to manifest their powers.

Near the final, he successfully revived Dark Lugiel and merged with UPG's Live Base into Vict Lugiel. But as it seems that he had the control over it, Dark Lugiel betrayed him by turning him back to a Spark Doll.

Exceller is voiced by Takuya Eguchi (江口 拓也, Eguchi Takuya) and his race first appeared in episode 9 of Ultraseven. While physically portrayed in CGI, several scenes involving him out of his exosuit had Exceller portrayed by puppetry.

==== Exceller's minions ====
These aliens were originally Spark Dolls which brought to life by Exceller's technology and hired as his servants:

- Cloning Alien Alien Guts "Vorst" (分身宇宙人 ガッツ星人 ボルスト, Bunshin Uchūjin Gattsu Seijin Borusuto; 3, 4, 7, 9, 10, 12, 13 (Ginga S)): The supporting antagonist, later promoted to the secondary antagonist in the second half. Self-proclaimed "the strongest alien in space", he is greatly loyal to Exceller and is armed with a Chibull Spark that allows him to use Spark Dolls, being the greatest user of them as he is capable of manifesting his own power. His position in the legion is put at odds with One-Zero, and finally taken over her position in the second half after she became a deserter. In episode 13, after his final attempt to attack the Ultramen failed, he becomes a giant rampaging alien by Exceller and was rescued by Ginga Strium. Vorst gives Ginga Strium the location of Exceller's base and forms a temporary alliance with him to take down the alien before they would fight again. However, before any actions can be made, he was killed by Arisa, who uses the UPG Live Base's Victorium Cannon during its test run. Vorst is voiced by Holly Kaneko, who previously voiced Father of Ultra in Ultraman Ginga, and his race first appeared in episode 39 of Ultraseven.
- Space Demon Alien Akumania "Muerte" (宇宙悪霊 アクマニヤ星人 ムエルテ, Uchū Akuryō Akumaniya Seijin Muerute; 11 (Ginga S)): An alien hired by Exceller. He tried to hypnotize a salaryman named Yoshida into becoming Gan-Q but failed when the MonsLive process render the monster human-sized. After managing to control Yoshida/Gan-Q, they attacked Ginga and Victory but Gan-Q once again broke from his power and hold the alien off for Ginga and Victory to finish. Muerte is voiced by Kiyohiko Ueki (植木 紀世彦, Ueki Kiyohiko), who also portrays his human form, and his race first appeared in episode 33 of Ultraman Leo.
- Transforming Phantom Alien Zetton "Berume" (変身怪人 ゼットン星人 ベルメ, Henshin Kaijin Zetton Seijin Berume; 14, 16 (Ginga S)): An alien that takes over Vorst's position after his death. He appears wearing a golden tuxedo and sent by Exceller to distract Ultramen Ginga Strium and Victory as Hyper Zetton via a Chibull Spark while his forces invade the UPG Live Base. Despite being defeated, he survived and teaming up with Dark Lugiel Rangers to attack the human survivors of Vict Lugiel but was defeated. He was nowhere to be seen afterwards, while the core members were under UPG's custody, becoming janitors as punishments. Berume is voiced by Yūki Ono (小野 友樹, Ono Yūki) and his race first appeared in episode 39 of Ultraman. Previously prior to the premier of Ultraman Ginga S and his voicing as Berume, Yūki Ono was invited as a model to exhibit the UPG uniforms.

==== Chiburoids ====
Marionette Warrior Chiburoid (傀儡戦士 チブロイド, Kugutsu Senshi Chiburoido; Ginga S) (Note: Also called as Marionette Phantom (傀儡怪人, Kugutsu Kaijin).) are Exceller's robot troops. They are usually encased in a spherical ball and uses guns as weapons. If given a Chibull Spark, they use it to MonsLive into Matchless Iron God Inpelaizer (無双鉄神 インペライザー, Musō Tetsujin Inperaizā).

=== Yapool ===
Extradimensional Being Yapool (異次元人 ヤプール, Ijigen-jin Yapūru; 5 (Ginga S), Fight Victory), also known as Extradimensional Terrible-Being Giant Yapool (異次元超人 巨大ヤプール, Ijigen Chōjin Kyodai Yapūru), is an ancient demon and the adversary of the Ultra Brothers. He has been hiding in Exceller's Vakishim Spark Doll and decides to work on his own to defeat the Ultras. His original attempt is to possess Gouki, a UPG officer and attacks several citizens but the latter tried his best to surpass his control until Ginga Strium freed him and killed Yapool with Ultraman Ace's Metallium Ray. He returned as the secondary antagonist of Ultra Fight Victory, where he was revived by his own resentment for Ultramen, stealing the energy of Victorium Core, kidnapping Ginga as his hostage and contemplates to revive Juda. His actions had drawn the attention of Ultraman King, who sent Leo, Astra, Ace and Hikari (later pass the baton to Victory) to stop him. Yapool was killed once again by Ultraman Gingavictory, but he manages to fully revives Juda with his own energy as a final act to enact revenge on them.

Yapool is voiced by Tesshō Genda (玄田 哲章, Genda Tesshō), who reprised his role since Ultraman Mebius and is the same character from Ultraman Ace.

==== Victory-Killer ====
Extradimensional Terrible-Being Victory-Killer (異次元超人 ビクトリーキラー, Ijigen Chōjin Bikutorī Kirā; Fight Victory) is a combat robot made by Yapool. Originally Ace-Killer (エースキラー, Ēsu Kirā) whom Ace fought and defeated at Planet Golgotha, Yapool rebuilt it and upload Victory's battle tactics and was assigned to guard his prisoner, Ginga on Satellite Golgotha. Having defeated its old nemesis, Ultraman Ace, Victory Knight challenged and destroyed it with Knight Victorium Shoot.

While Victory-Killer retained the abilities of past Ultra Brothers, it also gains a twisted version of Victory's UlTrans, called KillerTrans (キラートランス, Kirātoransu) and had use all these abilities: EX Red King Knuckle, Eleking Tail, King Joe Launcher, Gudon Whip, and Sadola Scissors.

The KillerTrans announcements were voiced by Tesshō Genda, who also voiced Yapool.

==== Yapool's Terrible-Monsters ====
- Moth Terrible-Monster Doragory (蛾超獣 ドラゴリー, Ga Chōjū Doragorī; 5 (Ginga), 10 (Ginga S), Fight Victory): One of the Spark Dolls in Lugiel's possession, Doragory was supposedly used by Kenta after being manipulated by Alien Valkie until Hikaru manages to bring him back to his senses. Doragory was used by Hikaru to fight Jean-Killer/Tomoya before switching to Ultraman Ginga. It was freed from Dark Lugiel's curse, however, in Ginga S, Exceller had Doragory in his collection of Spark Dolls. Whether it was the same one from Ginga or a copy is unknown. Doragory was utilized by Vorst until he was defeated by Victory. Yapool recreated this Terrible-Monster in Ultra Fight Victory as one of Juda's guardians in his revival until he was defeated by Astra.
- One-Horned Terrible-Monster Vakishim (一角超獣 バキシム, Ikkaku Chōjū Bakishimu; 5 (Ginga S), Fight Victory): Originally a Spark Doll kept by Exceller, it was first used by One Zero to fight Ultraman Ginga until Yapool, who surprisingly inhabited the Spark Doll casts her out and kept Vakishim in his dimension. Vakishim was called again when Victory tries to search Yapool and was defeated by said Ultra. In Ultra Fight Victory, Yapool recreated this Terrible-Monster as one of Juda's guardians in his revival until he was defeated by the Ultraman Leo.
- Missile Terrible-Monster Verokron (ミサイル超獣 ベロクロン, Misairu Chōjū Berokuron; 10 (Ginga S), Fight Victory): Originally a Spark Doll kept by Exceller, it was first used by Vorst alongside Doragory until it was defeated by Victory. In Ultra Fight Victory, Yapool recreated this Terrible-Monster as one of Juda's guardians in his revival until he was defeated by Ultraman Ace.
- Giant-Ant Terrible-Monster Aribunta (大蟻超獣 アリブンタ, Ōari Chōjū Aribunta; Fight Victory): Used by Yapool to act as a pawn by attacking the Victorian civilization before Victory shows up, allowing the villain to analyse all of his UlTrans. Just as Aribunta overpowers Victory, he was saved by Ultraman Hikari, who gave him the Knight Timbre and becomes Ultraman Victory Knight to destroy the Terrible-Monster.
- Full Moon Terrible-Monster Lunaticks (満月超獣 ルナチクス, Mangetsu Chōjū Runachikusu; Fight Victory): Sent by Yapool to attack the imprisoned Ginga while Victory Knight fought Victory-Killer, he quickly summoned Shepherdon to stop Lunaticks before it finishes the rabbit monster off.

=== Etelgar ===
Super Dimensional Demon Etelgar (超時空魔神 エタルガー, Chō Jikū Majin Etarugā) is the main antagonist of Ultraman Ginga S The Movie. A gigantic golden space alien, he kidnapped Alena and brainwashed her into his servant. Together, the two travel with a space time castle and kidnapped Heisei Ultras through dimensions, with the recent one is Cosmos. Zero had sensed the threat and chased him to Ginga's world, where Etelgar almost had Ginga and Victory defeated. His power is to trap his targets fears into their fears via Etel Image (エタルイマージュ, Etaru Imāju) and use his Etel Dummy ability to create clones of his opponents' past enemies. After the Heisei Ultras are freed, Etelgar fought Gingavictory and was defeated in space. He would return in the Ultraman Hit Song History: New Generation Chapter and plots his revenge by capturing the New Generation Heisei Ultras.

Etelgar is voiced by Tatsuhisa Suzuki (鈴木 達央, Suzuki Tatsuhisa).

=== Alena ===
Alena (アレーナ, Arēna) is the secondary antagonist of Ultraman Ginga S The Movie. She was a resident of Planet Zanto until she was captured by Etelgar. The villain brainwashed her into his servant by fabricating that her planet was destroyed by Ultramen and that he is her savior. In Ginga's world, she was purified by the energies of Victorium but Etelgar regains control of her until the Heisei Ultras were freed and Cosmos/Musashi rescued her again. In the aftermath of the battle, she was brought away by Cosmos/Musashi.

Alena was played by Arisa Komiya (小宮 有紗, Komiya Arisa).

=== Etel Dummies ===
Etel Dummies (エタルダミー, Etaru Damī) are clones of past enemies that the Heisei Ultras faced created by Etelgar out of their own fears.

- Dark Lugiel: Created by the citizens' fears, Dark Lugiel Etel Dummy served as the first opponent for the newly introduced Ultraman Gingavictory, being easily overwhelmed by fusion Ultra Warrior and destroyed via Gingavictory Breaker.
- Five King: An Etel Dummy created by the combined fears of Ultraman Tiga, Dyna and Gaia, the three Ultra Warriors faced it on the urban area and put an end to it by using their alternate forms' powers: Tiga Power Type's Delacium Light Stream, Dyna Miracle Type's Revolium Wave and Gaia Supreme's Photon Stream.
- Black Demon Dark Mephisto (黒い悪魔 ダークメフィスト, Kuroi Akuma Dāku Mefisuto): An Etel Dummy created in the form of Ultraman Nexus's first nemesis, the Ultra Warrior faced him in the first floor of Etelgar's castle and destroyed him via Junis' Over-Ray Schtrom.
- High-Speed Alien Alien Sran (高速宇宙人 スラン星人, Kōsoku Uchūjin Suran Seijin): An Etel Dummy stationed in the second floor of Etelgar's castle, Max fought and destroyed him via Max Galaxy's Galaxy Sword.
- Dark Space Great Emperor Alien Empera (暗黒宇宙大皇帝 エンペラ星人, Ankoku Uchū Dai Kōtei Enpera Seijin): An Etel Dummy stationed in the third floor of Etelgar's castle, Mebius fought and destroyed him via Mebium Burning Brave's Burning Mebium Dynamite.
- Ultraman Belial (ウルトラマンベリアル, Urutoraman Beriaru): An Etel Dummy stationed on the fourth floor, created based on Ultraman Zero's recurring conflict with his nemesis, Belial. This Belial clone was defeated when Zero assumes all of his forms and ending it with Shining Ultraman Zero's Shining Emerium Slash.

=== Juda Spectre ===
Phantom Space Emperor Juda Spectre (幻影宇宙帝王 ジュダ・スペクター, Gen'ei Uchū Teiō Juda Supekutā) is the main antagonist of Ultra Fight Victory. His main weapon is a golden sword called the Bat Calibre (バットキャリバー, Batto Kyaribā). Long ago, called as the Space Emperor Juda (宇宙の帝王 ジュダ, Uchū no Teiō Juda) he was killed by Andro Melos and his team on Planet Guar. He becomes a huge space distortion which can be sensed in tens of thousand years, laying a huge impact on the galaxy. Yapool sees this as a chance to enact his revenge on the Ultramen and tries to revive him. As Yapool died during Juda's revival, the tyrant unleashes Super Grand King Spectre and fights Ultraman Victory Knight but as it seems that he will win the fight, the Victorium Core that Yapool stole to feed him begins to assist Victory Knight and rebel against Juda, allowing Victory Knight to kill him with knight Victorium Break.

Juda Spectre is voiced by Nobuaki Kanemitsu (金光 宣明, Kanemitsu Nobuaki).

==== Super Grand King Spectre ====
Super Monster Super Grand King Spectre (超怪獣 スーパーグランドキング・スペクター, Chō Kaijū Sūpā Gurando Kinggu Supekutā) is Juda Spectre's monster. Originally the Super Combined Monster Grand King (超合体怪獣 グランドキング, Chō Gattai Kaijū Gurando Kingu) that was killed by the Ultra Brothers in Ultraman Story, it was recreated by Juda into a more golden appearance and armed with Bat Calibre, a similar sword that its master wielded. It attacked the Leo Brothers, Ace, and Ginga but after weakened by the Victorium Core, the Ultramen proceeded to attack again, finally killing it.

== Other Spark Doll monsters and aliens ==
=== Ultraman Ginga ===
As a result of the Dark Spark War, every combatants were transformed into Spark Dolls. This list covers other monsters and aliens that transformed into Spark Dolls. Six of Hikaru's Spark Dolls (Black King, Thunder Darambia, Kemur, King Pandon, Ragon and Ultraman Taro) starred in the mini-corner Spark Dolls Theatre at the end of the episodes. Followed by Lugiel's destruction, they were released from the curse and flew back to space.

- Bodyguard Monster Black King (用心棒怪獣 ブラックキング, Yōjinbō Kaijū Burakku Kingu; 1, 7): The first monster Spark Doll to be sighted, it was picked by Hikaru while he went hiking on the mountains. After failing to UltLive Ultraman Taro, he accidentally used the Spark Doll and becomes said monster in process, and attempted to stop Thunder Darambia before he swap it with Ultraman Ginga. Hikaru soon used it again against Dark Galberos but loses in a boxing match. In the Spark Dolls Theatre, Black King is voiced by Tetsuo Kishi (岸 哲生, Kiski Tetsuo) and speaks in a Kansai accent. First appeared in episode 37 of Return of Ultraman.
- Super Synthetic Monster Thunder Darambia (超合成獣 サンダーダランビア, Chō Gōsei-jū Sandā Daranbia; 1, 2): One of the Spark Dolls in Lugiel's possession to appear, Thunder Darambia was awakened after Alien Valkie manipulate Yamada and Kimura into using its Spark Dolls. Thunder Darambia first fight Hikaru/Black King, before the youth switched to Ultraman Ginga and reverted the monster to a Spark Doll to be reclaimed by him. During the first fight against Kemur, Hikaru uses Thunder Darambia but incapable of catching up with the alien's speed until he chooses Ginga. In the Spark Dolls Theatre, Thunder Darambia is voiced by Kenta Matsumoto, who would voice the young Ultraman Taro in this series and Ultraman Max in Ultraman Ginga S: The Movie. Thunder Darambia is a variant of Neo Darambia from episodes 1 and 2 of Ultraman Dyna.
- Abduction Phantom Kemur (誘拐怪人 ケムール人, Yūkai Kaijin Kemūru-jin; 2, 3): One of the Spark Dolls in Lugiel's possession, Kemur awakened after Alien Valkie manipulate Yagami into using its Spark Dolls. It tries to chase Misuzu and stopped by Hikaru, turning giant and faced the youth in Thunder Darambia but defeated by Ultraman Ginga and reverted to a Spark Doll. It was used by Hikaru to put out the flames set by Yuka and faced her as King Pandon before switching to Ginga. In the Spark Dolls Theatre, Kemur is voiced by Kōichi Toshima. First appeared in episode 19 of Ultra Q.
- Twin-headed Monster King Pandon (双頭怪獣 キングパンドン, Sōtō Kaijū Kingu Pandon; 3, 4): One of the Spark Dolls in Lugiel's possession, King Pandon awakened after Alien Valkie manipulate Yuka into using its Spark Dolls. It tried to burn the Furuhoshi Elementary School but stopped by Hikaru/Kemur before the youth switched to Ultraman Ginga to revert it to Spark Doll. Hikaru uses the doll to stop Chigusa/Ragon before he swapped into Ginga. In the Spark Dolls Theatre, King Pandon is voiced by Akiko Tanaka (田中 晶子, Tanaka Akiko). First appeared in Superior Ultraman 8 Brothers.
- Primordial Amphibian Ragon (海底原人 ラゴン, Kaitei Genjin Ragon; 4): One of the Spark Dolls in Lugiel's possession, Ragon awakened after Alien Valkie manipulate Chigusa into using its Spark Dolls. It tried to attack Misuzu out of jealousy for being picked as an idol and turns large, facing Hikaru/King Pandon before the youth swapped into Ultraman Ginga and separate Ragon from Chigusa. In the Spark Dolls Theatre, Ragon is voiced by Akiko Tanaka. First appeared in episode 21 of Ultra Q.
- Despot Monster Tyrant (暴君怪獣 タイラント, Bōkun Kaijū Tairanto; Ginga Theatre Special): A monster created by the combination of Alien Icarus and six other Spark Dolls, Tyrant proceeds to attack Hikaru and his friends until he was stopped and defeated by Hikaru/Ultraman Tiga and Tomoya/Jean-Nine, reverting to Alien Icarus and the Spark Dolls. First appeared in episode 40 of Ultraman Taro. The other six Spark Dolls that were used to make up Tyrant other than Alien Icarus are:
  - Skull Monster Red King (どくろ怪獣 レッドキング, Dokuro Kaijū Reddo Kingu; 8): Founded by Misuzu at the mountains, Red King was among those that stolen by Icarus to become Tyrant until his defeat had the doll landed on Hikaru's hands. Misuzu uses Red King with the Ginga Light Spark to assist Ultraman Ginga in battling against Shingo/Zaragas. First appeared in episode 8 of Ultraman.
  - Tornado Monster Seagorath (竜巻怪獣 シーゴラス, Tatsumaki Kaijū Shīgorasu): One of the Spark Dolls in Lugiel's possession, it was lend to Alien Icarus and is a part of the Tyrant formation, until his defeat had the doll landed in Hikaru's hands.
  - Great Space Monster Bemstar (宇宙大怪獣 ベムスター, Uchū Dai Kaijū Bemusutā): One of the Spark Dolls in Lugiel's possession, it was lend to Alien Icarus and is a part of the Tyrant formation, until his defeat had the doll landed in Hikaru's hands.
  - Hitman Terrible-Monster Baraba (殺し屋超獣 バラバ, Koroshiya Chōjū Baraba): Founded by Hikaru and Misuzu at the mountains, Barabas was among those that stolen by Icarus to become Tyrant until his defeat had the doll landed on Hikaru's hands.
  - Giant-Crab Terrible-Monster King Crab (大蟹超獣 キングクラブ, Ōgani Chōjū Kingu Kurabu): Founded by Alien Icarus at the mountains, King Crab was among those that stolen by Icarus to become Tyrant until his defeat had the doll landed on Hikaru's hands.
  - Sap Terrible-Monster Hanzagiran (液汁超獣 ハンザギラン, Ekijū Chōjū Hanzagiran): Founded by Hikaru and Chigusa at the mountains, Hanzagiran was among those that stolen by Icarus to become Tyrant until his defeat had the doll landed on Hikaru's hands.
- Fiendish Type Beast Dark Galberos (フィンディッシュタイプビースト ダークガルベロス, Findisshu Taipu Bīsuto Dakku Garuberosu; 7): One of the Spark Dolls in Lugiel's possession, Dark Galberos was awakened when Alien Nackle Gray manipulated Gō into using the Spark Doll. Dark Galberos battles Hikaru in a boxing match and wins the first round after failing to use Black King but loses when the youth swaps to Ginga. Dark Galberos is a variant of Galberos from episodes 6, 17, 18, and 35 of Ultraman Nexus.
- Transforming Monster Zaragas (変身怪獣 ザラガス, Henshin Kaijū Zaragasu; 8): One of the Spark Dolls in Lugiel's possession, Zaragas was awakened when Alien Nackle Gray manipulated Shingo into using the Spark Doll. It battles Red King and reverted by Ultraman Ginga. First appeared in episode 36 of Ultraman.
- Magnetic Monster Antlar (磁力怪獣 アントラー, Jiryoku Kaijū Antorā; 9): One of the Spark Dolls in Lugiel's possession, Antlar was awakened when Alien Nackle Gray manipulated Tomomi into using the Spark Doll. She easily defeated Hikaru's friends in Jashrin but before she was about to battle Ginga, Ultraseven Dark/Seiichirō betrayed her by reverting her to Spark Doll, claiming her too weak. First appeared in episode 7 of Ultraman.
- Space Three-faced Demon Statue Jashrin (宇宙三面魔像 ジャシュライン, Uchū Sanmen Ma-zō Jashurain; 9): A Spark Doll in Hotsuma's possession, he gave it to Misuzu, Kenta and Chigusa for them to fight Tomomi/Antlar when Hikaru was decommissioned from being hit by Ultraseven Dark. First appeared in episode 37 of Ultraman Mebius.
- Super Monster Super Grand King (超怪獣 スーパーグランドキング, Chō Kaijū Sūpā Gurando Kinggu; 10): One of the Spark Dolls in Lugiel's possession, Super Grand King was awakened when Alien Nackle Gray manipulated Misuzu into using the Spark Doll along with him. The two as Super Grand King manages to defeat Ultraman/Chigusa, Ultraseven/Seiichirō, Ultraman Tiga/Kenta and Jean-Nine/Tomoya until Hikaru manages to pursue Misuzu back to him and the two as Ginga obliterate Super Grand King, at the same time defeating Gray as well. It is an enhanced variant of Grand King from Ultraman Story.
- Space Dinosaur Zetton (宇宙恐竜 ゼットン, Uchū Kyōryū Zetton; EX): A Spark Doll in Alien Magma's possession, he used it after failing to get Chigusa under his control. He tried to use Zetton to destroy Japan but was stopped by Ultraman (Chigusa), Ultraman Tiga (Kenta) and Ultraman Ginga. Zetton and Magma soon asks for apprenticeship on Ginga as he agrees and brought them to space. First appeared in episode 39 of Ultraman.

=== Ultraman Ginga S ===
All Spark Dolls in this series were copies kept by Exceller in his ship, given that original ones were already reverted and returned to their homeworlds in the last season.

- Skull Monster EX Red King (どくろ怪獣 EXレッドキング, Dokuro Kaijū Ī Ekkusu Reddo Kingu; 1, 8): First used by One Zero to guard a stolen Victorium, she fought Shepherdon and Ultraman Victory until Ginga appeared and destroyed it. However, the Spark Doll was claimed by Victory, who utilized it as one of his UlTrans, EX Red King Knuckle. Hikaru borrowed it from Sho to fight Five King while UPG members were reviving Ultramen Ginga and Victory. First appeared in episode 13 of Ultra Galaxy Mega Monster Battle: Never Ending Odyssey.
- Space Monster Eleking (宇宙怪獣 エレキング, Uchū Kaijū Erekingu; 2, 8): First used by One Zero to steal electricities in the suburban area in the night and guard a stolen Victorium during the next day, it was defeated by Ultraman Victory, who was assisted by Ginga. The doll were claimed by Sho, who used it as part of Victory's UlTrans, Eleking Tail. Hikaru borrowed it from Sho to fight Five King while UPG members were reviving Ultramen Ginga and Victory. First appeared in episode 3 of Ultra Seven.
- Space Robot King Joe Custom (宇宙ロボット キングジョーカスタム, Uchū Robotto Kingu Jō Kasutamu; 3, 8): First used by Vorst to support the Inpelaizer (Chiburoid) army. It managed to overpower Victory but defeated by Ultraman Ginga, who used his newfound power, Ultraman Ginga Strium. The Spark Doll was claimed by Hikaru before he gave it to Shou, who would use it as part of Victory's UlTrans, King Joe Launcher. Hikaru borrowed it sometime later to fight Five King while UPG members were reviving Ultramen Ginga and Victory.
- Rock Monster Sadola (岩石怪獣 サドラ, Ganseki Kaijū Sadora; 4, 8): First used by One Zero to challenge the Ultramen, it fought Victory and got the upper hand after his UlTrans went wrong. It was defeated and claimed by Ultraman Ginga Strium, later used by Hikaru to rescue Lepi from Gudon (One Zero) until he gives it to Shou for Victory to utilize Sadola Scissors. First appeared in episode 3 of Return of Ultraman.
- Subterranean Monster Gudon (地底怪獣 グドン, Chitei Kaijū Gudon; 4): First used by One Zero to guard a stolen Victorium, it was defeated by Ultraman Victory and claimed the Spark Doll for his UlTrans, Gudon Whip. First appeared in episode 5 of Return of Ultraman.
- Ancient Monster Gomora (古代怪獣 ゴモラ, Kodai Kaijū Gomora; 6): First used by Hiyori to enact her revenge on the Victorians, it first fight Ginga Strium before she defected and attack Fire Golza (One Zero) instead. It was returned to a Spark Doll and its current location is unknown. First appeared in episode 26 of Ultraman.
- Super Combined Monster Five King (超合体怪獣 ファイブキング, Chō Gattai Kaijū Faibu Kingu; 7, 8): A gigantic combination monster created and MonsLived by Exceller by combining five Spark Dolls. It ambushed the exhausted Ginga Strium and Victory and killed both Ultras at ease. Soon, Exceller deployed it again on a rampaging spree, easily resisting all three monsters Hikaru UltLived (EX Red King, Eleking and King Joe Custom) but defeated by the revived Ultras. Five King's main ability revolves around its five monster's components and its attacks are Gol-Melba Cannon (ゴルメルバキャノン, Goru Meruba Kyanon) and Gan-Q Beam (ガンQビーム, Gan Kyū Bīmu). Among the components of Five King are:
  - Super Ancient Monster Fire Golza (超古代怪獣 ファイヤーゴルザ, Chō Kodai Kaijū Faiyā Goruza; 6, 7): First used by One Zero to assist Gomora (Hiyori) against Ginga Strium but betrayed by Gomora and defeated by Victory. After she retrieved the Spark Doll, Vorst used it alongside Gan-Q to absorb Shepherdon's energy for Exceller to create Five King until Fire Golza were defeated by Ginga Strium. First appeared as Golza in episode 1 and as Fire Golza (Powered Golza at that time) in episode 18 of Ultraman Tiga.
  - Super Ancient Dragon Melba (超古代竜 メルバ, Chō Kodai Ryū Meruba)
  - Space Sea Monster Reicubas (宇宙海獣 レイキュバス, Uchū Kaijū Reikyubasu)
  - Strange Creature Gan-Q (奇獣 ガンQ, Ki-jū Gan Kyū; 6, 11): First used by Vorst alongside Fire Golza to rob Shepherdon's Victorium energies before being defeated by the Magnewave Cannon used by Captain Yoshiaki Jinno. Later, a salaryman named Yoshida was forced to use it by Alien Akumania Muerte, trapping him in this monster human-sized, until Muerte controls him again in human size. But Gan-Q (Yoshida) breaks free from his control and hold Muerte off for Ultramen Ginga and Victory to finish. The doll is last seen in the hands of a boy that Yoshida taught to ride a bicycle and keeps it as his keepsake. First appeared in episode 6 of Ultraman Gaia.
  - Space Combat Beast Super C.O.V. (宇宙戦闘獣 スーパーコッヴ, Uchū Sentō-jū Sūpā Kovvu)
- Giant Space Monster Bemstar (9): First used by Vorst alongside Bemular to guard a stolen Victorium and attack UPG members. Bemstar was finally defeated when Victory sent it flying with EX Red King Knuckle. First appeared in episode 18 of Return of Ultraman.
- Space Monster Bemular (宇宙怪獣 ベムラー, Uchū Kaijū Bemurā; 9): First used by Vorst alongside Bemstar to guard a stolen Victorium. Bemular was finally defeated by Ultraman Ginga Strium. First appeared in episode 1 of Ultraman.
- Giant-fish Monster Zoa Muruchi (巨大魚怪獣 ゾアムルチ, Kyodai-gyo Kaijū Zoa Muruchi; 12): First used by Vorst to attack Chigusa and Alien Metron Jace. Eventually, Zoa Muruchi was defeated by the Ultramen after Jace distracted it. First appeared in episode 33 of Return of Ultraman.
- Volcanic Bird Monster Birdon (火山怪鳥 バードン, Kazan Kaichō Bādon; 13): First used by Vorst to wreak havoc in the countryside before being defeated by Victory. First appeared in episode 17 of Ultraman Taro.
- Space Dinosaur Hyper Zetton (Imago) (宇宙恐竜 ハイパーゼットン (イマーゴ), Uchū Kyōryū Haipā Zetton (Imāgo); 14): First used by Berume, his mission is to act as a diversion for UPG and Ultramen while Exceller invades the UPG Live Base. Hyper Zetton was defeated by Ultraman Ginga Strium and his Spark Doll were utilized by Ultraman Victory's UlTrans for Hyper Zetton Scissors. First appeared in Ultraman Saga.
