= Ultraman Ginga Theater Special =

Japanese name
- Kanji: ウルトラマンギンガ 劇場スペシャル
Transcriptions
- Revised Hepburn: Urutoraman Ginga Gekijō Supesharu
- Directed by: Yuichi Abe
- Written by: Akira Tanizaki
- Based on: Ultraman Ginga by Tsuburaya Productions
- Produced by: "Ultraman Ginga" Production Committee
- Starring: Takuya Negishi; Mio Miyatake; Mizuki Ohno; Kirara; Takuya Kusakawa
- Cinematography: Yoshihito Takahashi
- Edited by: Yosuke Yafune
- Music by: Takao Konishi
- Production company: Tsuburaya Productions
- Distributed by: Shochiku
- Release date: September 7, 2013 (Japan)
- Running time: 45 minutes
- Country: Japan
- Language: Japanese

Ultraman Ginga Theater Special (ウルトラマンギンガ 劇場スペシャル, Urutoraman Ginga Gekijō Supesharu) is a Japanese kaiju, and superhero, film, serving as the film adaptation of the 2013 Ultra Series television series Ultraman Ginga. It was released on September 7, 2013, which takes place during the season break of Ultraman Ginga, in-between episodes six and seven. This movie is double-billed with short CGI movie, Mega Monster Rush: Ultra Frontier - Dino-Tank Hunting (大怪獣ラッシュ ウルトラフロンティア DINO-TANK hunting, Dai Kaijū Rasshu Urutora Furontia Daino Tanku Hantingu), one of the shorts for the 2013 cardass game Mega Monster Rush: Ultra Frontier, which played first before the premier of the movie. A DVD and Blu-Ray release of the movie was sold on December 25, 2013 by Bandai Visual, costing around 3,990 and 5,040 Yen respectively.

The main catchphrase in this movie is "Monster Competition! Let's Go, Ginga!" (怪獣争奪戦!行くぜギンガ!, Kaijū sōdatsu-sen! Ikuze Ginga!).

== Synopsis ==
=== Mega Monster Rush: Ultra Frontier - Dino-Tank Hunting ===
At a desert arena, various participants tried to take down the Dino-Tank Mk II. With most participants eliminated, only one team left: the Rush Hunters, consisting of Baltan Battler Barrel, Guts Gunner Garm and Magma Master Magna. After a failed attempt to attack while Dino-Tank trapped inside an electrical field, Barrel turned himself into a barrier long enough to contain the Plasma Monster for Garm and Magna to attack, but the technique greatly exhausted Barrel. In a last effort, Barrel quickly destroyed the last Plasma Soul, causing Dino-Tank to fall into a pit for the Rush Hunters to win. Their Hunter Leader, Djent, express his satisfaction before reminding himself that his team still had a long way to go.

=== Ultraman Ginga Theater Special ===
The film started with a brief introduction given by Alien Valkie to the viewers, where he review past incidents from first to sixth episodes of Ultraman Ginga. After finish reviewing, he told the viewers that the mastermind still had his supply of monsters before fading.

The mysterious figure surveyed through his Spark Dolls collection and brought one to life, an Alien Icarus. While Hikaru contacted his parents in Glasgow, Scotland, both him and Taro received visions of monsters, which came from Mt. Furuboshi. The next day, Hiakru and his childhood friends went on a hike to Mt. Furuboshi to collect six Spark Dolls that had been scattered. The group split into two, Hikaru and Chigusa, followed by Misuzu, Taro and Kenta. With Hikaru and Chigusa found one first, Kenta, Misuzu and Taro stumbled upon Alien Icarus, whom also had the same goal in mind. Tomoya joined the three as they confiscated the Spark Doll from Icarus and the latter expelled by Taro's power. Tomoya's arrival was only due to crossing paths with them in his investigating mission, but Taro insisted him to protect them.

With two Spark Dolls in his possession, Icarus tried to impersonate Misuzu to trick Hikaru and Chigusa into giving them their Spark Dolls but the Ginga Spark emitted a backlash wave that shed half of his disguise, causing the two to escape and met the other group via Tomoya's signal. Alien Icarus chased after them and hold Misuzu as a hostage, later taking the Spark Dolls in exchange of her. With the Spark Dolls in his possession, Icarus fused with them into the monster Tyrant. Hikaru as well decided to use a special Spark Doll, Ultraman Tiga and engaged in a fight against the monster. Having drained up most of his energy, Tiga almost defeated until Tomoya brought Jean-Nine into the battle as the two defeated Tyrant, separating Alien Icarus from the six Spark Dolls. The captured Icarus tried to tell his secret out of the safety of his life but before he could do so, the mysterious figure turned him into a Spark Doll and bring forth Dark Zagi. The dark Ultraman quickly weakened Tomoya/Jean-Nine in its frenzied combat skilled and nearly torn the robot until Ginga appeared and took over Jean-Nine in the battle. Having fight in various continents around the world, both Ultra Warriors returned to the Mt. Furuboshi before they clashed their finishers, concluding the battle with Dark Zagi's defeat.

His Spark Doll was quickly recovered before Hikaru could find it. The group nonetheless return to their homes. Misuzu wondered if Hikaru's mission had concluded but both him and Taro denied as such.

After the ending credits, the Spark Doll Theater casts felt asleep until the realized that their screen time is currently running, causing all of them to go frantic. Taro, whom was watching the incident from behind reminded the viewers that Ultraman Ginga would return to broadcast in November.

== Cast ==
=== Mega Monster Rush: Ultra Frontier - Dino-Tank Hunting ===
- Baltan Batler Barrel (バルタンバトラー・バレル, Barutan Batorā Bareru; Voice): Daisuke Hirakawa (平川 大輔, Hirakawa Daisuke)
- Guts Gunner Garm (ガッツガンナー・ガルム, Gattsu Gannā Garumu; Voice): Binbin Takaoka (高岡 瓶々, Takaoka Binbin)
- Magma Master Magna (マグママスター・マグナ, Maguma Masutā Maguna; Voice): Toshinari Fukamachi (深町 寿成, Fukamachi Toshinari)
- Alien Mefilas Djent (メフィラス星人 ジェント, Mefirasu Seijin Jento; Voice): Kento Fujinuma (藤沼 建人, Fujinuma Kento)
- Kanegon a Kindo (カネゴン・ア・キンド; Voice): Chihiro Uno (うの ちひろ, Uno Chihiro)

=== Ultraman Ginga Theater Special ===
- Hikaru Raido (礼堂 ヒカル, Raidō Hikaru): Takuya Negishi (根岸 拓哉, Negishi Takuya)
- Misuzu Isurugi (石動 美鈴, Isurugi Misuzu): Mio Miyatake (宮武 美桜, Miyatake Mio)
- Kenta Watarai (渡会 健太, Watarai Kenta): Mizuki Ohno (大野 瑞生, Ōno Mizuki)
- Chigusa Kuno (久野 千草, Kuno Chigusa): Kirara (雲母)
- Tomoya Ichijōji (一条寺 友也, Ichijōji Tomoya): Takuya Kusakawa (草川 拓弥, Kusakawa Takuya)
- Taichi Kakisaki (柿崎 太一, Kakisaki Taichi): Shohei Uno (宇野 祥平, Uno Shōhei)
- Kyōko Shirai (白井 杏子, Shirai Kyōko): Hana Kino (木野 花, Kino Hana)
- Hotsuma Raido (礼堂 ホツマ, Raidō Hotsuma): Masahiko Tsugawa (津川 雅彦, Tsugawa Masahiko)
- Ultraman Taro (ウルトラマンタロウ, Urutoraman Tarō; Voice): Hiroya Ishimaru (石丸 博也, Ishimaru Hiroya)
- Alien Icarus (イカルス星人, Ikarusu Seijin; Voice): Tomokazu Seki (関 智一, Seki Tomokazu)
- Alien Valkie (バルキー星人, Barukī Seijin; Voice): Tatsuya Hashimoto (橋本 達也, Hashimoto Tatsuya)
- Unknown figure (Voice): Tomokazu Sugita (杉田 智和, Sugita Tomokazu)
- Ginga Spark Voice: Yoshihisa Kawahara (川原 慶久, Kawahara Yoshihisa)

==== Spark Dolls Theater ====
- Black King (ブラックキング, Burakku Kingu): Tetsuo Kishi (岸 哲生, Kishi Tetsuo)
- Thunder Darambia (サンダーダランビア, Sandā Daranbia): Kenta Matsumoto (松本 健太, Matsumoto Kenta)
- Kemur (ケムール人, Kemūru-jin): Kōichi Toshima (外島 孝一, Toshima Kōichi)
- King Pandon (キングパンドン, Kingu Pandon), Ragon (ラゴン): Akiko Tanaka (田中 晶子, Tanaka Akiko)

== Songs ==
Opening theme

- "Legend of Galaxy ~Ginga no Hasha~" (Legend of Galaxy ～銀河の覇者～; "Legend of Galaxy ~Champion of the Galaxy~")
  - Lyrics & Composition: Toshihiko Takamizawa (高見沢 俊彦, Takamizawa Toshihiko)
  - Arrangement: Toshihiko Takamizawa with Yuichiro Honda (本田 優一郎, Honda Yūichirō)
  - Artist: Takamiy with Mamoru Miyano (宮野 真守, Miyano Mamoru)
  - Verse 2, which would be played in Ultraman Ginga episodes 7 to 11.

Ending theme

- "Starlight"
  - Lyrics & Composition & Arrangement: Mayuko Maruyama (丸山 真由子, Maruyama Mayuko)
  - Artist: Ultra Bullet Train (ウルトラ超特急, Urutora Chōtokkyū)
  - Verse 1, the last to be played in the series before episodes 7 to 11.

Insert theme

- "Ultraman Ginga no Uta" (ウルトラマンギンガの歌, Urutoraman Giga no Uta; "The Song of Ultraman Ginga")
  - Lyrics: Hideki Tama (田靡 秀樹, Tama Hideki), Sei Okazaki (岡崎 聖, Okazaki Sei)
  - Composition & Arrangement: Takao Konishi (小西 貴雄, Konishi Takao)
  - Artist: Voyager with Chisa (千紗) (Girl Next Door), Maria Haruna (マリア春菜), Hiroaki Takeuchi (竹内 浩明, Takeuchi Hiroaki), Hikaru (Takuya Negishi), Misuzu (Mio Miyatake), Kenta (Mizuki Ohno), Chigusa (Kirara), Tomoya (Takuya Kusakawa)
