= Ultraman Ginga Theater Special: Ultra Monster Hero Battle Royal! =

Japanese name
- Kanji: ウルトラマンギンガ 劇場スペシャル ウルトラ怪獣☆ヒーロー大乱戦!
Transcriptions
- Romanization: Urutoraman Ginga Gekijō Supesharu Urutora Kaijū Hīrō Dairansen!
- Directed by: Tomoo Haraguchi
- Written by: Masanao Akahoshi
- Based on: Ultraman Ginga by Tsuburaya Productions
- Produced by: "Ultraman Ginga" Production Committee
- Starring: Takuya Negishi; Mio Miyatake; Mizuki Ohno; Kirara; Takuya Kusakawa
- Cinematography: Yoshihito Takahashi
- Edited by: Yosuke Yafune
- Music by: Takao Konishi
- Production company: Tsuburaya Productions
- Distributed by: Shochiku
- Release date: March 15, 2014 (Japan)
- Running time: 45 minutes
- Country: Japan
- Language: Japanese

Ultraman Ginga Theater Special: Ultra Monster Hero Battle Royal! (ウルトラマンギンガ 劇場スペシャル ウルトラ怪獣☆ヒーロー大乱戦!, Urutoraman Ginga Gekijō Supesharu Urutora Kaijū Hīrō Dairansen!) is a Japanese tokusatsu, and superhero film, serving as the film adaptation of the 2013 Ultra Series television series Ultraman Ginga. It was released on March 15, 2014, which takes place sometime after the season finale of Ultraman Ginga. This movie is double-billed with short CGI movie, Mega Monster Rush: Ultra Frontier - Verokron Hunting (大怪獣ラッシュ ウルトラフロンティア VEROKRON hunting, Dai Kaijū Rasshu Urutora Furontia Berokuron Hantingu), one of the shorts for the 2013 cardass game Mega Monster Rush: Ultra Frontier, which played first before the premier of the movie. A DVD and Blu-Ray release of the movie was sold on July 25, 2014 by Bandai Visual, costing around 3,800 and 4,800 Yen respectively.

The main catchphrase in this movie is Gathering! The New 5 Ultra Brothers!? UltLive Top Decisive Battle Begins!!! (集結!新ウルトラ5兄弟!? ウルトライブ頂上決戦開幕!!!, Shūketsu! Shin Urutora Go-kyōdai!? Urutoraibu Chōjō Kessen Kaimaku!!!).

== Synopsis ==
=== Mega Monster Rush: Ultra Frontier - Verokron Hunting ===
The Rush Hunters fight against Verokron in a remote planet, but while the team tried to retreat from Verokron's assaults Magma suddenly grabbed one of the missiles heading for him and throw it against Verokron. Discovering that he possessed a hidden ability, Barel and Garm diverted Verokron's attention long enough for Magma to summon the mysterious power again and uses one of Verokron's missiles against the Terrible-Monster, destroying it once the warhead enters its own body. Although the viewers of the Hunter Station celebrated their victory, but the planet that Verokron previously spotted was destroyed and released the Plasma-Killersaurus, which awakens dormant Plasma crystal monsters. Due to this, various participants, including the Rush Hunters prepared for another course of the game.

=== Spark Dolls Theater ===
The cast of the Spark Dolls Theater (Black King, Thunder Darambia, Kemur-Man, King Pandon and Ragon) thank the viewers for supporting Ultraman Ginga for the past years. The group then asks the viewers to sing along the Ultraman Ginga no Uta before Red king, Doragory and Mochiron joins in.

=== Ultraman Ginga Theater Special: Ultra Monster ☆ Hero Battle Royal! ===
The movie starts with clips of past Ultraman Ginga episodes alongside events from the past movie while the Ultraman Ginga no Uta song being played.

Cut to the present day, Tomoya leisurely sketches the Ultra Monsters in his sketchbook but an unknown forces suddenly radiated the book. Misuzu, Kenta and Chigusa were called to an office and discovered several Spark Dolls, which were thought to be sent to the outer space but somehow returned to Earth. Hikaru soon arrives, having rode an airplane from London and together, the party were transported into a virtual room by Tomoya's Gunpad. The room itself has several Spark Dolls in collection. He introduced them the Livepad (ライブパッド, Raibupaddo), a tablet which allows its user to use UltLive simulations simply by scanning the Spark Doll via the tip of its pointer pen.

The group soon played using multiple monster Spark Dolls until Hikaru used Ultraman Ginga and the rest of them decided to follow him as well, much to Hikaru's dismay as no Ultraman ever fought each other. Tomoya becomes Ultraman, Kenta as Ultraseven, Chigusa as Ultraman Tiga and Misuzu as Ultraman Taro. While Hikaru still trying to cope with the events, five dark Ultra Warriors appeared out of nowhere: Chaos Ultraman, Chaosroid T, Evil Tiga, Chaosroid S and Chaosroid U. With even Tomoya not knowing what actually happened, the team had no choice but to fight their counterparts. The battle turns deadlier, as the safety of Hikaru and his friend's consciousness at stake due to being in the Livepad. If they loses, their consciousness would not return to the real world and since the evil Ultra Warriors are not simulations, their strength are comparably superior to the party's Lived Ultras. During that time, the real Ultraman Ginga contacts Hikaru via telepathy, reminding the youth of his promise to travel around the Earth and reunite once his adventures were over. This gives Hikaru and his friends the strength to fight back the dark Ultra Warriors with their finishers. Their victory however is short lived, as the virtual program is lost when Tomoya's worker accidentally tripped over some wires, although the party managed to return to the real life. The fake Spark Dolls were lost as well but was revealed to have been returned to Tomoya's sketchbook, which he tried to hide from his friends.

Meanwhile, news was broadcast which reported on a cosmic energy radiation that bathed the Earth at the same time. Hotsuma Raidō recite a prayer, which was meant to thank the viewers as Hikaru and his friends (with the whole party except Hotsuma shrunken to be placed on Ginga's palm) cheered the viewers as well for their support. In the epilogue, Gavadon Alpha and Beta's Spark Dolls appear with the text "The End" (おしまい, Oshimai) before the screen fading in black.

== Cast ==
=== Mega Monster Rush: Ultra Frontier - Verokron Hunting ===
- Baltan Batler Barrel (バルタンバトラー・バレル, Barutan Batorā Bareru; Voice): Daisuke Hirakawa (平川 大輔, Hirakawa Daisuke)
- Guts Gunner Garm (ガッツガンナー・ガルム, Gattsu Gannā Garumu; Voice): Binbin Takaoka (高岡 瓶々, Takaoka Binbin)
- Magma Master Magna (マグママスター・マグナ, Maguma Masutā Maguna; Voice): Toshinari Fukamachi (深町 寿成, Fukamachi Toshinari)
- Alien Mefilas Djent (メフィラス星人 ジェント, Mefirasu Seijin Jento; Voice): Kento Fujinuma (藤沼 建人, Fujinuma Kento)
- Kanegon a Kindo (カネゴン・ア・キンド; Voice): Chihiro Uno (うの ちひろ, Uno Chihiro)

=== Ultraman Ginga Theater Special ===
- Hikaru Raidō (礼堂 ヒカル, Raidō Hikaru): Takuya Negishi (根岸 拓哉, Negishi Takuya)
- Misuzu Isurugi (石動 美鈴, Isurugi Misuzu): Mio Miyatake (宮武 美桜, Miyatake Mio)
- Kenta Watarai (渡会 健太, Watarai Kenta): Mizuki Ohno (大野 瑞生, Ōno Mizuki)
- Chigusa Kuno (久野 千草, Kuno Chigusa): Kirara (雲母)
- Tomoya Ichijōji (一条寺 友也, Ichijōji Tomoya): Takuya Kusakawa (草川 拓弥, Kusakawa Takuya)
- Secretary: Megumi Nishimuta (西牟田 恵, Nishimuta Megumi)
- Toshiko Mimatsu (三松 としこ, Mimatsu Toshiko): Megumi Araki (荒木 めぐみ, Araki Megumi)
- Interviewed man: Toshio Miike (三池 敏夫, Miike Toshio)
- Hotsuma Raidō (礼堂 ホツマ, Raidō Hotsuma): Masahiko Tsugawa (津川 雅彦, Tsugawa Masahiko)
- Ultraman Taro (ウルトラマンタロウ, Urutoraman Tarō; Voice): Hiroya Ishimaru (石丸 博也, Ishimaru Hiroya)
- Ultraman Ginga (ウルトラマンギンガ, Urutoraman Ginga; Voice): Tomokazu Sugita (杉田 智和, Sugita Tomokazu)
- Ginga Spark/Livepad Voice: Yoshihisa Kawahara (川原 慶久, Kawahara Yoshihisa)

==== Spark Dolls Theater ====
- Black King (ブラックキング, Burakku Kingu): Tetsuo Kishi (岸 哲生, Kishi Tetsuo)
- Thunder Darambia (サンダーダランビア, Sandā Daranbia): Kenta Matsumoto (松本 健太, Matsumoto Kenta)
- Kemur Man (ケムール人, Kemūru Jin): Kōichi Toshima (外島 孝一, Toshima Kōichi)
- King Pandon (キングパンドン, Kingu Pandon), Ragon (ラゴン): Akiko Tanaka (田中 晶子, Tanaka Akiko)

== Songs ==
Opening/Insert theme

- "Ultraman Ginga no Uta" (ウルトラマンギンガの歌, Urutoraman Ginga no Uta; "The Song of Ultraman Ginga")
  - Lyrics: Hideki Tama (田靡 秀樹, Tama Hideki), Sei Okazaki (岡崎 聖, Okazaki Sei)
  - Composition & Arrangement: Takao Konishi (小西 貴雄, Konishi Takao)
  - Artist: Voyager with Chisa (千紗) (Girl Next Door), Maria Haruna (マリア春菜), Hiroaki Takeuchi (竹内 浩明, Takeuchi Hiroaki), Hikaru (Takuya Negishi), Misuzu (Mio Miyatake), Kenta (Mizuki Ohno), Chigusa (Kirara), Tomoya (Takuya Kusakawa)

Ending theme

- "Starlight"
  - Lyrics & Composition & Arrangement: Mayuko Maruyama (丸山 真由子, Maruyama Mayuko)
  - Artist: Ultra Bullet Train (ウルトラ超特急, Urutora Chōtokkyū)
  - Verse 2 and onwards
