= Takuya Kusakawa =

Japanese singer, actor, and dancer (born 1994)

Takuya Kasukawa
- 草川 拓弥
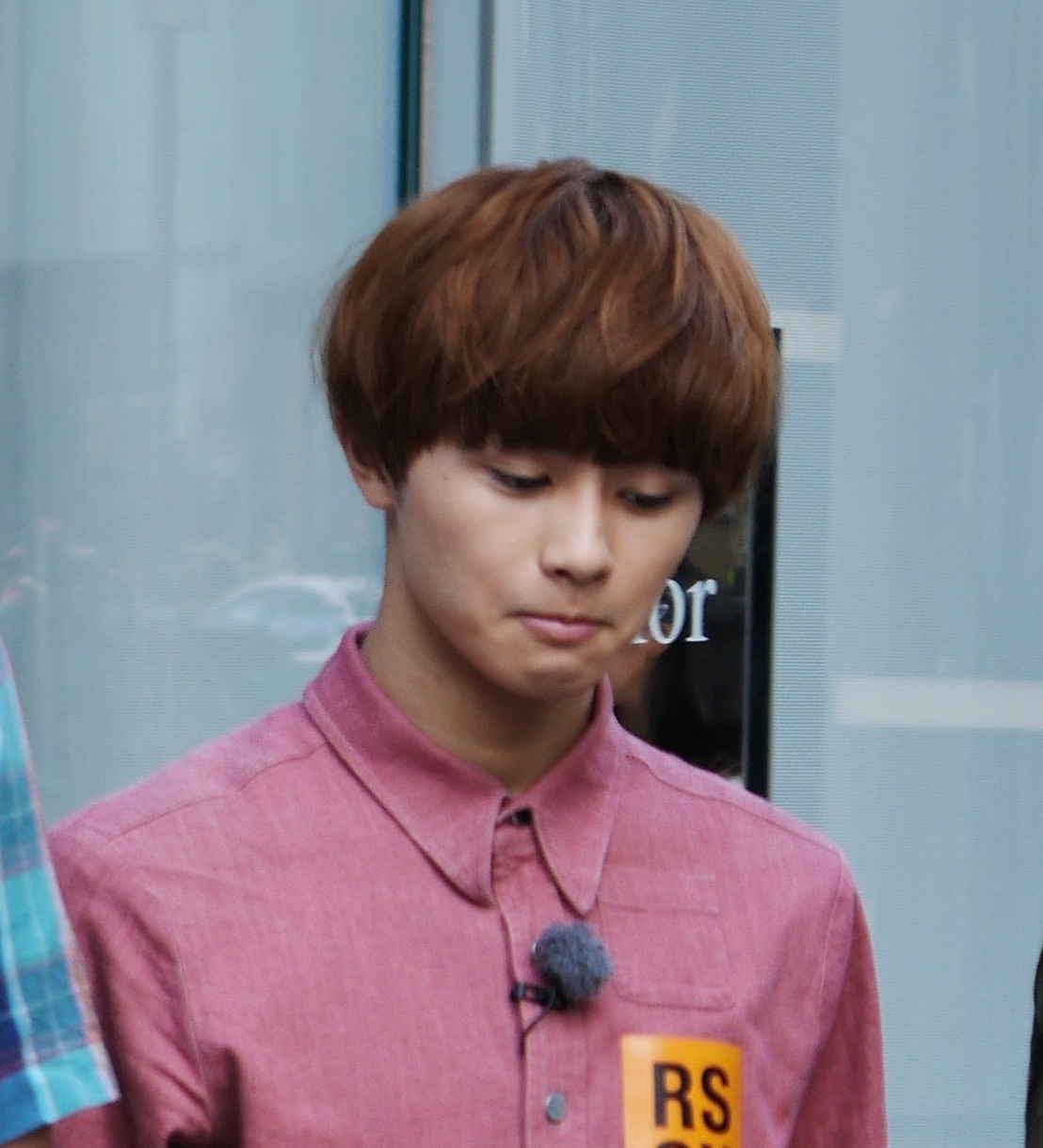
- Born: 24 November 1994 (age 31); Tokyo, Japan
- Occupations: Actor; singer; dancer
- Years active: 2008–present
- Relatives: Naoya Kusakawa (younger brother)
- Musical career
- Genres: J-pop; Electropop; EDM
- Instrument: Vocals
- Years active: 2012–present
- Label: Stardust Promotion
- Member of: Bullet Train
- Website: takuyakusakawa.com

Takuya Kusakawa (草川 拓弥, Kusakawa Takuya; born November 24, 1994), is a Japanese actor, singer, and dancer. He debuted as a member of the Japanese boy group Bullet Train, under Stardust Promotion in March 2012.

== Early life and career ==
Kusakawa was born on November 24, 1994 in Tokyo. His family consists of his mother, father, and a younger brother, singer Naoya Kusakawa, who also pursued a career in music and acting.

On March 7, 2012, Kusakawa joined the music group Bullet Train, replacing then-member Sho Takemura. Although he joined as the "main dancer", he had no prior dance experience at the time of his debut with the band.

== Filmography ==
=== Film ===
| Year | Title | Role | Notes | Ref. |
|---|---|---|---|---|
| 2010 | Confessions | Hiroki Takahashi | | |
| 2013 | Ultraman Ginga Theater Special | Yuya Ichijoji | | |
| 2014 | Ultraman Ginga Theater Special: Ultra Monster Hero Battle Royal! | Yuya Ichijoji | | |
| 2015 | Ultraman Ginga S The Movie: Decisive Battle! Ultra 10 Warriors!! | Yuya Ichijoji | | |
| 2015 | Sideline | Shinya Ise | Lead role | |
| 2017 | My Brother Loves Me Too Much | Chiaki Mioka | | |
| 2022 | Cherry Magic! Thirty Years of Virginity Can Make You a Wizard?! | Yuta Rokkaku | | |
| 2025 | Salary Man Kintaro 2 | Tokunaga | | |
| 2025 | One Last Throw | Endo | | |
| 2026 | Road to Vendetta | Fujiwara | Hong Kong-Japanese film | |
| 2026 | The Mountain | Onodera | | |
| 2026 | A Side Character's Love Story | Yuya Kaneko | | |
| 2026 | Why Wait, Just Die | Yuya Sakuma | | |
| 2027 | The Day We Embraced the Universe | | | |

=== Television drama ===
| Year | Title | Role | Notes | Ref. |
|---|---|---|---|---|
| 2008 | Poor Men | Kazumi's older brother | | |
| 2009 | Tenchijin | Matajiro | Taiga drama; episode 34 | |
| 2010 | Summer Love Shines in Rainbow Colors | Daiki Kusunoki (teen) | Episode 1 | |
| 2010–11 | Bride's Curtain | Kagura Shota | Season 1 & 2 | |
| 2011 | High School Restaurant | Tsuyoshi Miyashita | | |
| 2012 | Taira no Kiyomori | Taira no Munemori (child) | Taiga drama | |
| 2013 | Ultraman Ginga | Yuya Ichijoji | | |
| 2014 | Ultraman Ginga S | Yuya Ichijoji | | |
| 2014 | Soko o Nantoka | Rikuya | Season 2; episode 4 | |
| 2015 | My Heart Breaks | Cameo | Episode 10 | |
| 2017 | My Brother Loves Me Too Much | Chiaki Mioka | | |
| 2017 | Your Home Is My Business! Returns | Yoichi Kagimura | Single-episode drama | |
| 2017 | Metropolitan Police Department, Animal Affairs Division | Cameo | Episode 6 | |
| 2019 | Sakura, My Dear Colleague | Wakida Soshin | | |
| 2019 | Your Home Is My Business! 2nd Attack | Yoichi Kagimura | Sequel | |
| 2020 | Fake Motion: King of Table Tennis | Saigo Yoshinosuke | Season 1 | |
| 2020 | Gourmet Detective Goro Akechi | Rokuro Akechi | Episode 6 | |
| 2020 | Cherry Magic! Thirty Years of Virginity Can Make You a Wizard?! | Yuta Rokkaku | | |
| 2021 | Fake Motion: One and Only Wish | Saigo Yoshinosuke | Season 2 | |
| 2021 | The Rules of Romantic Comedy: A Complex Girl and a Younger Guy | Kujo Junta | | |
| 2021 | My Androgynous Boyfriend | Tate Sasame | Episodes 6, 7, 9, & 10 | |
| 2021 | Anyway, I Won't Run Away | Yo Takehiko | | |
| 2022 | Cross Tale: Detective Classroom | Atsuya Fujimaki | | |
| 2022–23 | Minato's Laundromat | Akira Minato | Lead role; 2 seasons | |
| 2023 | Hitofurano Hatsukoi | Toru Mizushima | Lead role; short film | |
| 2023 | Fat, Love and Mistakes! | Yuki Keisuke | Lead role | |
| 2023 | Angel's Ears: Traffic Police Night | Kazuo Tomono | | |
| 2023 | Last Man: The Blind Investigator | Akito Ueda | | |
| 2023 | Subscription Affair | Junya Kurosaki | | |
| 2024 | I Want to Say I Love You | Ryu Kamiki | | |
| 2024 | Shut Up | Yota Uno | | |
| 2024 | Izakaya Shinkansen | Takahashi | Season 2; episode 1 | |
| 2024 | Our Love Tactics | Souta Taneda | | |
| 2024 | Business Marriage: If I Fall in Love, I'll Divorce | Tsukasa Donose | Lead role | |
| 2024 | Baby Assassins Everyday! | Kei Natsume | | |
| 2024 | Divorce Lawyer Spider: Alimony Battle | Shingo | | |
| 2025 | The Best Old Lady Nakajima Haruko: Madame in a Little Bangkok | Hayato | | |
| 2025 | Dinner Blues | Aoi Makita | | |
| 2025 | Courtroom Dragon | | | |
| 2025 | Suspicious Partner | Ren Umehara | | |
| 2025 | Even Shrimp Want to Catch Sea Bream | Takumi Miura | | |
| 2025 | Hell is Made of Good Intentions | Takamura Itsuki | Lead role | |
| 2025 | Molestation!!! Tanaka-san | Kinichi Tanaka | Lead role; web series, short drama | |
| 2025 | Kokoro | I | Lead role | |
| 2026 | We Are Bad Barbers | Tsukishiro Tsukasa | Lead role | |
| 2026 | It's All for You | Makoto Sugiura | | |
| 2026 | Tokyo Metropolitan Police Department Public Relations Section 2 | Yoshito Izawa | | |
| 2026 | First Cry | | Episode 7 | |
| 2027 | The Shogunate Rebel | Arakawa Yuzo | Taiga drama | |

== Bibliography ==
=== Photobooks ===
- London: Better than a Wall or a Floor (July 7, 2017, Shufu to Seikatsusha) ISBN 978-4-391-15068-1
- Consistency (April 8, 2024, Gentosha ISBN 978-4-3440-4253-7
