= Ultraman Ginga =

Japanese television series produced by Tsuburaya Productions

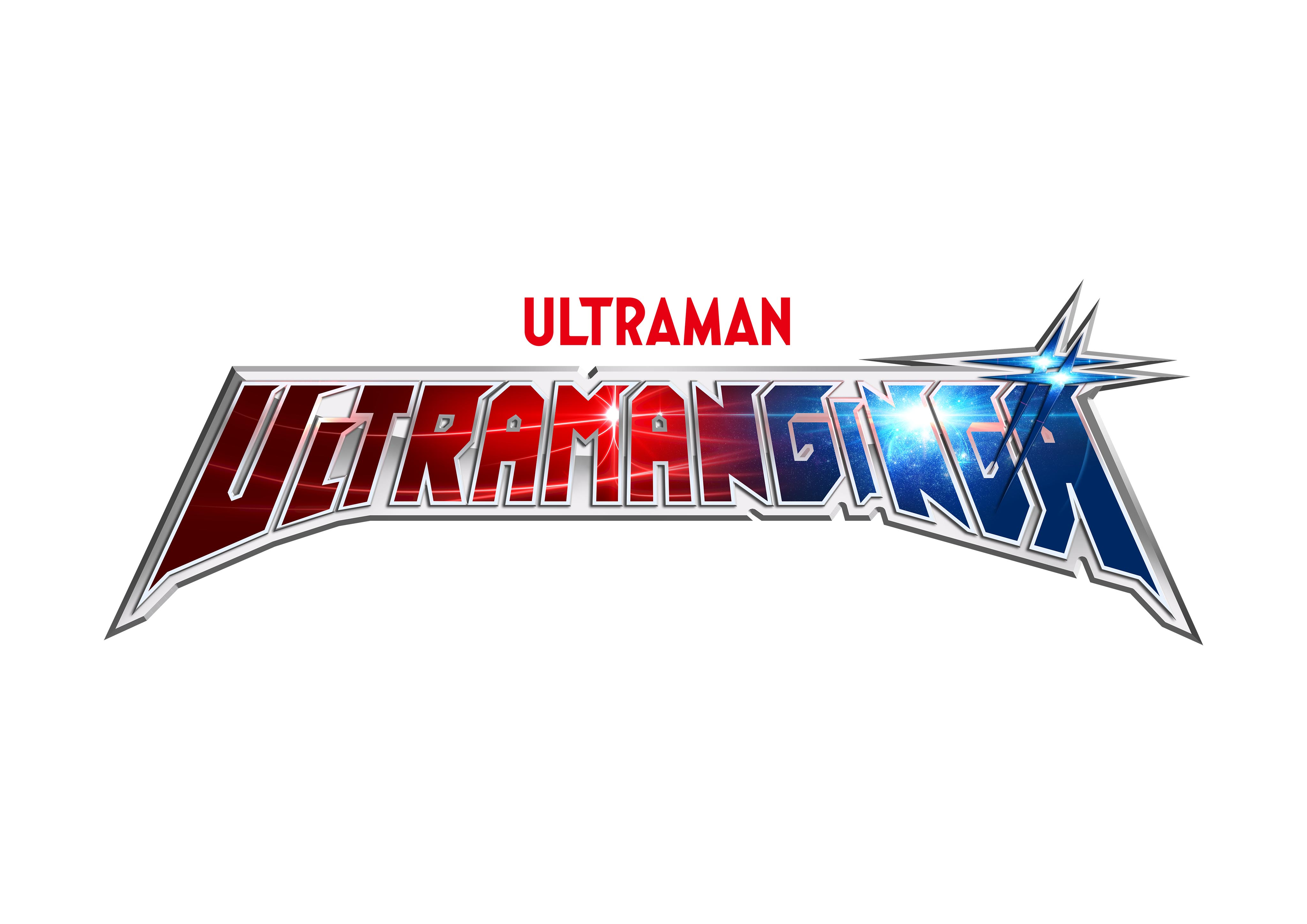
- Genre: Tokusatsu; Superhero; Sci-Fi; Action/Adventure; Kaiju; Kyodai Hero
- Written by: Keiichi Hasegawa; Akira Tanizaki; Kenichi Araki; Masanao Akahoshi; Junichiro Ashiki
- Directed by: Yuichi Abe; Tomoo Haraguchi; Kengo Kaji; Yoshikazu Ishii; Yusuke Murakami
- Starring: Takuya Negishi; Mio Miyatake; Mizuki Ohno; Kirara; Takuya Kusakawa
- Music by: Takao Konishi
- Opening theme: Legend of Galaxy ~Ginga no Hasha~ by Toshihiko Takamizawa and Mamoru Miyano
- Country of origin: Japan
- Original language: Japanese
- No. of episodes: 11 (+1 EX)

Production
- Producer: Daisuke Kanemitsu
- Running time: 30 mins
- Production company: Tsuburaya Productions

Original release
- Network: TXN (TV Tokyo)
- Release: July 10 – December 18, 2013

Related
- Neo Ultra Q; Ultraman Ginga S

Ultraman Ginga (ウルトラマンギンガ, Urutoraman Ginga), is a Japanese television series produced by Tsuburaya Productions. It is the 17th entry (26th overall) in the Ultra Series, released to celebrate the company's 50th anniversary. It is the first entry in the New Generation series, ending a six year long hiatus of live action shows produced in Japan after Ultraman Mebius concluded in 2007. It aired as part of the New Ultraman Retsuden programming block on TV Tokyo from July 10, 2013 to December 18, 2013. A second season titled Ultraman Ginga S aired in 2014.

== Story ==
All of the Ultraman and monsters have been turned into figures known as Spark Dolls (スパークドールズ, Supāku Dōruzu) and become scattered throughout the universe. A young man named Hikaru Raido finds an item called the Ginga Spark, which not only allows him to become Ultraman Ginga but also allows him to UltLive (ウルトライブ, Urutoraibu) with the figures to revert them to their rightful size and become one with them. Hikaru fights with his friends to uncover the darkness behind the Spark Dolls. Alien Nackie drops a clue that the wielder of darkness resides in their very elementary school.

In the final episode, the master of darkness, Dark Lugiel reveals himself. He destroys the elementary school before proceeding to defeat Ginga. When all hope seems lost, Ultraman Taro regains his true form and rises to fight Dark Lugiel. He manages to revive Ginga before being defeated himself, and Ginga and Lugiel have an intense battle on the moon, ending with Lugiel's defeat. Ginga and Taro say their goodbyes to Hikaru and friends as they leave Earth for their homeland.

== Episodes ==
No.	Title	Directed by	Written by	Original release date
1	"Town of Falling Stars"; Transliteration: "Hoshi no Furu Machi" (Japanese: 星の降る町)	Yuichi Abe	Keiichi Hasegawa	July 10, 2013
2	"A Midsummer Night’s Dream"; Transliteration: "Natsu no Yoru no Yume" (Japanese: 夏の夜の夢)	Yuichi Abe	Keiichi Hasegawa	July 17, 2013
3	"The Twin-Headed Flame Beast"; Transliteration: "Sōtō no Kaenjū" (Japanese: 双頭の火炎獣)	Tomoo Haraguchi	Akira Tanizaki	July 24, 2013
4	"The Idol is Ragon"; Transliteration: "Aidoru wa Ragon" (Japanese: アイドルはラゴン)	Tomoo Haraguchi	Kenichi Araki	July 31, 2013
5	"The Hater of Dreams"; Transliteration: "Yume o Nikumu Mono" (Japanese: 夢を憎むもの)	Kengo Kaji	Masanao Akahoshi	August 7, 2013
6	"The Battle for Dreams"; Transliteration: "Yume o Kaketa Tatakai" (Japanese: 夢を懸けた戦い)	Kengo Kaji	Masanao Akahoshi	August 14, 2013
7	"The Closed World"; Transliteration: "Tozasareta Sekai" (Japanese: 閉ざされた世界)	Tomoo Haraguchi	Keiichi Hasegawa	November 20, 2013
8	"The Stolen Ginga Spark"; Transliteration: "Ubawareta Ginga Supāku" (Japanese: 奪われたギンガスパーク)	Yoshikazu Ishii	Keiichi Hasegawa	November 27, 2013
9	"The Jet Black Ultra Brothers"; Transliteration: "Shikkoku no Urutora Kyōdai" (Japanese: 漆黒のウルトラ兄弟)	Yoshikazu Ishii	Kenichi Araki	December 4, 2013
10	"Darkness and Light"; Transliteration: "Yami to Hikari" (Japanese: 闇と光)	Yuichi Abe	Akira Tanizaki	December 11, 2013
11	"Your Future"; Transliteration: "Kimi no Mirai" (Japanese: きみの未来)	Yuichi Abe	Keiichi Hasegawa	December 18, 2013
EX (12)	"Friends Left Behind"; Transliteration: "Nokosareta Nakama" (Japanese: 残された仲間)	Yusuke Murakami	Junichiro Ashiki	February 26, 2014

== Films ==
- Ultraman Ginga Theater Special (ウルトラマンギンガ 劇場スペシャル, Urutoraman Ginga Gekijō Supesharu) is the first film adaptation of this series. It was released on September 7, 2013, as a double-bill with Mega Monster Rush: Ultra Frontier - Dino-Tank Hunting. Chronologically it takes place between Episode 6 & 7.
- Ultraman Ginga Theater Special: Ultra Monster Hero Battle Royal! (ウルトラマンギンガ 劇場スペシャル ウルトラ怪獣☆ヒーロー大乱戦!, Urutoraman Ginga Gekijō Supesharu Urutora Kaijū Hīrō Dairansen!) is the second film adaptation of this series. It was released on March 15, 2014, as a double-bill with Mega Monster Rush: Ultra Frontier - Verokron Hunting. Chronologically it takes place at some point in time after the final episode.

== Cast ==
- Hikaru Raido (礼堂 ヒカル, Raidō Hikaru): Takuya Negishi (根岸 拓哉, Negishi Takuya)
- Misuzu Isurugi (石動 美鈴, Isurugi Misuzu): Mio Miyatake (宮武 美桜, Miyatake Mio)
- Kenta Watarai (渡会 健太, Watarai Kenta): Mizuki Ohno (大野 瑞生, Ōno Mizuki)
- Chigusa Kuno (久野 千草, Kuno Chigusa): Kirara (雲母)
- Tomoya Ichijoji (一条寺 友也, Ichijōji Tomoya): Takuya Kusakawa (草川 拓弥, Kusakawa Takuya)
- Taichi Kakisaki (柿崎 太一, Kakisaki Taichi): Shohei Uno (宇野 祥平, Uno Shōhei)
- Gō Ōsato (大里 剛, Ōsato Gō): Mitsuki Koga (虎牙 光揮, Koga Mitsuki)
- Shingo Kuwabara (桑原 伸吾, Kuwabara Shingo): Shohei Abe (阿部 翔平, Abe Shōhei)
- Tomomi Kuroki (黒木 知美, Kuroki Tomomi): Maiko Kawakami (川上 麻衣子, Kawakami Maiko)
- Seiichirō Isurugi (石動 誠一郎, Isurugi Seiichirō): Hironobu Nomura (野村 宏伸, Nomura Hironobu)
- Kyōko Shirai (白井 杏子, Shirai Kyōko): Hana Kino (木野 花, Kino Hana)
- Hotsuma Raido (礼堂 ホツマ, Raidō Hotsuma): Masahiko Tsugawa (津川 雅彦, Tsugawa Masahiko)

=== Voice cast ===
- Ultraman Ginga, Dark Lugiel (ダークルギエル, Dāku Rugieru): Tomokazu Sugita (杉田 智和, Sugita Tomokazu)
- Ultraman Taro (ウルトラマンタロウ, Urutoraman Tarō): Hiroya Ishimaru (石丸 博也, Ishimaru Hiroya)
- Alien Valky (バルキー星人, Barukī Seijin): Tatsuya Hashimoto (橋本 達也, Hashimoto Tatsuya)
- Alien Nackle "Gray" (ナックル星人 グレイ, Nakkuru Seijin Gurei): Kunji Hirano (平野 勲人, Hirano Kunji)
- Ginga Spark (ギンガスパーク, Ginga Supāku), Dark Spark (ダークスパーク, Dāku Supāku): Yoshihisa Kawahara (川原 慶久, Kawahara Yoshihisa)

=== Guest cast ===
- Yamada (山田; 1–2, 11): Kazuhiko Kanayama (金山 一彦, Kanayama Kazuhiko)

== Songs ==
Opening theme

- "Legend of Galaxy ~Ginga no Hasha~" (Legend of Galaxy ～銀河の覇者～; "Legend of Galaxy ~Champion of the Galaxy~")
  - Lyrics & Composition: Toshihiko Takamizawa (高見沢 俊彦, Takamizawa Toshihiko)
  - Arrangement: Toshihiko Takamizawa with Yuichiro Honda (本田 優一郎, Honda Yūichirō)
  - Artist: Takamiy with Mamoru Miyano (宮野 真守, Miyano Mamoru)
  - Episodes: 1–6 (Verse 1), 7–11, Extra (Verse 2)

Ending theme

- "Starlight"
  - Lyrics & Composition & Arrangement: Mayuko Maruyama (丸山 真由子, Maruyama Mayuko)
  - Artist: Ultra Bullet Train (ウルトラ超特急, Urutora Chōtokkyū)
  - Episodes: 1–6, Extra (Verse 1), 7–11 (Verse 2)

Insert theme

- "Ultraman Ginga no Uta" (ウルトラマンギンガの歌, Urutoraman Giga no Uta; "The Song of Ultraman Ginga")
  - Lyrics: Hideki Tama (田靡 秀樹, Tama Hideki), Sei Okazaki (岡崎 聖, Okazaki Sei)
  - Composition & Arrangement: Takao Konishi (小西 貴雄, Konishi Takao)
  - Artist: Voyager with Chisa (千紗) (Girl Next Door), Maria Haruna (マリア春菜), Hiroaki Takeuchi (竹内 浩明, Takeuchi Hiroaki), Hikaru (Takuya Negishi), Misuzu (Mio Miyatake), Kenta (Mizuki Ohno), Chigusa (Kirara), Tomoya (Takuya Kusakawa)
  - Episodes: 1–3, 6–7, 10–11, Extra
- "Natsu no Kaze Aki no Kaze" (夏の風 秋の風; "Summer Wind, Autumn Wind")
  - Lyrics: Maria Haruna
  - Composition & Arrangement: Takao Konishi
  - Artist: Chisa (Girl Next Door), Maria Haruna, Chigusa (Kirara)
  - Episodes: 4, Extra
- Ultraman Taro (ウルトラマンタロウ, Urutoraman Tarō)
  - Lyrics: Yū Aku (阿久 悠, Aku Yū)
  - Composition and arrangement: Makoto Kawaguchi (川口 真, Kawaguchi Makoto)
  - Artist: Tarō Takemura (武村 太郎, Takemura Tarō), Mizuumi Boys & Girls Chorus (少年少女合唱団みずうみ, Shōnen Shōjo Gasshōdan Mizuumi)
  - Final episode

== See also ==
- Ultra Series - Complete list of official Ultraman-related shows
- Ultraman Ginga S - A sequel to the show
