= Bullet Train (band) =

Japanese boy band

Bullet Train 超特急
- Origin: Japan
- Genres: J-pop; Electropop; EDM
- Years active: 2011–present
- Labels: SDR; Polydor
- Members: Kai; Ryoga; Takuya; Yuki; Takashi; Shuya; Masahiro; Aloha; Haru
- Past members: Kōichi Yoshino; Shō Takemura; Yūsuke Fukuda
- Website: bullettrain.jp

Bullet Train (超特急, Chōtokkyū) is a Japanese boy band under EBiDAN formed on December 25, 2011, under Stardust Promotion. The group debuted under the name "超特急☆-BULLET TRAIN- (Chōtokkyū☆-BULLET TRAIN-)" but later changed the name to "超特急 (Chōtokkyū)". The group consists of "main dancers" and "back vocalists", meaning that the vocalists stand behind the dancers when the band is performing. Bullet Train has been likened to Momoiro Clover Z, an idol girl group managed by the same talent agency. Consisting of 4 main dancers, the center among the dancers changes for each single. In 2018 they won their first award on MAMA2018 in Japan.

== Members ==
=== Current ===
As of August 2022, the group consists of 9 members.

- Kai (カイ) / Kai Ogasawara (小笠原 海) - 27 September 1994 - Main Dancer - Blue - Mysterious
- Ryoga (リョウガ) / Ryōga Funatsu (船津 稜雅) - Leader - 23 October 1994 - Main Dancer - Purple - Skinny
- Takuya (タクヤ) / Takuya Kusakawa (草川 拓弥) - 24 November 1994 - Main Dancer - Green - Muscle
- Yuki (ユーキ) / Yūki Murata (村田 祐基) - Former Leader - 2 January 1995 - Main Dancer - Red - Clumsy
- Takashi (タカシ) / Takashi Matsuo (松尾 太陽) - 23 September 1996 - Backup Vocal -White -Youngest Child (Takashi was the youngest member before Haru joined the group)
- Shuya (シューヤ) / Shūya Shimura (志村秀哉) - 25 March 1995 - Backup Vocal
- Masahiro (マサヒロ) / Masahiro Moritsugu (森次政裕) - 15 September 1998 - Main Dancer
- Aloha (アロハ) / Aloha Takamatsu (髙松アロハ) - 26 October 2000 - Main Dancer
- Haru (ハル) / Haru Kashiwagi (柏木悠) - 31 March 2005 - Main Dancer

=== Former ===
- Sho (ショウ) / Shō Takemura (竹村翔)
- Koichi (コーイチ) / Kōichi Yoshino (吉野晃一) - 18 June 1994 - Backup Vocal - Black
- Yusuke (ユースケ) / Yūsuke Fukuda (福田佑亮) - 24 December 1995 - Main Dancer - Yellow

== Discography ==
=== Albums ===
List of studio albums, with selected chart positions and sales
Title	Album details	Peak	Sales
Title	Album details	JPN	Sales
Ring	Released: December 3, 2014; Label: SDR; Formats: CD, CD+DVD, CD+Blu-ray, digital download	7	JPN: 18,986
Dramatic Seven	Released: October 26, 2016; Label: SDR; Formats: CD, CD+Blu-ray, digital download	4	JPN: 41,714
Golden Epoch	Released: November 14, 2018; Label: SDR; Formats: CD, CD+Blu-ray, digital download	2	
Dance Dance Dance	Released: November 22, 2021; Label: SDR; Formats: CD, CD+Blu-ray, digital download	7	
B9	Released: March 22, 2023; Label: SDR; Formats: CD, digital download	2	JPN: 59,134

=== EPs ===
List of EPs, with selected chart positions and sales
Title	EP details	Peak	Sales
Title	EP details	JPN	Sales
Just Like Bullet Train (Just Like 超特急)	Released: April 17, 2024; Label: SDR; Formats: CD, digital download	2	JPN: 50,011
Why Don't You Bullet Train? (Why Don't You 超特急?)	Released: May 7, 2025; Label: SDR, Polydor; Formats: CD, digital download	1	JPN: 153,708

=== Singles ===
List of singles, with selected chart positions and sales
No.	Title	Year	Peak	Sales	Album
No.	Title	Year	JPN	Sales	Album
1	"Train"	2012	—	—	Non-album singles
2	"Shake Body"	2012	126	JPN: 560	Non-album singles
3	"Policemen"	2013	18	JPN: 3,597	Non-album singles
4	"Bloody Night"	2013	10	JPN: 11,831	Ring
—	"Starlight" (As Ultra Bullet Train)	2013	7	JPN: 11,119	Ring
5	"Kiss Me Baby"	2013	8	JPN: 21,822	Ring
6	"Ikki!!!!!i!!"	2014	4	JPN: 32,157	Ring
7	"Believe×Believe"	2014	6	JPN: 32,748	Ring
8	"Star Gear"	2014	7	JPN: 37,943	Ring
8	"Ebiday Ebinai"	2014	7	JPN: 37,943	Ring
8	"Burn!"	2014	7	JPN: 37,943	Non-album single
9	"Stardust Love Train"	2015	5	JPN: 24,578	Dramatic Seven
9	"Battaman"	2015	5	JPN: 24,578	Dramatic Seven
10	"Beautiful Chaser"	2015	2	JPN: 48,924	Dramatic Seven
11	"Yell"	2016	4	JPN: 27,059	Dramatic Seven
12	"Chō Never Give Up Dance" (超ネバギバDANCE)	2017	1	JPN: 72,544	Golden Epoch
13	"My Buddy"	2017	2	JPN: 86,981	Golden Epoch
14	"A Kind of Love"	2018	2	JPN: 98,041	Golden Epoch
15	"Jesus"	2018	3	JPN: 34,559	Golden Epoch
—	"Soleil"	2019	—		Non-album singles
16	"Hey Hey Hey"	2019	4		Non-album singles
17	"Revival Love"	2019	3		Non-album singles
18	"Stand Up"	2020	2		Non-album singles
19	"Asayake"	2020	10		Non-album singles
20	"Uchū Drive" (宇宙ドライブ)	2022	2		B9
21	"AwA AwA"	2024	1		TBA
22	"Nine Lives"	2025	1	JPN: 287,172	TBA
23	"Gachi Muchū!" (ガチ夢中！)	2026	1	JPN: 470,172	TBA
24	"Etrance Fever" (エトランス・フィーバー)	2026	TBA	JPN: TBA	TBA

=== Digital singles ===
Year	Single	Album
2020	"Dear My Goodbye" (Dear My グッバイ)	Non-album singles
2021	"Guilty" as Bullet Pink	Non-album singles
2021	"Carnaval"	Dance Dance Dance
2021	"Kachi Kaja" (같이 가자)	Dance Dance Dance
2022	"Cresendo" (クレッシェンド)	Non-album single
