= List of Ultraman Tiga characters =

Ultraman Tiga (ウルトラマンティガ, Urutoraman Tiga) is a Japanese tokusatsu TV show and is the 11th show in the Ultra Series. Produced by Tsuburaya Productions, Ultraman Tiga was aired at 6:00pm and aired between September 7, 1996, to August 30, 1997. Following Tiga's conclusion, the series was succeeded by Ultraman Dyna (ウルトラマンダイナ, Urutoraman Daina) from September 5, 1997, until August 28, 1998.

== Protagonists ==
=== Shin Asuka ===
Shin Asuka (アスカ・シン, Asuka Shin) is the main protagonist of Ultraman Dyna and is Ultraman Dyna's human host. Aged 22 years old in the series, he is light-hearted overall, and is one of the rare Ultra human hosts who also serves as the comic relief of the main cast. Asuka often whines and pouts immaturely, and sometimes pretends to be killed in combat just to see his teammates freak out. Despite his immature outlook, he can also be headstrong and overly courageous, fending off aliens far stronger than normal humans with only his hand-to-hand combat skills. His well-known motto is "Never give up", stemming from his character development as his series progresses. Using the Lieflasher (リーフラッシャー, Rīfurasshā), he transforms into Ultraman Dyna by raising the object in mid-air.

During his childhood, Asuka's dad disappeared years ago when his space ship disappeared into a mysterious light. He spent his teenage years in high school as a baseball player and later on worked as a TPC maintenance crew in The Final Odyssey, saluting Daigo, who in fact his own predecessor. After enlisting himself as a ZERO Training student, he was accepted into the Super GUTS for being able to score high marks during their entry examination and saving Ryo from the Spheres by sacrificing his own GUTS Wing. During that time, he came in contact with Dyna's light and while fighting Darambia on Mars, this introduced Dyna for the first time. Although hesitating to use it again, he was able to overcome it quickly, embracing his duty as an Ultra Warrior like Daigo and fight against multiple monster and alien threats. In the three-part final episode, his identity as Ultraman Dyna was leaked and kidnapped by the Black Buster Squad to awaken the artificial Ultraman Terranoid, which eventually went rogue from Sphere's takeover. His kidnapper Gondo redeemed himself by sacrificing his life to replenish Dyna's energy and defeated Zeluganoid but Asuka collapsed from his injuries and was taken care by his predecessor, Daigo before Ryo picked him again. When Super GUTS unleashed a full campaign against Gransphere, he saved Ryo as Dyna from being held hostage by Neo Gaigaraid but during this point that his identity made known to his teammates. Despite Gransphere defeated by Super GUTS and Dyna's combined tactics, the battle came at a high price, forcefully dragging both Asuka and Dyna into a wormhole. While presumed dead, he was actually reunited with his long lost father and the two fly towards the space-time continuum, with Asuka eventually reappearing in subsequent Ultra Series installments.

Shin Asuka is portrayed by Takeshi Tsuruno (つるの 剛士, Tsuruno Takeshi) and Shunji Matsuzaki (松崎 駿司, Matsuzaki Shunji) in his childhood. Tsuruno is a fan of Ultraman 80, watching the series in his childhood and was once mistaken that said Ultraman would appear in Superior Ultraman 8 Brothers before Hiroshi Nagano corrected him. The original concept behind Shin Asuka is to have him as a baseball player but this was less focused due to Tsuruno having intermediate experience as a baseball player. His acting as Asuka left a huge impression to his eldest son, who has a habit of saying that his father's job is an Ultraman whenever people asked about it. While acting as Asuka, Tsuruno was reminded to portray himself as a teenager growing up. The props used to portray Asuka, such as his Super GUTS uniform and Lieflasher was nicely preserved under Tsuruno's own request, having expected to reprise his character in later years. Since Ultraman Dyna is a show that focuses on space, this left an inspiration to Tsuruno for his interest for astronomy.

== GUTS ==
The Special Investigation Team GUTS (特捜チームGUTS, Tokusō Chīmu Gattsu; Global Unlimited Task Squad) is the main attack team in Ultraman Tiga . Originally specializes in search and rescue, the team was changed into a monster attack team after frequent appearances of monster attacks, starting from Golza and Melba. The team eventually disbanded sometime after the events of The Final Odyssey and later on succeeded by Super GUTS in Ultraman Dyna.

Members

- Megumi Iruma (イルマ・メグミ, Iruma Megumi): Aged 36 years old. The first female captain in the Ultra Series, she has a commanding yet motherly presence. She mostly stays in headquarters and leaves field operations in the capable hands of her deputy captain, Munakata, who is her close friend during their days in military defense force. Her influence makes GUTS perhaps less militant than some of her superiors over at TPC, which provides some opportunities for dramatic tension. She used to be a scientist and she is also a widow a son living with her mother-in-law after her husband died in an accident. The Final Odyssey revealed her to be the reincarnation of Yuzare, who emerged from Iruma's body to prevent the Dark Giants' Shibito-Zoigers from escaping. In Ultraman Dyna, she has become one of the TPC's chiefs of staff, making cameo appearances in episode 36. Her appearance in Ultraman Tiga and Ultraman Dyna involves riding a GUTS Wing to participate in the fight against Queen Monera after Dyna was killed in action before Tiga returned and saved the former giant. Her final appearance in episode 49 revealed to Super GUTS of TPC chief of staff Gondo in his attempt to re-invoke plan F for military purpose, therefore exposing his crime beforehand. She is portrayed by Mio Takaki (高樹 澪, Takaki Mio).
- Seiichi Munakata (ムナカタ・セイイチ, Munakata Seiichi): Aged 33 years old and the no-nonsense deputy captain of GUTS. He was saved by Iruma back in his days on the defense force. A teetotaler who has a penchant for drinking milk at jazz bars and wearing a baseball cap in the field. In Ultraman Dyna, he is transferred to the TPC West Asia branch after GUTS had been disbanded but returned to Japan to help Super GUTS members in against Neo Geomos. He is portrayed by Akitoshi Ohtaki (大滝 明利, Ōtaki Akitoshi). Munakata's teetotaler traits is due to his own actor.
- Rena Yanase (ヤナセ・レナ, Yanase Rena): Aged 22 years old. An ace pilot and no stranger to using heavy machines and artillery, as well as happens to have compassion for some of the monsters. She has a rather strained relationship with her father Omi Yanase, who divorced with her mother while she was 9 years old. After a series of events, she becomes aware of Ultraman Tiga's identity, and figures out that Daigo is Tiga and witnesses Daigo transform in front of her in episode 50. After The Final Odyssey incidents, both her and Daigo settled their lives in Mars and had two children, the eldest daughter Hikari and youngest son Tsubasa. Both her and Hikari briefly returned to Earth in Ultraman Tiga and Ultraman Dyna to visit Iruma and made their second appearance in Dyna's penultimate episode, nursing an injured Asuka to health. She is portrayed by Takami Yoshimoto (吉本 多香美, Yoshimoto Takami), who is the daughter of Susumu Kurobe, the actor of Shin Hayata/Ultraman from 1966 series Ultraman.
- Masami Horii (ホリイ・マサミ, Horii Masami): Aged 28 years old and is known as the "Brains of GUTS" with his genius. He speaks in an Osaka-dialect and has no hesitation to save others even if it costs him his own life. He met Michiru Ezaki, the daughter of Dr. Ezaki from Ligatron incident after saving her from Magnia Parasites and the two eventually married near the season climax. In Ultraman Dyna, he was revealed to have fathered two children from his marriage. He is portrayed by Yukio Masuda (増田 由紀夫, Masuda Yukio).
- Tetsuo Shinjoh (シンジョウ・テツオ, Shinjō Tetsuo): Aged 26 years old and the team's main sniper and second ace pilot to Rena, having graduated from the same flight school. He is sometimes brash and hotheaded, but is fearful of supernaturals. He has formed a goofball combination with either Daigo or Horii. He is portrayed by Shigeki Kagemaru (影丸 茂樹, Kagemaru Shigeki).
- Jun Yazumi (ヤズミ・ジュン, Yazumi Jun): Aged 18 years old. The communications and computer expert who goes out into the field even less than Captain Iruma. Yazumi discovers that the name is an old popular name of a northeastern district in Japan. Rena usually tends to treat him as a younger brother alike. He returned in the final episode of Ultraman Dyna, having revealed to be the chief of TPC Ganymede base in Jupiter. He assisted the Super GUTS members in their campaign against Gransphere. He is portrayed by Yoichi Furuya (古屋 暢一, Furuya Yōichi).

Mechas and Vehicles

Before the rising age of monster attacks, most of GUTS Ride Mechas (ライドメカ, Raido Meka) are meant to be rescue vehicles.

- GUTS Wing 1 (ガッツウイング1号, Gattsu Uingu Ichi-gō; GW-01): An advanced fighter with variable-sweep wings. Originally a rescue aircraft armed with signal flares, it was upgraded with laser beams and enhanced speed for combat against monster threats. This fighter had the most succeeding models after it. In the Neo Frontier Era (Ultraman Dyna), despite being lag behind due to the appearance of more successive fighter models and variations, the GUTS Wing is still affordable to be used and some of them served as training vehicles for cadets of Training School ZERO. The GUTS Wing 1 and its succeeding variations are based on a squid.
- GUTS Wing 2 (ガッツウイング2号, Gattsu Uingu Ni-gō; GW-02): A four-seater VTOL, which possess enhanced firepower at the cost of speed. Its main weapon is the Hyper Railgun (ハイパーレールガン, Haipā Rērugan) that can launch the Dexas Beam (デキサスビーム, Dekisasu Bīmu). (Note: In the English Dub, Dexas Beam is named as Vitro Cannon.) It can also be remotely controlled for a person to utilize its Hyper Railgun properly, as this was used by Yazumi in episode 36 to attack Goldras. This jet wasn't much shown in Ultraman Dyna due to the arrival of newer aircraft models, though one was briefly shown in episode 32 of the series, which was quickly assimilated by Lovemos into Satan Lovemos. GUTS Wing 2's design is themed after a crayfish's pincher.
- GUTS Wing EX-J (Extra-Jet) (ガッツウイングEX-J（エクストラジェット）, Gattsu Uingu Ekusutora Jetto; GW-EXJ): Debuted in episode 41 of Ultraman Tiga. A heavily modified version of the GUTS Wing 2, it can split into EX-J α (Alpha) and EX-J β (Beta). This jet made its return in episode 35 of Ultraman Dyna, revealing that either the old model was relocated or another unit was placed in the TPC West Asia branch. This was piloted by Munakata to join Super GUTS and his old teammates Horii and Shinjoh in against Neo Geomos, armed with an improvised Anti Maxima gun.
  - Alpha: The small jet on the front, which possess a flamethrower and a Hyper Cold Beam (ハイパーコールドビーム, Haipā Kōrudo Bīmu).
  - Beta: The remodeled part of GUTS Wing 2, which possess a laser cannon and a Hyper Melt Gun (ハイパーメルトガン, Haipā Meruto Gan).
- Snow White (スノーホワイト, Sunō Howaito): First appeared in episode 19, a customized GUTS Wing 1 designed for Maxima Overdrive. This jet only possess five ammunitions due to its sole focus being on speed. Originally named GUTS Wing Tester (ガッツウイング試験機, Gattsu Uingu Shiken-ki), it was renamed Snow White by Rena in episode 50.
- Artdessei (アートデッセイ号, Ātodessei-gō): First appeared in episode 19 of Ultraman Tiga. Originally built in secret within the F4 docking bay, basement no. 133 of the Dive Hangar by Dr. Yaban Nao during his research in Maxima Overdrive. Large enough to load 3 GUTS Wings, the Artdessei is a space-flight-capable carrier and battleship. Aside from standard laser beam cannon armament, it is also equipped with the Deluc Cannon (デラック砲, Derakku-hō) that attached to the Maxima engine power source. The battleship was used to transport the Dive Hangar workers when Gatanothor's darkness invaded the base. Its final sortie was in The Final Odyssey in a raid on R'lyeh to fight against the Dark Giants and saved both Daigo/Tiga and Iruma. As revealed in Ultraman Dyna episode 32, it was among those stored within TPC's Grandome (also Super GUTS' base) and likewise was assimilated by Lovemos into Satan Lovemos.
- Sherlock (シャーロック, Shārokku): (Note: Known as the "GUTS Runner" in 4Kids English dub.) A modified Chevrolet Camaro, equipped with cannons above the roof.
- De La Mu (デ・ラ・ム, De Ra Mu): (Note: Known as the "GUTS Thruster" in 4Kids English dub.) A modified Chevrolet Blazer made for off-road purposes, equipped with Degner (デグナー, Degunā) cannon on the roof.
- Peepar (ピーパー, Pīpā): (Note: Known as the "Weevil" in 4Kids English dub.) A four-seater drilling tank equipped with the Spindler (スピンドラー, Supindorā) drill for subterranean exploration and combat. Its main offensive weapons are Fuser Z (フューザーZ, Fyūzā Zetto) heat ray and Cold Beam (コールドビーム, Kōrudo Bīmu), as well as the Monster Catcher (モンスターキャッチャー, Monsutā Kyatchā) to properly track down pinpointed targets.
- Dolphar-202 (ドルファー202, Dorufā Ni Maru Ni): A six-seater submarine used for underwater missions. Its main armaments are Monroe (モンロー, Monrō) missiles and D cannons.
- Stug (スタッグ, Sutaggu): (Note: Known as the "GUTS Cycles" in 4Kids English dub.) A pair of modified motorcycles made by Horii for routine patrol. These vehicles made no appearances in Ultraman Dyna as Super GUTS prefers the use of cars to get around on land. Two models existed with different purposes:
  - 1: Made for on-road type.
  - 2: Made for off-road type.

== Super GUTS ==
The Special Investigation Team Super GUTS (特捜チームスーパーGUTS, Tokusō Chīmu Sūpā Gatsu), abbreviated as S-GUTS, is the main attack team of Ultraman Dyna and the direct successor of GUTS, formed in the Neo Frontier Era (2017). Their main catchphrase is the English word "Roger!" (ラジャー!, Rajā!) when receiving orders, followed by the thumbs up gesture. Like GUTS, this group also had its branches from around the world in conjunction to the TPC. In Ultraman Tiga The Final Odyssey, most of Super GUTS members made their cameo appearances as Zero Training Squad, helping out the Artdessei crew in R'lyeh, while Nakajima worked in TPC Science division and Mai at that time still a middle school student. 15 after Asuka's sacrifice (2032) in Ultraman Saga, the Japanese branch of Super GUTS were transferred to the Mars division, with many of its members promoted to higher ranks. In Ultraman Tiga Gaiden (2038), the group is once more succeeded by Neo Super GUTS.

Members

- Gousuke Hibiki (ヒビキ・ゴウスケ, Hibiki Gōsuke): Aged 46 years old and the team captain. He is loud and boisterous, often joking with his subordinates and shouting orders. At the same time, however, he is a caring leader with a good heart and good intentions for Super GUTS. Back in the era of Ultraman Tiga, he worked as a TPC officer who participated in the evacuation of villagers when Fire Golza attacked. During the series, he is the only Super GUTS member to have married and had a daughter. In Ultraman Tiga and Ultraman Dyna movie, he had a short meeting with former GUTS captain Iruma, where both hinted Dyna's true identity as Asuka. In Ultraman Saga, he has been promoted to the TPC General and is last seen delivering a speech for the 15th anniversary for Asuka's sacrifice. He is portrayed by Ryo Kinomoto (木之元 亮, Kinomoto Ryō).
- Toshiyuki Kohda (コウダ・トシユキ, Kōda Toshiyuki): Aged 34 years old. He usually takes the front step in various operations and eventually promoted to the rank Sub-Captain in episode 34. He is usually at odds with Asuka due to the latter's recklessness. In episode 30, he was briefly shown practicing Kendama. 15 years after the series finale in Ultraman Saga, he was promoted to the TPC Space Development Agency. Unlike original TPC staff uniforms, his was colored dark blue. He is portrayed by Toshikazu Fukawa (布川 敏和, Fukawa Toshikazu).
- Ryo Yumimura (ユミムラ・リョウ, Yumimura Ryō): Aged 27 years old. The tomboy ace pilot of Super GUTS, who is usually at odds with Asuka for his goof ball antics and recklessness, while ironically were partnered with each other during certain missions. She usually gives moral support to inexperienced and weak-willed person, such as her childhood friend Hirao and teammate Mai, going as far as to picking up fights with any of her teammates should they belittle the latter. Ryo is slightly cross-eyed, which adds charm for her and wears sunglasses when piloting. While episode 28 revealed that she still had her parents, the Ultraman Dyna novel from 1998 revealed that she was orphaned as a child and live the remainder of her childhood with her adopted parents. Ryo views Shinjoh of GUTS as her senior and inspiration. In Ultraman Saga, she is promoted to the Captain of Super GUTS Mars division, watching over the team's new rookie member Taiga. She is portrayed by Risa Saito (斉藤 りさ, Saitō Risa) and Eri Kitamura (喜多村 英梨, Kitamura Eri) (Note: Credited under name Eri Okamura (岡村 英梨, Okamura Eri)) during her childhood.
- Kouhei Kariya (カリヤ・コウヘイ, Kariya Kōhei): Aged 28 years old. An expert of shooting of the Super GUTS and is well versed in archaeology. This kind of knowledge proves beneficial in episodes 21 and 28. His favorite drink is coffee, which he usually drinks in his silver TPC mug. In the series, his hairstyle is dubbed as "Kariya Hair" (カリヤヘア, Kariya Hea) due to its inability to change in most situations, making the viewers suspect if his actor wears a wig. 15 years later in Ultraman Saga, he is promoted to the rank of sub-captain of Super GUTS Mars Division and was shown maintaining his fixation drinking coffee on his TPC mug. He is portrayed by Takao Kase (加瀬 尊朗, Kase Takao).
- Tsutomu Nakajima (ナカジマ・ツトム, Nakajima Tsutomu): Aged 29, and is the pudgy technician and researcher of the Super GUTS team. He often becomes panicked or overly serious and his favorite food is fried chicken. His GUTS senior is Masami Horii, both having cooperated once to implant a tracker on Geomos during its attack on Osaka. While piloting Guts Eagle Beta, he usually seats at the back. His specialty in the scientific field are Biology and Astrophysics. 15 years later in Ultraman Saga, he is promoted to the principal of science team in Super GUTS Mars Division, planning to build an aircraft with Neo Maxima properties that enough to catch up with Asuka. He is portrayed by Joe Onodera (小野寺 丈, Onodera Jō).
- Mai Midorikawa (ミドリカワ・マイ, Midorikawa Mai): Aged 18 years old and originated from Aichi Prefecture. A cute, bubbly, loud cadet-type with little combat experience, Mai mostly serves as the communication person and stays behind at the base. Usually tying her hair, Mai's hairstyle changes to short as of episode 31 and briefly in Ultraman Dyna: Return of Hanejiro has a long red hair. (Note: Ultraman Dyna: Return of Hanejiro was filmed three years after Ultraman Dyna had finished being broadcast.) She has multiple crushes (baseball players, cute exploratory robots, bike racers, etc.), gets people's attention by saying 'neh-neh-neh,' and has the amazing ability to hide multiple items behind her back, only to whip them out in rapid succession. Her GUTS senior is Jun Yazumi. She is portrayed by Mariya Yamada (山田 まりや, Yamada Mariya). In episode 47, Mai was revealed to have a younger brother named Hiroki, who in turn portrayed by Mariya's real life younger brother. Her cameo in Ultraman Tiga: The Final Odyssey was a last minute addition requested by her actress. Because of Mariya's pregnancy at that time, she wasn't able to reprise her role as Mai in Ultraman Saga. The Complete Works Magazine revealed that Mai is currently a ZERO Training School instructor.
- Stray Creature Hanejiro (迷子珍獣 ハネジロー, Maigo Chinjū Hanejirō; 11 – 47): A strange alien which Asuka befriended on a mission to Planet Merani, it first helped Asuka (as Dyna) by pointing out a monster's weak spot during a battle, and was since made Super GUTS' "mascot" of sorts. Its name was suggested by Asuka due to noticing Hanejiro's wings. (Note: Comes from the word "Hane" (羽根; Insect wings).) Hanejiro knows of Asuka's true identity as Dyna but is incapable of telling this to the Super GUTS members. In episode 47, Hanejiro was revealed to be the Alien Fabiras' guardian angel Mukitto (ムーキット, Mūkitto) and eventually choose to return to Planet Fabiras with them. This was a heartbreaking farewell to Super GUTS, especially Asuka himself. Hanejiro briefly returned to Earth in Ultraman Dyna: Return of Hanejiro in order to warn Super GUTS of Alien Dehadoh's invasion but found itself late as Dyna was frozen by One-Z until it was assisted by Super GUTS and the Alien Miji to free Dyna. After Asuka's awakening from his coma, Hanejiro quickly greeted the former. Hanejiro is voiced by Junko Kawashima (河島 順子, Kawashima Junko) in the series and Junko Aoki (青木 順子, Aoki Junko) in the OV. Originally it was meant to be named as "Pam" (パム, Pamu), based on its repeated phrase but was quickly renamed due to copyright violation.

Ride Mechas and Vehicles

- GUTS Eagle (ガッツイーグル, Gattsu Īguru): An aircraft capable of operating in both atmospheric and zero gravity environment, the GUTS Eagle possesses the Neo Maxima engine for propulsion. There were two models available, one was situated in the TPC Far East Headquarters Grandome (also Super GUTS base) and Cliomos Island. Its main attack is Tornado Thunder (トルネードサンダー, Torunēdo Sandā) energy beam fired from its nosecone. Optionally, it can also armed with a jet wire to lift objects or carrying GUTS Dig and GUTS Marine. In desperate situation, the GUTS Eagle can initiate Formation 3 (フォーメーション3, Fōmēshon Surī), separating into three components. The GUTS Eagle altogether is based on the Ultra Hawk 1 from Ultra Seven.
  - GUTS Eagle Alpha (ガッツイーグルα号, Gattsu Īguru Arufa-gō): Also called as Eagle Jet (イーグルジェット, Īguru Jetto), it is armed with heatray lasers. Although being a two-seater jet, it was mostly rode by Asuka until he left it in favor of GUTS Eagle Alpha Superior in episode 33, leaving the former jet seldom in use during certain situations. In Ultraman Saga, it was used by Nozomu Taiga in an aerial combat against Sphere forces before his interdimensional abduction by Alien Bat. GUTS Eagle Alpha is based on the Mini VTOL from Ultraman and Ultra Hawk 1 Beta from Ultra Seven.
  - GUTS Eagle Beta (ガッツイーグルβ号, Gattsu Īguru Beta-gō): Also called as Eagle Wing (イーグルウイング, Īguru Uingu), it is armed with Volcannon (ボルキャノン, Borukyanon) and can optionally equipped with grenades, water bombs, rocket launcher and turrets. The jet is a four-seater and is usually piloted by commanding members of Super GUTS, Hibiki and Kohda.
  - GUTS Eagle Gamma (ガッツイーグルγ号, Gattsu Īguru Gamma-gō): Also called as Eagle Guy (イーグルガイ, Īguru Gai), it is armed with the Gyner (ガイナー, Gainā) cannon on its nose and several tracking missile and cooling missile. This jet is a two-seater and is usually piloted by Ryo.
- GUTS Eagle Alpha Superior (ガッツイーグルアルファS, Gattsu Īguru Arufa Superioru): First appeared in episode 33, which excels in speed. Its true potential lies upon the capability of aerobatics and accurate precision in firing. Its main armaments are Neo Sieg (ネオジーク, Neo Jīku) on the front wing and Spark Bomber (スパークボンバー, Supāku Bonbā) on the back wing. The jet was piloted by Asuka in favor from the GUTS Eagle Alpha. He also piloted it after both him and Dyna were sucked into a wormhole as a result of their victory over Gransphere and flew together with his long lost father in the wormhole. The Alpha Superior was revealed to have mass-produced as of year 2038 in Ultraman Tiga Gaiden and utilized as training jets for rookies of Neo Super GUTS. One aircraft was piloted by Tsubasa Madoka, who eventually time-slipped into the Jōmon Period of Japan by the sorcerer Dogramagma, crashing into the Sakimori Village before he return to his proper time by fixing the jet.
  - GUTS Eagle Superior (ガッツイーグルS, Gattsu Īguru Superioru): A GUTS Eagle combination made by replacing Alpha with Alpha Superior. Its only sortie was in Bazob and Yumenokatamari confrontation. Flight performance is enhanced and can also unleash a stronger Tornado Thunder attack.
- Connery 07 (コネリー07, Konerī Zero Sebun): A two-seater search and rescue aircraft. It also functions by monitoring monster activities and delivering GUTS Dig to remote areas.
- GUTS Marine (ガッツマリン, Gattsu Marin): A special submarine used for underwater combat, rescue and reconnaissance. Its left and right sides are manipulators in underwater travel and is equipped with Brake Shark (ブレイクシャーク, Bureiku Shāku) missiles.
- GUTS Dig (ガッツディグ, Gattsu Digu): A four-seater driller and is the direct successor of GUTS' Peepar. Its Spindler drill cone can emit Atomic Thunder (アトミックサンダー, Atomikku Sandā) beam.
- Clarkov NF-3000 (クラーコフNF-3000, Kurākofu Enu Efu Sanzen): First appeared in episode 6 and had made a total appearance of 8 episodes in the series. An all-terrain exploration vehicle capable of large scale research (possessing a portable lab), investigation and mobile combat base. For defensive purposes, it has the Gyuvern Cannon (ギューベルン砲, Gyūberun-hō) and flies with the Maxima Overdrive engine. In episode 25 and 26, it was hijacked by Spume to draw the artificial sun NSP Campanella and melt the South Pole before Super GUTS and Dyna stopped it in time. In episode 35, a Sphere fragment from Pluto assimilated with one of its Neo Maxima engine before forming into the synthetic monster Geomos. In the final episode, Clarkov was equipped with Professor Rui Kisaragi's Neo Maxima cannon to help Dyna defeating Gransphire.
- Zeretto (ゼレット): A Fifth generation Honda Prelude patrol car for routine patrol, usually ride by Asuka and Ryo. It is armed with Zerarian Cannons (ゼラリアン砲, Zerarian-hō) on its roof.
- Bopper (ボッパー, Boppā): An all-terrain First generation Honda CR-V equipped with Bounty Cannons (バウンティ砲, Baunti-hō) on the roof. Despite being slower than the Zeretto, it has greater firepower and capable of resisting impacts.

== TPC ==
Terrestrial Peaceable Consortium (地球平和連合, Chikyū Heiwa Rengō; TPC) is an organization that founded by Sawai during his time as the secretary general of the United Nations back in the 20th century (2005). (Note: Known as the Terrestrial Peacekeeping Commission in the 4Kids English dub.) The organization specializes in technology development and innovation, which continued to the terraformation of Mars during the Neo Frontier era (2017).

=== Far East Headquarters (Japan) ===
Ultraman Tiga Era

Both the TPC headquarters and the GUTS command centre were situated at the Dive Hangar (ダイブハンガー, Daibu Hangā) in Bōsō Peninsula, Chiba Prefecture, Japan. The Dive Hangar had been constructed since 2001 as a defense force base and was given to TPC after the old defense team disbanded. As its name suggests, the base is capable of sinking itself into the surface and submerged when needed. Its huge size houses about 3,000 workers including GUTS members and TPC executives and is large enough to store an entire possession of GUTS' Ride Mechas. Underneath the F4 docking bay, basement No. 133 houses the Maxima Overdrive-powered battleship Artdessei that was secretly built by Dr. Yao Naban. The base was intruded by various antagonist of the series such as Bizaamo, Menjula and among others. It suffered a great deal of damage when Gatanothor's darkness spreads through the base but was repaired as of The Final Odyssey. Despite no longer being TPC Japan branch's base of operations, the base still served its purpose in Ultraman Dyna, evidenced in episode 42.

- Inspector General Sōichiro Sawai (サワイ・ソウイチロウ総監, Sawai Sōichirō-sōkan): The head and founder of the TPC, and a strong advocate of GUTS. A pacifist at heart, but also a rationalist in the face of the dangers that face humanity. Advocated the formation of TPC when he was the secretary general of the United Nations back in the 20th century. Often participates in field operations and also dedicated to contacting extraterrestrial life. He is rather informal towards Daigo, having recruited the boy to GUTS due to the former being rescued in a failed kidnapping attempt by an alien invader. In Ultraman Dyna, his position was succeeded by Koki Fukami and is currently the TPC advisor after stepping down from his position due to health problems. He is portrayed by Tamio Kawachi (川地 民夫, Kawachi Tamio).
- Chief of Staff Officer Masayuki Nahara (ナハラ・マサユキ参謀, Nahara Masayuki-sanbō): A gentleman of principle who avoids confrontation. He likes to put the break on reckless military buildups. In Ultraman Dyna, he was revealed to have been transferred to the TPC West Asia branch with Munakata and in episode 36, gives Munakata the orders to assist Super GUTS, Horii and Shinjoh in against Neo Geomos. He is portrayed by Uketa Take (タケ・ウケタ, Take Uketa).
- Military Police Director General Tetsuji Yoshioka (ヨシオカ・テツジ警務局長官, Yoshioka Tetsuji-keimu-kyoku-chōkan): He is responsible for the enforcement arm of TPC. A war hawk, but also an old friend of pacifist Sawai. Often disagrees with Nahara, but never acts irrationally. A former submariner. He likes to carry and use a traditional folding Japanese fan. He is portrayed by Ken Okabe (岡部 健, Okabe Ken).
- Mayumi Shinjoh (シンジョウ・マユミ, Shinjō Mayumi): Shinjoh's 19-year-old little sister that works as a nurse in TPC. Her boyfriend Takuma Aoki died in episode 15. She joined the organization with the help of her older brother, and she sometimes has great sibling-type arguments with him. In Ultraman Dyna, she was promoted to the rank of Head Nurse of the TPC. She is portrayed by Kei Ishibashi (石橋 けい, Ishibashi Kei).
- Professor Naban Yao (ヤオ・ナバン博士, Yao Naban-hakase): The founder of Maxima Overdrive, which can harness the power of light. A scientist at heart, he continues to pursue the dreams of his childhood. It takes him 20 years to turn his dream of creating the greatest ship ever into a reality (in the form of the Artdessei). He is portrayed by Ichirō Ogura (小倉 一郎, Ogura Ichirō).
- Professor Reiko Kashimura (カシムラ・レイコ博士, Kashimura Reiko-hakase): The head of TPC's "Ride Mecha" R and D. She made several appearances in the first half of the Ultraman Tiga series. She participates in the analysis of Yuzare's time capsule, and the modification of GUTS mecha to combat. Her last appearance was in episode 18 of Ultraman Tiga and had also appeared in Ultraman Dyna. She is portrayed by Takako Kitagawa (北川 たか子, Kitagawa Takako).
- Professor Yuuji Tango (タンゴ・ユウジ博士, Tango Yūji-hakase): An army scientist from TPC's Life Sciences Research division. He is small at heart but full of pride. He spends time analyzing the remains of the Tiga statues. His insecurities eventually lead him to trouble. He was actually working for Keigo Masaki, helping him in utilizing Evil Tiga's power until he fell into a nervous breakdown when Evil Tiga ran amok, proving that Masaki failed in his attempt to control the power of an ancient giant of light. He is portrayed by Yoichi Okamura (岡村 洋一, Okamura Yoichi).
- Mitsukuni Shizuma: See here

Ultraman Dyna Era

Although the Dive Hangar was rebuilt after its damage by Gatanothor's darkness, hard lessons were learned from that day, leading to the construction of Grandome (グランドーム, Gurandōmu) within the mountains of Japan. This base serve as the new building for Japanese branch of TPC and just like the Dive Hangar, it also has an underground base. The Grandome can simply be elongated into a tower, mainly for launching the Super GUTS mechas. Its foothills possess energy reservation base with tight security turrets. Aside from just housing Super GUTS' main mechas, it also contains GUTS' old Ride Mechas, as revealed in episode 32 when TPC's possessed-exploratory robot Lovemos assimilated with every of their Ride Mechas into Satan Lovemos.

- Inspector General Koki Fukami (フカミ・コウキ総監, Fukami Kōki-sōkan): The second head of the TPC, succeeding Sawai after his illness forced him to step down into the adviser. Fukami greatly idolizes Sawai and tried his best to follow the path of his predecessor. He is proficient in calligraphy, using it once to name a garbage block monster as "Yumenokatamari". Keeping with the series' lighthearted theme, Fukami can also be comedic at times but shows a serious side in episode 41 when willingly issued the destruction of Gazelle space ship to prevent the monster Diaorius from entering the Earth without regarding its passengers. He is portrayed by Toshiaki Amada (天田 俊明, Amada Toshiaki).
- Chief of Staff Seiji Miyata (ミヤタ・セイジ参謀, Miyata Seiji-sanbō): Fukami's assistant, who usually represented him to give Super GUTS any orders. He was also one of the test pilot of Maxima Overdrive navigation and had once arrived on Planet Gigaru where he met the female alien Churasa. In the present day, his past began to haunt him when the same monster from that planet, Torongar tracked him to Planet Earth. It wasn't until Churasa's spirit guided him and he used her rifle to weaken Torongar long enough for Dyna to finish the monster. He is portrayed by Hiroshi Tsuburaya (円谷 浩, Tsuburaya Hiroshi), one of the grandchild of Eiji Tsuburaya, who was also the first creator of the Ultraman Series, and the third son of Hajime Tsuburaya who became the second creator of the Ultraman Series after Eiji Tsuburaya. He soon portrayed Kenji Tabata in the succeeding series Ultraman Gaia before his death in 2001.
- Chief of Staff Kihachi Gondo (ゴンドウ・キハチ参謀, Gondō Kihachi-sanbō): Affiliated with the Military Police branch, his ideals for peace always lies on the military strength, such as founding the stealth team Black Buster Squad under said branch. In Tiga and Dyna, Gondo and Kisaragi created the TPC Battleship Prometheus but was quickly hijacked by Alien Monera. In episode 49, he was revealed to have secretly reinitiating the frozen Plan F, creating Terranoid and used Asuka's bio-energy to give life to his creation. However, he falls into despair after Terranoid was assimilated by Sphere forces into Zeluganoid and fixed his mistake by sacrificing his own life to replenish Dyna's energy. His wish for his own weapon to save humanity would come true as one of his creations, the Neo Maxima Cannon was utilized by Super GUTS's Clarkov to tear open a wormhole for Dyna to finish off Gransphere. He is portrayed by Shinobu Kameyama (亀山 忍, Kameyama Shinobu).
- Chief of Staff Saeko Shiina (シイナ・サエコ参謀, Shiina Saeko-sanbō): TPC's first female chief of staff and is the direct superior to Iruma, former GUTS captain. During Neo Geomos' rampage, she had the former GUTS deputy captain Munakata sortie to Osaka and assisted Super GUTS and his former colleagues. Shiina is the first to come up with the Sphere's own name. She is portrayed by Yasumi Maezawa (前沢 保美, Maezawa Yasumi).
- Kazuma Asuka (アスカ・カズマ, Asuka Kazuma): Asuka's father, who went disappeared in a Zero Drive navigation test. He only appeared in flashbacks and once in Asuka's illusions when Dyna was frozen by Reigubas. In the final episode, he was revealed to be alive, joining his son when the latter also get sucked into a wormhole and travel towards the space-time continuum. He is portrayed by Daisuke Ryu (隆 大介, Ryū Daisuke).
- Sayaka (サヤカ; 19, 40): A nurse working in TPC Medical Stations under Mayumi. She is portrayed by Saika Tanaka (田中 彩佳, Tanaka Saika), who would portray Saika Ukai in Ultraman Gaia.

=== TPC bases and other organizations ===
Ultraman Tiga Era

- Dr. Ezaki (エザキ博士, Ezaki-hakase; 4): One of the workers of Space Development Department (宇宙開発局, Uchū Kaihatsu-kyoku) and also a passenger of Jupiter 3 before its assimilation into Ligatron. His knowledge was exploited by said monster to steal the confined energies in the base until he and the other passengers fought back before their spirits freed. He is survived by his daughter Michiru, who would later marry GUTS member Horii in episode 47 of Tiga. He is portrayed by Hiroyuki Araya (荒谷 公之, Araya Hiroyuki).
- Space Station Delta (宇宙ステーションデルタ, Uchū Sutēshon Deruta; 7): A space station that orbited the Earth, armed with the Valkyrie Cannon (バルキリー砲, Barukirī-hō).
  - Technical Official Omi Yanase (ヤナセ・オミ技官, Yanase Omi-gikan; 7): Rena's father and the head of Station Delta. He has a strained relationship with Rena at first due to not showing up on her ninth birthday and divorcing with her mother but the two reconciled after he rescued Rena from Alien Reguran. He is portrayed by Shigeru Araki (荒木 しげる, Araki Shigeru).
  - Technical Officer Shigeki Asamiya (アサミヤ・シゲキ技官, Asamiya Shigeki-gikan; 7): Omi Yanase's colleague, who also boarded the Orbiter to Earth. Upon arrival, he was killed by Alien Reguran and his helmet was placed on his memorial by Yanase and his daughter Rena. He is portrayed by Shūichi Ikeda (池田 秀一, Ikeda Shūichi).
- Moon Base Garowa (月面基地ガロワ, Getsumen Kichi Garowa)
  - Captain Shin Hayate (ハヤテ・シン隊長, Hayate Shin-taichō; 48, 51, 52): A poker-faced captain of Garowa and Iruma's old friend who flees to Earth when Garowa is annihilated by monster Menjula. He returned in the finale episodes of Tiga to face against the Zoiger army. In Ultraman Dyna, he is transferred to the Cosmo Adventure Squad and becomes their captain, helping out the Super GUTS in taking out the Ndamoshite X bomb from Alien Chadabin's Mogedon. He is portrayed by Masaki Kyomoto (京本 政樹, Kyōmoto Masaki).
  - Vice Captain Kishinaga (キシナガ副隊長, Kishinaga-fuku-taichō; 48)： The vice captain at Garowa, who also escaped to Earth with Hayate. He is portrayed by Satoshi Furukawa (古河 聰, Furukawa Satoshi).
  - Okabe (オカベ; 48): An officer of Garowa who was among those killed in Menjula's attack. He is portrayed by Yūki Shingo (悠木 真吾, Yūki Shingo).

Ultraman Dyna Era

- Professor Rui Kisaragi (キサラギ・ルイ博士, Kisaragi Rui-hakase): First appeared in Tiga and Dyna movie, she was the development chief of TPC battleship Prometheus under Gondo's instruction. However, she was actually possessed by the Alien Monera to hijack the ship for its Neo Maxima Cannon that eventually transformed into their combat robot Deathfacer. She was released from their trance and was shown among the citizens that donated their light to summon Ultraman Tiga and assist Dyna in defeating Queen Monera. In the series, she works in Jupiter Ganymede Base (ガニメデ基地, Ganimede Kichi) and had locked away the plans for Neo Maxima Cannon due to the Alien Monera incident until she released it again when Super GUTS launched a campaign against Sphere forces, mounting it on their four-legged crawler/spaceship Clarkov. She is portrayed by Aya Sugimoto (杉本 彩, Sugimoto Aya).
- Dr. Ejiri (エジリ博士, Ejiri-hakase; 25, 26): A sarcastic researcher who is responsible for investigating the rising temperature of Antarctica. He is portrayed by Toshio Tomogane (友金 敏雄, Tomogane Toshio), who also played a communication officer in Ultraman Ace.
- Moon Base Garowa:
  - Ryuzou Daimon (ダイモン・リュウゾウ, Daimon Ryuzō; 29): Technical team leader of Garowa that participated in the Zero Drive navigation plan. He initially opposed Asuka's decision to restart the test, fearing his safety but reluctantly gave the boy his approval later on. He is portrayed by Isao Hashimoto (橋本 功, Hashimoto Isao).
  - Heisuke Tokugawa (トクガワ・ヘイスケ, Tokugawa Heisuke; 29): Deputy leader of Garowa base technical team. He is portrayed by Masayoshi Nogami (野上 正義, Nogami Masayoshi).
- Hinoda (ヒノダ; 35): Director of Private Company PWI (民間企業PWI, Minkan Kigyō Pī Daburyū Ai), who assisted Horii in the Cosmo Net. He is portrayed by Jinya Satō (佐藤 仁哉, Satō Jin'ya).

=== Ride mechas, vehicles and other weapons ===
Ultraman Tiga Era

- Executive Transport Aircraft TPC1 (幹部用輸送機 TPC1, Kanbu-yō Yusō-ki Tī Pī Shī Wan): A business jet-like VTOL used by TPC board members and leaders.
- Jupiter 3 (ジュピター3号, Jupitā San-gō): An exploration shuttle that was used to explore Jupiter, unfortunately the shuttle and its crew were assimilated into a monster called Ligatron.
  - Composite Monster Ligatron (複合怪獣 リガトロン, Fukugō Kaijū Rigatoron; 4): Originally a space organism, it assimilated with the Jupiter 3 spacecraft and its pilots, resulting in the birth of this monster. Ligatron journeyed to Earth and attacked the Space Development Department to consume its energy, using Dr. Ezaki's knowledge to hack into its security system. During its time on Earth, the assimilated passengers managed to briefly reunite with their families before being robbed of their free will again. While GUTS and Tiga fought against the monster, Shinjoh ordered Yazumi to transmit family photos of the passengers to Ligatron, allowing the assimilated passengers to fight back and release their spirit. Tiga managed to destroy the monster afterwards. Ligatron is voiced by Masaharu Satō.
- Orbiter (オービター, Ōbitā): A connecting shuttle from Earth to Space Station Delta.
- Medium tank (中型戦車, Chūgata Sensha): TPC's personal combat tanks, while capable of countering Enhanced Golza, their small armament made them vulnerable in against Jobarieh. This tank is still in use as of Ultraman Dyna, having participated in an attack against Giakuda, Geomos, Golza II and Deathfacer.
- GUTS Wing Blue Tornado (ガッツウイングブルートルネード, Gattsu Uingu Burū Torunēdo; GW-BT): A custom built GUTS Wing 1 designed by the American branch of the TPC. Although its speed availability exceeds GW-01 its weapons are less effective. This jet was first shown as a demonstration in episode 35 before making actual appearance in episode 51. A platoon of Blue Tornado fighters were deployed to pursue the Zoigers but each of them destroyed due to their inferior weaponry. Blue Tornado made its returning appearance in Ultraman Tiga and Ultraman Dyna, where a platoon of them were deployed by the Japan branch of TPC to fight against Deathfacer.
- GUTS Wing Crimson Dragon (ガッツウイングクリムゾンドラゴン, Gattsu Uingu Kurimuzon Doragon; GW-CD): A custom built GUTS Wing 1 designed by the European branch of the TPC. Its combat efficiency exceeds GW-01 and only appeared in episode 35 of the series as a demonstration. The jet made its proper debut episode 41 of the later series, Ultraman Dyna.
- Magnus 1 (マグナス1, Magunasu Wan) and Gravas 2 (グラバス2, Gurabasu Tsū): A pair of tanks that appeared in episode 36, they were armed with the anti magnetic force and anti magnetic wave respectively to counter the time-travelling monster Goldras. Unfortunately, said konster easily took care of the twin tanks.
- Romulus (ロムルス号, Romurusu-gō): A spacecraft made for the use of TPC Space Development Center. This jet was boarded by Shinjoh's colleagues and was attack by an intruding Illudo in episode 41.
- Garowa Flying Boat (ガロワ飛行艇, Garowa Hikō-tei): VTOL spacecraft deployed by the TPC Lunar Base Garowa, which is armed with four missile pods and is capable of travelling in both atmospheric and zero-gravity environments. In Ultraman Tiga, Hayate's version is colored white while Kishinaga's machine is colored orange. The jets are still operable as of Neo Frontier Era (Ultraman Dyna) and were among the fleets that fought against Gransphere in the Ganymede Base in Jupiter. In said era, the spacecraft were renamed as Cosmo Attacker (コスモアタッカー, Kosumo Atakkā).
- Ryugu (りゅうぐう, Ryūgū): Appeared in episode 50. A submarine used by the TPC to inspect the remains of ancient civilizations New Zealand but was destroyed by a Zoiger.

Ultraman Dyna Era

- TPC4WD: A standard jeep used by Ryo to search for Asuka in episode 2. It is also widely used by Military Police officers.
- TPC Glider (TPCグライダー, Tī Pī Shī Guraidā): A standard glider piloted by Kohda when GUTS machines were incapable of approaching Bazob due to its electromagnetic field disrupting their technologies. Its only appearance in episode 34 and during that time, it gives Dyna the opening to assimilate with GUTS Eagle's Tornado Thunder to destroy Bazob without endangering Kohda, Hibiki and a Helio base worker.
- TPC Armored Tanks (TPC装甲戦車, Tī Pī Shī Sōkō Sensha): A combat tank with enhanced armory, though its caliber being smaller than Medium Tanks. Its cannon was modified to be similar to that of the aforementioned tank in the fight against Golza II.
- Passion Red (パッションレッド, Passhon Reddo): Aircraft developed by South American branch of TPC, only shown in the fight against Dexador and Reigubas. Base model is Grumman F-14 Tomcat.
- Plasma Type 100 (プラズマ百式, Purazuma Hyakushiki): A test drive aircraft boarded by Kazuma Asuka in testing the Zero Drive flight navigation. He disappeared during the flight upon encountering a strange light. His son Asuka would conduct the same test his father had and discovered the empty jet itself upon succession. Following Asuka/Dyna's sacrifice by having captured in a black hole, Asuka in his GUTS Eagle Alpha Superior met his father in said jet and the two flies towards the light. Its name is a reference to the MSN-00100 Hyaku Shiki, a Mobile Suit from Mobile Suit Zeta Gundam.
- Remodeled Snow White (スノーホワイト改, Sunō Howaito Kai): A remodeled version of Maxima Overdrive test machine Snow White with silver plating in place of white. It was boarded by Masami Mishina before working as a ZERO instructor where he accompanied Kazuma in the Zero Drive test until he disappeared.
- Idol Robot Lovemos (偶像ロボット ラブモス, Gūzō Robotto Rabumosu; 32): An exploration robot under the codename "TM-39" which gained quite a huge popularity, with among its fans are Mai and Ryo of Super GUTS. Lovemos was sent to investigate an ancient civilization ruins in the Jupiter Moon Solbino. During the investigation, Lovemos turned rampant after hearing an ancient trumpet from said ruins. When returning to TPC Far East Headquarters Grandome, Lovemos quickly hijacked the tower's energy supply and assimilated with every available Ride Mechas into Satan Lovemos. After Mai purified Lovemos with the same trumpet, the robot regain it senses and return to its original form. Although willingly having itself killed to redeem its mistake, Dyna refused and left, sparing the robot. Soon after, Lovemos was sent to continue its exploration in Solbino. He is voiced by Yasuhiro Takato (高戸 靖広, Takato Yasuhiro).
  - Machine Monster Satan Lovemos (モンスターマシン サタンラブモス, Monsutā Mashin Satan Rabumosu; 32): After turning rampant, Lovemos assimilated with most of the Ride Mechas in Grandome's possession into a giant robot. Aside from armaments gained via its assimilated components, Satan Lovemos is capable of calculating its opponents' attacks to create a countermeasure against them. Having caught Dyna Miracle Type, Lovemos was about to impale the Ultraman's Color Timer with its drill until Mai replay the alien trumpet to bring the robot back to its senses.
- Space Power Station Helio (宇宙発電所へリオ, Uchū Hatsuden-sho Herio): A power station that functions by absorbing sunlights into special waves that charged its power to nearby stations. Its only appearance is episode 35 and at that time it was eaten by Bazob, leaving Hibiki and a maintenance worker in captive before Super GUTS and Dyna saved them.
- Gazelle (ガゼル号, Gazeru-gō): A spaceship which transported the Jupiter-born children in episode 41. The ship was once invaded by Diaorius' cocoons, forcing General Fukami with no choice but to issue Gazelle's destruction with its passengers until all of them were killed by Super GUTS and an adult Diaorius being killed by Dyna.
- Artificial Sun Tester NSP Cmapanella (人工太陽試験機 NSPカンパネラ, Jinkō Taiyō Shiken-ki Enu Esu Pī Kanpanera): A satellite which functions by capturing sunlight and radiate the neighbouring planets than Earth. It was briefly hijacked by Spume via Clarkov to melt the South Pole until Super GUTS managed to throw away the invader. Campanella was among those consumed by the Gransphere and was revealed to have transported to the world of Showa Universe where it clashed with the Planet Boris.
- MG-0005-RX Mountain Gulliver 5 (マウンテンガリバー5号, Maunten Garibā Go-gō; 42): A giant robot in Mars which was used to carry the Spacium Cannon (スペシウム砲, Supeshiumu-hō). This robot was piloted by Mai to take down Alien Reguran "General Zoaka" (レギュラン星人 ヅウォーカァ将軍, Regyuran Seijin Zuwōkā-shōgun) and his armies until it was revealed that the robot and the scenario itself was actually part of Asuka's dream. Its codename Mountain Gulliver is based on the rejected name for Ultraman Tiga and the word "MG5" is an in-joke to a Japanese cosmetic company that actor Jiro Dan (Hideki Gō from The Return of Ultraman) used to work.

== Other TPC-related organizations ==
=== ZERO ===
Training School ZERO (養成機関ZERO, Yōsei Kikan Zero) is a military training school for future cadets that will become members of TPC officers or Super GUTS members. The team made their appearance in Ultraman Dyna and chronologically first appeared in The Final Odyssey.

- Masami Mishina (ミシナ・マサミ, Mishina Masami): The current instructor in the series, who was a close friend of Kazuma Asuka, Shin Asuka's father. Kazuma's disappearances in the Zero Drive test greatly affected him and has a strained relationship with Asuka until the two reconciled when he let Asuka perform the drive test in hopes of stopping a comet from colliding with TPC Moon Base. He is portrayed by Edo Yamaguchi (エド山口).
- Takeru Fudo (フドウ・タケル, Fudō Takeru; 1, 2): Asuka's rival in the training school, as the two were known for having the same score in piloting. In the Super GUTS entrance exam, he was eliminated by Kohda but was shown participating in an attack against Sphire Synthetic Monster Gralen in episode 2. He died sometime later in an accident during a test drive and in episode 39, he was revealed to have a younger brother named Kenji Fudo.

Ride Mechas and Vehicles

- GUTS Wing Zero (ガッツウイングゼロ, Gattsu Uingu Zero): Repainted GUTS Wings used by ZERO rookie pilots, they made their appearance in The Final Odyssey. Four jets were piloted by future members of Super GUTS, Hibiki, Kohda, Ryo and Kariya in order to help GUTS members in against Shibito-Zoiger armies during their raid in R'lyeh. The platoon departed, leaving the rest of the battle to GUTS members.
- ZERO Training Machine (ZERO訓練機, Zero Kunren-ki): The standard GUTS Wing piloted by ZERO cadets. It is also because of the lack of computer system that this jet is convenient at certain times of need, as shown in episode 32 when it was used by Super GUTS after most of their existing Ride Mechas in storage being assimilated by Lovemos into Satan Lovemos.
- ZERO Instructor Machine (ZERO教官機, Zero Kyōkan-ki): White-colored GUTS Wing piloted by ZERO instructors, it can also be switched from exercise mode (for practice) to combat mode (real-life combat scenario). The jet is comparably superior than the Training Machine in performance specs.
- Multi Vehicle (マルチビークル, Maruchi Bīkuru): A multi-purpose vehicle operated by ZERO instructors.

=== Black Buster Squad ===
Black Buster Squad (ブラックバスター隊, Burakku Basutā-tāi) is a stealth unit in Ultraman Dyna that was founded by TPC staff Gondo under the TPC Military Police Branch. They were known for their navy blue uniforms and usage of GUTS Shadow, a modified GUTS Wing used for stealth missions. While appeared to be a dependable group, they were secretly corrupted and obeyed Gondo Kihachi's orders. Stationing themselves in TPC's Military Police Base Mars Lab (警務局火星研究所, Keimu-kyoku Kasei Kenkyūjo), they kidnapped Asuka and used him to create Terranoid, but when the artificial Ultraman was quickly hijacked, the group went defunct during his rampage before Dyna killed him.

- Reika Saeki (サエキ・レイカ, Saeki Reika; 49): The female captain of Black Buster. She was the sister of Saeki, whom engineered plan F in the first place. After Zeluganoid's attack and Asuka's disappearances, she guided Ryo to Daigo's place and gives the Super GUTS member her GUTS Shadow. Reika is portrayed by Kaori Mizushima (水島 かおり, Mizushima Kaori).
- Kenji Fudo (フドウ・ケンジ, Fudō Kenji; 39): The brother of Takeru Fudo, Asuka's rival who died in an engine trouble incident when he was a test pilot for the prototype of GUTS Eagle Alpha Superior. Kenji had a great hatred towards Asuka just like his late brother, but he gets over their differences when trying to stop Yamazaki. He survived during Zomborg's rampage with an injured right arm and quit the team while returned to the Training School ZERO where he resumed his training in order to achieve further membership in Super GUTS. Kenji is portrayed by Tomonori Yoshida (吉田 友紀, Yoshida Tomonori).

Mechas

- GUTS Shadow (ガッツシャドー, Gattsu Shadō): A modified GUTS Wing 1 made for Black Buster Squad's usage. The jet is fitted with magnetic beam and an energy beam launcher which is strong enough to destroy the monster. As its namesake suggests, it is also fitted with a camouflage system which can be distorted in hazy conditions. The jet made its debut on destroying Clone Daigelun and dispatched again to destroy Zeluganoid. When the group went defunct in episode 50, Reika gave her personal GUTS Shadow to Ryo for her to regroup with the Super GUTS.
- Terranoid: See above

=== Neo Super GUTS ===
Neo Super GUTS (ネオスーパーGUTS, Neo Sūpā Gatsu) is a successor to Super GUTS which appeared in Ultraman Tiga Gaiden. So far, much of its members remain unknown, as the only identified officer is Tsubasa Madoka, Daigo's son and their known mecha is GUTS Eagle Alpha Superior.

== Ultra Warriors ==
=== Ultra-Ancient Civilization ===
Unlike Showa Era Ultras, who were mostly from Nebula M78, Tiga's series mainly focuses on Ultra Warriors whose origin is from the Ultra-Ancient Civilization (超古代文明, Chō Kodai Bunmei) of 30 million years prior.

A long time ago, this civilization was known for being a utopia, until the arrival of dark forces, which came in the form of rampaging monsters appeared and spreads fear towards its civilians. Then the light appeared to the cities' people, bestowed its power to selected warriors to fight against the darkness and restoring peace. However, as more warriors were turned into giants of light, a power struggle arose which split them into two factions. Soon, a civil war started between these two factions and as a result, several combatants corrupted after embracing the darkness, therefore destroying the very same civilization they lived on. One after another, the ancient civilization started to fall.

One of the strongest Dark Giants was Tiga Dark, but he switched sides after falling in love with Yuzare and sealed himself and his own companions within R'lyeh. In aftermath of the battle, leftover giants who survived the civil war were left to protect the Earth but when humanity fell under the influence of Gijera, the giants were unable to do anything and left due to their inability to interfere with humanity's decision. This gave the great darkness a chance to appear and strike the ancient civilization. The ancient giants left behind their Ultra DNA and powers (stone statues) for future generations to use in hope of the same incident that befall their civilization would not happen again in the future.

In The Final Odyssey, the remains of fallen combatants in R'lyeh donated their light to resurrect the defeated Ultraman Tiga as Glitter Tiga, therefore placing an end to both Demonthor and the dark influences from their civilization.

=== Land of Tiga Pyramid ===
The Land of Tiga Pyramid (ティガの地のピラミッド, Tiga no Chi no Piramido) was an ancient golden pyramid which serves as a final resting place for Ultraman Tiga and his two other companions before they left behind their stone bodies and left the Earth. As revealed in Ultraman Tiga Gaiden, this pyramid was situated near the Sakimori Village (which was later renamed as the Land of Tiga (ティガの地, Tiga no Chi)), allowing Tiga's power to be utilized by Tsubasa and later Amui via a bronze Sparklence when the ancient sorcerer threaten the peace of their village. Said pyramid at that time was heavily disguised as a mountain while Jomonoid tried to destroy it. In the present day, (which took place in the first episode of Ultraman Tiga) Golza and Melba were awakened and contemplated to destroy the pyramid with the giants it houses. Guided by Yuzare's hologram in her capsule, GUTS located the pyramid but wasn't able to save it as both monsters destroyed it. When Daigo tried to defend the last statue from being destroyed, it was during that time he assimilated with it, bringing forth Ultraman Tiga to the modern era. The remains of destroyed statues were examined by Professor Yuji Tango, who in turn conspired with Keigo Masaki to search for another giant Ultraman statue in Kumamoto, leading to the birth of Evil Tiga.

As revealed in episode 49 of Ultraman Dyna, the remains of destroyed statues in the Tiga Pyramid was used by Gondo Kihachi to create his artificial Ultraman Terranoid.

In reality, Ultraman Tiga's first archetypal design was made in a form of a clay statue by Marbling Fine Arts company. Two other prototypes were also submitted by said company, and in the end one of them was chosen as Tiga's default design. The other two statues were however incorporated to the storyline as aforementioned stone bodies of Tiga's past allies that alongside him to protect the ancient civilization. Also, the original setting for the pyramid was instead supposedly to house five instead of three Ultras, with two statues being destroyed and the other two merging with Tiga to bestow him his Type Change abilities.

=== Evil Tiga ===
Evil Tiga (イーヴィルティガ, Īviru Tiga) is a white-colored ancient Ultraman that appeared in episode 44 of Ultraman Tiga. Originally a giant of light whose statue buried under the Cytech Building in Kumamoto, he was discovered and had his powers utilized by Keigo Masaki, who like Daigo, a descendant from the ancient giants of light, but desired to use the ancient warrior's power to lead the human race with his own hands, having dreamt of humanity's destruction as well. He assimilated with Evil Tiga's statue via Daigo's Sparklence and his converter, which turn him into light particles.

But instead of leading humanity, Masaki's forced assimilation caused him to lose control over the giant, leaving Evil Tiga to wreak havoc within Kumamoto and attacked the Ancient Ultra's original companion Guarde until Ultraman Tiga appeared. While both giants fought to a standstill, Tiga performed the Brain Chop attack, which was enough to cripple the corrupted giant for the hero to defeat it. Although Evil Tiga no longer appeared, Masaki's formula in harnessing the Ultra's power led to the foundation of Project F in TPC. Prior to Terranoid's appearance, Evil Tiga appeared in episode 46 as one of the past enemies whose image was used by Moravia while using its powers to project its target's fears.

Being an ancient Ultra Warrior, Evil Tiga bears similar body features to the titular hero despite being differently designed, such as the forehead gem Evil Crystal (イーヴィルクリスタル, Īviru Kurisutaru) and Evil Protector (イーヴィルプロテクター, Īviru Purotekutā) chest armor. His attacks are the energy blast Evil Beam (イーヴィルビーム, Īviru Bīmu), flying kick Evil Kick (イーヴィルキック, Īviru Kikku), and defensive shield Evil Barrier (イーヴィルバリアー, Īviru Bariā). His main finisher is the Evil Shot (イーヴィルショット, Īviru Shotto), which is done in a reversal way to Ultraman Tiga's Zeperion Ray.

Evil Tiga is voiced by Takashi Kora in the series, who is also the actor for Keigo Masaki. He is a playable character in the video game Ultraman Fighting Evolution 3, where he is voiced by Yūji Machi (真地 勇志, Machi Yūji), Ultraman Tiga's voice actor and the narrator of Ultraman Dyna. In an original concept, Evil Tiga was meant to appear in the 2016 movie, Ultraman X The Movie under suggestion of writer Takao Nakano but was turned down by Kiyotaka Taguchi after finding the plot too similar to the original Evil Tiga.

Evil Tiga's design was improvised from a rejected design of Ultraman Tiga and was never referred to his real name during his appearance, ironically being called by Rena as a Tiga Impostor (ティガの偽者, Tiga no Nisemono) despite his status as a genuine Ultraman. Evil Tiga's original proposal was meant to be a black-colored Ultraman, which was already made in conception by Hiroshi Maruyama since the first airing of Ultraman Neos (1995).

Although a genuine Ultraman, in the Ultra Series' 45th anniversary, Evil Tiga scored the fifth place in an Ultra Monster popularity ranking.

=== Ultraman Dyna ===
Ultraman Dyna (ウルトラマンダイナ, Urutoraman Daina) is the main titular Ultra Warrior of his own series, whose origin in the story remains unknown to this day. Dyna first appeared in the series as a mysterious light that bonded with Asuka after his GUTS Wing was destroyed, which left the man floating in space. When Super GUTS faced against Darambia on Mars, Asuka turned into a mysterious light and the Ultra Warrior made his debut on Mars, and killed Neo Darambia with relative ease. During that time, he was mistaken by a few people to be the long lost Ultraman, Tiga and was given an official name by Super GUTS' communication officer Mai (which revolves around the English word "dynamic") after other proposed names were rejected. Although bonded to Asuka, Dyna's entire activities were controlled by the man's own will, thus making him as the second case of "human Ultraman" (人間ウルトラマン, Ningen Urutoraman) after Tiga himself.

From that point on, Dyna continued to fight against monster and alien threats when they could not be handled by Super GUTS or other military factions alone. Because of his appearance, he is regarded by many (both in-series and fans alike) as the spiritual successor to Ultraman Tiga, having met the latter once while the Earth was in the brink of invasion by Alien Monera. During his brief meeting with Tiga, he also inherited Tiga's light, further cementing his title as Earth's next protector. During the series finale, when the Sphires' invasion reached its climax, his host Asuka was kidnapped and Dyna's power was forcefully used to bring forth TPC's artificial Ultraman Terranoid. When a weakened Dyna faced his mockery, it was then when his host's kidnapper Gondo reformed by sacrificing himself to give Dyna the energy needed to fight back. His relation to Asuka was first exposed to Gondo, Ryo and the Black Buster Squad before the rest of Super GUTS discovered it as well when he tried to save Ryo from Neo Gaigaraid. With the help of Super GUTS, Dyna was able to save the Earth from Gransphire but unfortunately both him and Asuka were sucked into the black hole created from said monster's explosion. Although seemingly killed, Dyna and Asuka in fact survived and the two continued to travel in-between universes, first meeting with Asuka's long lost father, Kazuma.

Dyna possess the Dyna Crystal (ダイナクリスタル, Daina Kurisutaru) that allows him to Triple Change (トリプルチェンジ, Toripuru Chenji), switching body colors and fighting prowess to his own preferences, based on Tiga's Type Change (タイプチェンジ, Taipu Chenji). In every accessed forms, he retains the common ability to erect Ultra Barrier (ウルトラバリア, Urutora Baria), an energy shield that defends him from incoming attacks. Unlike Tiga, Dyna's version is limited, as in each transformation he can only switch to one Type before switching back to the regular Flash Type (default form). However, his advantages is that he is capable of accessing his alternate forms right during his transformation, as he did so when fighting against Deathfacer and against Graikis. His three forms include:

- Flash Type (フラッシュタイプ, Furasshu Taipu): Dyna's default form, which bears the color red and blue and the Dyna Tector (ダイナテクター, Daina Tekutā) chest armor. Flash Type is based on the original Ultraman's fighting skills and is an analogous to Tiga's Multi Type, both are well-balanced in performances but unlike the latter, Dyna is mostly agile and dynamic, hence the origin of his name "Dyna". Apart from that, his Dyna Techtor allows him to manipulate light energies into various beam attacks, true to the form's namesake "flash". His main finisher is the Solgent Ray (ソルジェント光線, Sorujento Kōsen), which is performed in a similar manner to the original Ultraman's Spacium Ray but can also unleash a stronger variation, the Empowered Variant Solgent Ray (強化版ソルジェント光線, Kyōka-ban Sorujento Kōsen), by spreading his arms backward in a similar manner to Tiga's Zeperion Ray. Apart from that, he can also utilize real life-based skills such as Ultra Fork (ウルトラフォーク, Urutora Fōku), a forkball attack. In later appearances, he demonstrated other techniques, such as the healer-type Dyna Charging (ダイナチャージング, Daina Chājingu) in Ultraman Saga and Spiral Burst (スパイラルバースト, Supairaru Bāsuto) in Ultraman Orb: The Origin Saga.
- Miracle Type (ミラクルタイプ, Mirakuru Taipu): Dyna's blue-colored alternate form, based on Tiga Sky Type as both focuses on speed. Unlike Tiga, who proficiens in aerial combat, Dyna possess the ability to perform ESP-based attacks, such as Ultra Psychic (ウルトラサイキック, Urutora Saikikku) to utilize telekinesis or Nature Control (ネイチャーコントロール, Neichā Kontorōru) to manipulate natural elements to his liking. A variation of the latter is also utilized known as the Miracle Thunder Charge (ミラクルサンダーチャージ, Mirakuru Sandā Chāji), which helps him perform electrokinesis. He used it once to recharge his energy via Kokakuchu's plasma lightning. His main attack is Revolium Wave (レボリウムウェーブ, Reboriumu Wēbu), which can be performed in two variations: the Attack Version (アタックバージョン, Atakku Bājon) that banished his targets to a black hole or Reverse Version (リバースバージョン, Ribāsu Bājon) that reflect incoming attacks back to his opponents. Alongside Cosmos' Luna Mode, this form is the foundation of Ultraman Zero's Luna-Miracle Zero.
- Strong Type (ストロングタイプ, Sutorongu Taipu): Dyna's red-colored alternate form; its color scheme being inversion to Miracle Type, as the red color dominates the most than silver and is based on Tiga Power Type, as both focus on brute strength. Compared to Tiga who also utilized range attacks, Dyna only has a little of them, and most of his attacks are strength-related. His only ranged attack is Garnate Bomber Shooting Version (ガルネイトボンバー・シューティングバージョン, Garuneito Bonbā Shūtingu Bājon), which involves launching a spherical projectile towards the enemy or creating an Ultra Barrier to hold off the opponent's ranged attacks before launching it back to them. His known physical attacks are Vulcan Swing (バルカンスウィング, Barukan Suwingu), spinning his opponents in a high velocity or performing a Cross-Counter Punch (クロスカウンターパンチ, Kurosu Kauntā Panchi) to defeat his impostor, Imitation Ultraman Dyna. He also had an attack that was never shown in the series proper, called Garnate Bomber Swing Version (スウィングバージョン, Suwingu Bājon), slamming the opponent's head onto the ground. Alongside Cosmos' Corona Mode, this form is the foundation behind Ultraman Zero's Strong-Corona Zero.

Ultraman Dyna is voiced by Takeshi Tsuruno, the actor of his human host, Shin Asuka. In Ultraman Boy no Urukoro, he is voiced by Hiroshi Okamoto (岡本 寛志, Okamoto Hiroshi). In the Ultra Series' 45th anniversary, Dyna was placed 17th in the popularity poll and ranked 13th in 2013 with a total of 2301 voters.

=== Terranoid ===
Artificial Ultraman Terranoid (人造ウルトラマン テラノイド, Jinzō Urutoraman Teranoido) is a man-made Ultra Warrior that appeared in episode 49 of Ultraman Dyna.

Created by TPC in secret as part of the plan F, Terranoid used the remains two destroyed statues that laid to rest with Tiga and used Keigo Masaki's forced merger with Evil Tiga as a basis. Requiring an Ultra Warrior's energy to activate it, Gondo ordered the kidnapping of Asuka and used Dyna's energy as it went into the action by fending off Mars Base against an army of Sphires. However, Terranoid's energy quickly ran out due to his inability to conserve energy and was assimilated/hijacked by the Sphires into a horrid monster called Super Synthetic Beast Man Zeluganoid (超合成獣人 ゼルガノイド, Chō Gōsei Jūjin Zeruganoido). The creature rebelled against his own creators, forcing Asuka/Dyna to fight in a depleted energy until Gondo sacrificed his own life to replenish Dyna, allowing the giant of light to kill Zeluganoid with ease.

Terranoid's appearance is in fact based on Ultraman Dyna (particularly that of Strong-Type) with golden armor accessories. His main attacks are the Solgent Ray (Fake) (ソルジェント光線（フェイク）, Sorujento Kōsen (Feiku)) and Beam Slicer (Fake) (ビームスライサー（フェイク）, Bīmu Suraisā (Feiku)). As Zeluganoid, he retained his original attacks and is capable of utilizing energy shields and Flash Cycler (Fake) (フラッシュサイクラー（フェイク）, Furasshu Saikurā (Feiku)), the former which is also demonstrated in most Sphire-related synthetic monsters.

Terranoid/Zeluganoid's grunts were recycled from Dyna's original grunts, who in turn is voiced by Takeshi Tsuruno, Shin Asuka's actor.

== Antagonists ==
=== Ultra-Ancient Monsters ===
The Ultra-Ancient Monsters (超古代怪獣, Chō Kodai Kaijū) were the main monsters of Ultraman Tiga. As their title implies, their origin dated back to the era of ancient civilizations, having attacked same location before being driven away by the ancient giants of light. Their shared feature are porous skin on their neck, which in reality were used to disguise the peepholes for the suit actors.

- Ultra-Ancient Monster Golza (超古代怪獣 ゴルザ, Chō Kodai Kaijū Goruza; 1, The Final Odyssey): Called by Yuzare as the "earth shaker" (大地を揺るがす怪獣, Daichi o Yurugasu Kaijū), Golza was awakened within the grounds of Mongolia and join its partner Melba to attack the Tiga Pyramid and destroy Tiga and his companion's statues. Although being able to destroy the other two, once Golza was about to trample Tiga, the giant awakened after it assimilated with Daigo and fought both monsters. As the fight turned to Tiga's favor, Golza escaped and buried underground, leaving its partner Melba to be killed by Tiga. In The Final Odyssey, 5 Golzas appeared in the Ultra-Ancient civilization and terrorized it until they were countered by the ancient Ultra Warriors. Golza's main ability is Ultrasonic Ray (超音波光線, Chō Onpa Kōsen), which involves launching ultrasonic beam from its forehead. Golza is designed by Hiroshi Maruyama, with its face resemble that of Geronimon from Ultraman and original motif is based on Gomess from Ultra Q. Its original name was Orugo (オルゴ) before being changed to Golza.
  - Enhanced Golza (ゴルザ（強化）, Goruza (Kyōka); 18): Months after escaping from Ultraman Tiga, Golza buried itself into a volcanic area where it consumed the heat from its surroundings and evolved, gaining enhanced strength and firepower. Awakened by GUTS' attempt to stop said volcano from erupting, Golza went on a rampaging spree in its nearby area until Tiga appeared and killed it after a brief fight. Soon Tiga hurled Golza's corpse towards the volcano to prevent the eruption from happening. Despite named Enhanced Golza, later media of Ultra Series renamed it as "Fire Golza" (ファイヤーゴルザ, Faiyā Goruza).
  - Golza II (ゴルザII, Goruza Tsū; 43 (Dyna)): Nine years later in Ultraman Dyna, the original Enhanced Golza was revived and sported physical changes, such as a smaller head and its cells being able to absorb or sustain incoming attacks. This Golza fought against Dyna, the successor of its previous enemy, Tiga. While proven being able to outmatch Dyna, the Ultraman soon pierced through its skin and used that wound to attack, putting an end to Golza once and for all. Kariya speculated that Golza was revived with the help of Spheres, although no supportive evidence was shown.
- Ultra-Ancient Dragon Melba (超古代竜 メルバ, Chō Kodai Ryū Meruba; 1): Called by Yuzare as the "sky cleaver" (空を切り裂く怪獣, Sora o Kirisaku Kaijū), Melba was awakened from the mountains of Easter Island and join its partner Golza to attack the Tiga Pyramid and destroy Tiga and his companion's statues. Tiga statue was left but it quickly assimilated with Daigo and Melba was later on destroyed after Golza retreated and left its partner to deal with the giant. Melba's main attacks are Melbanic Ray (メルバニックレイ, Merubanikku Rei) and Slash Claws (スラッシュクロー, Surasshu Kurō). Melba is based on Litra from episode 1 of Ultra Q.
- Ultra-Ancient Monster Galra (超古代怪獣 ガルラ, Chō Kodai Kaijū Garura; 39): A monster whose skin is protected by the Counterattack Armor (カウンターアタックアーマー, Kauntā Atakku Āmā), which allowed it to resist against various attacks. Having survived its first encounter with Tiga, Galra went into hiding and rises once more in a rampaging spree on the city. An Esper named Makio Kirino challenged Daigo to destroy the monster with his own wit without using Tiga's power at the expense of his identity but seeing how Daigo gave up his challenge just to save Rena, a redeemed Makio informed Tiga of Galra's weakness, its unprotected neck where Tiga strike it quickly with Zeperion Ray, ending its life.
- Ultra-Ancient Plant Gijera (超古代植物 ギジェラ, Chō Kodai Shokubutsu Gijera; 45): A giant plant monster who partially responsible for the fall of ancient human civilization. When humanity choose Gijera, the Ultra Warriors were incapable of interfering with human decisions and laid to rest in their stone statues, all while said civilization was destroyed by the darkness. Although Horii stated that the Gijera is a new species, Nook (a survivor of the ancient civilization) revealed that Gijera is an Earth plant. Through the Gijera Extract (ギジェラエキス, Gijera Ekisu) pollen, humanity falls into the state of utopia until the sunset where Gijera ceased its activity due to being a plant. While Daigo learned that ancient giants were unable to interfere with humanity's decisions, he was forced to break the code after witnessing its effects on the civilians, having addicted to the pollen. Gijera's physical body was destroyed first before Tiga grabbed its root and destroyed the main core.
- Ultra-Ancient Apex Soldier Zoiger (超古代尖兵怪獣 ゾイガー, Chō Kodai Senpei Kaijū Zoigā; 50-52): Called by Yuzare as the "evil wings that burn off the ground" (地を焼き払う悪しき翼, Chi o Yakiharau Ashiki Tsubasa), these monsters are advance guards of Gatanothor, first awakened in New Zealand simultaneously with the surfacing of R'lyeh. One single Zoiger was faced by Rena in Snow White and soon killed by Ultraman Tiga. However, several more appeared, facing against worldwide branches of TPC. Following Gatanothor's death, all Zoigers disappeared as well. The Zoigers are based on Lloigor from the Cthulhu mythology.
  - Ultra-Ancient Vengeful Winged Ghost Shibito-Zoiger (Note: The name "Shibito" is a Heiban for "shinin" (死人; dead person).) (超古代怨霊翼獣 シビトゾイガー, Chō Kodai Onryō Yokujū Shibito Zoigā; The Final Odyssey): Smaller variants of Zoigers that inhabited R'lyeh. When the Dark Giants awaken, the Shibito-Zoigers tried to fly towards the human world but was blocked by Yuzare's light barrier until Tiga Dark's transformation freed them. Iruma managed to destroy their hive with TPC's leftover dynamite and most of the army vanished followed by Demonthor's destruction. Despite its size, the Shibito-Zoigers can launch an attack called Zoiger Bull (ゾイガバル, Zoiga Baru) and are capable of flying at the same speed as GUTS Wing 1 (Mach 5.5).

=== Kyriel ===
Infernal People Kyriel (炎魔人 キリエル人, Enma-jin Kirieru-bito; 3, 20, 25, 52 (Tiga)) were one of the villains of Ultraman Tiga and were the titular Ultra's first major adversary. A race of ancient demon from the past whose existence predated the ancient giants of light, they tried to rule humanity in the present day and saw Tiga as an obstacle. Their original plan was targeting Iruma of GUTS due to her acknowledging Tiga as humanity's savior and decided to kill any humans deemed not worthy to live. In their second appearance, they soon resort to brainwash an entire population into distrusting Tiga until Iruma broke them free from the Kyriel's influences. Eventually in the final episode, their race decided to leave for another dimension when Tiga was defeated by Gatanothor.

The Kyriel appeared as phantom states and is capable of utilizing ESP. They are also capable of possessing or disguise as a human. Two assumed human identities are Mitsuo Itahashi (イタハシ・ミツオ, Itahashi Mitsuo) and Keiko Ōnuma (オオヌマ・ケイコ, Ōnuma Keiko), both were actual individuals that died sometime prior to the series.

- Infernal Warrior Kyrieloid (炎魔戦士 キリエロイド, Enma Senshi Kirieroido; 3): The Kyriel's gigantic form, which utilized to fight Tiga. In this form, they were able to summon Hellfire Bullets (獄炎弾, Gokuen-dan) from beneath the ground. These fires are believed to be sacred within their believes. Following Tiga's appearance, a Kyriel grew into this form and fight the giant hero until Tiga froze him as Sky Type before utilizing Multi-Type and destroy it via Zeperion Ray.
- Infernal Warrior Kyrieloid II (炎魔戦士 キリエロイドII, Enma Senshi Kirieroido Tsū; 25): Having influenced the entire population into against Tiga, this Kyrieloid tried to guard the Gate of Hell (地獄の門, Jigoku no Mon). When fighting against Tiga Dark, he was able to adapt to Tiga's Type Change, growing Kyriel Cutters (キリエルカッター, Kirieru Kattā) on each arms when against Power Type and Kyriel Wings (キリエルウイング, Kirieru Uingu) when against Sky Type. Originally being able to overpower Tiga, when the town residents realized their mistake, they soon charge Tiga with their lights, giving the giant the strength to fight back. Throwing Kyrieloid II towards the Gate of Hell, Tiga launched his Zeperion Ray, simultaneously destroying both of them.

Mitsuo Itahashi and Keiko Ōnuma are portrayed by Hiroyuki Takano (高野 浩幸, Takano Hiroyuki) and Chihiro Haruna (春菜 千広, Haruna Chihiro) respectively. The Kyrieloids are voiced by Masaharu Satō (佐藤 正治, Satō Masaharu) and the first Ultra Monster to be designed in the series before Golza and Melba (both monsters in episode 1) would appear. Their main design motive is the devil.

=== Gatanothor ===
Evil God Gatanothor (邪神 ガタノゾーア, Jashin Gatanozōa; 51, 52) is the main antagonist of Ultraman Tiga. Called by Yuzare as "the great darkness" (大いなる闇, Ōinaru Yami), Gatanothor was responsible for the destruction of ancient civilization and had covered the Earth with great darkness before the monster and its followers went hibernated. In the present day, Gatanothor awakened several days after Gijera's destruction, bringing forth the sunken island R'lyeh to surface and unleashing its vanguard Zoigers. When Gatanothor's darkness began to spread all across the world, Tiga fought it but was quickly defeated due to its sturdy armor and gigantic body. Tiga was later turned into a stone statue before sinking into the depths of the sea. Eventually with everyone's lights around the world, Tiga was momentarily revived as Glitter Tiga and turn the tables to defeat Gatanothor, therefore restoring peace to Earth. Two years later in The Final Odyssey, Camearra used Gatanothor's own grudge to turn herself into a gigantic monster named Demonthor.

Gatanothor's main ability is to launch Shadow Mist (シャドウミスト, Shadō Misuto) to either spread darkness around the world or as hazardous gas used in attack. Aside from that, the monster bear tentacles and pincers hidden beneath the sea it inhabited. Its strongest attack is Petrifaction Ray (石化光線, Sekka Kōsen), (Note: Called in the Ultraman Fighting Evolution 3 as Penetration Laser (貫通レーザー, Kantsū Rēzā).) used to petrify Tiga back into a stone statue.

Gatanothor's main design is a nautilus and ammonite. Its head in an upside down position is a reference to Gatanothor's habit of looking down towards humanity.

=== Sphere ===
Space Orb Spheres (宇宙球体 スフィア, Uchū Kyūtai Sufia; 1, 2, 35, 44, 49-51) (Note: Spelt as Sphia in Ultraman Saga.) were the main antagonist of Ultraman Dyna. Their first appearance was during the Super GUTS training enrolment, attacking ZERO cadets and Asuka sacrificing his GUTS Wing to save Ryo. During its attack on TPC Mars base, it was then where Dyna made his debut and destroy several Spheres before fighting against Neo Darambia. While having fewer appearances in the series, they were soon given an active involvement in the three parter finale episodes, combining with each other to form Dark Planet Gransphere (暗黒惑星 グランスフィア, Ankoku Wakusei Guransufia) and contemplated to consume the whole Solar System. Having consumed Pluto and the artificial sun, Gransphire set its target on Earth, using a black hole as its shield until Super GUTS in Clarkov fires the Neo Maxima Cannon for Dyna to finish it. But Gransphire's death came at a high price, as Dyna/Asuka was absorbed into the black hole. In Ultraman Saga, it was revealed that several Spheres survived and tried to attack the TPC Mars base once more before being countered by Nozomu Taiga and being captured by Alien Bat to feed his Hyper Zetton.

Named by Saeko Shiina, Spheres are spherical alien life-forms with the ability to self-reproduction and assimilating with any life forms or organic substances. Upon combining into Gransphere, it was able to consume planets and shield itself with a large black hole. For attack purpose, the Gransphere can unleash mirages of past enemies which Dyna easily countered.

The Spheres are voiced by Ikuko Tatsu (達 依久子, Tatsu Ikuko).

=== Sphere Synthetic Monsters ===
Sphire Synthetic Monsters (スフィア合成獣, Sufia Gōsei-jū) were monsters in Ultraman Dyna, created by assimilating organic substances or other life forms. Their common ability revolves around energy beam and subspace barrier. Several of them can evolve into Super Synthetic Monsters (超合成獣, Chō Gōsei-jū), gaining enhanced powers and abilities.

- Synthetic Monster Darambia (合成獣 ダランビア, Gōsei-jū Daranbia; 1): A three-legged arthropod monster created after the Spheres assimilated with Mars minerals. Asuka attacked the in both aerial and ground combat before Dyna made his debut, using his rising sequence to simultaneously kill the monster.
  - Super Synthetic Monster Neo Darambia (超合成獣 ネオダランビア, Chō Gōsei-jū Neo Daranbia; 1, 2): Upon its destruction by Dyna's rise, Darambia's remains reconstituted into the bipedal Neo Darambia. Other than enhanced shielding, Neo Darambia also gained electric-based powers. It was able to resist most of Dyna's attacks until the Ultra launched his Solgent Ray, destroying its shield and simultaneously killing Neo Darambia for good.
  - Super Synthetic Monster Neo Darambia II (超合成獣 ネオダランビアII, Chō Gōsei-jū Neo Daranbia Tsū; 49): A second Neo Darambia created when the Spheres assimilated with the Mars minerals once more. This variation gains the additional ability to bulldoze its opponent with high speed. It was defeated with two Solgent Ray shots from Dyna but at this point, his relation to Asuka was exposed via a hidden camera, leading to the young man's capture and the creation of Terranoid. Neo Darambia II was modified from the original Neo Darambia, with the neck part of its suit remodeled to better fit the suit actor.
- Lava Synthetic Monster Gralen (溶岩合成獣 グラレーン, Yōgan Gōsei-jū Gurarēn; 2): While Super GUTS were busy fighting against Sphire armies on space, one of them went to Earth and assimilated with a nearby lava to form Gralen, making its way towards the defenseless Super GUTS base. Having destroyed a platoon of Spheres, Dyna raced towards the Earth and quickly stopped Gralen using Miracle Type's Ultra Psychic before using the Revolium Wave to destroy the monster with its own flame.
- Space Synthetic Monster Geomos (宇宙合成獣 ジオモス, Uchū Gōsei-jū Jiomosu; 35, 36): Originally a Sphere fragment from Pluto which took the form of a smile facial expression. When TPC and Super GUTS retrieve the fragment via Clarkov, the fragment assimilated with one of its Neo Maxima Engine, forcing them to eject it to Mount Rokkō, Osaka. Upon crashing, the smile fragment revealed its true form as a Sphere and assimilated with nearby rocks to become Geomos. This monster managed to resist both Super GUTS and Ultraman Dyna's attacks, even Miracle Type's Revolium Wave had countered. Dyna's defeat caused Asuka to be separated from his Lieflasher. While rampaging in the suburban area, a tracker was planted on Geomos before retreating underground. Said monster quickly evolved into Neo Geomos and used its original skin as a decoy to TPC, all while the original one attacking another side of Osaka.
  - Super Space Synthetic Monster Neo Geomos (超宇宙合成獣 ネオジオモス, Chō Uchū Gōsei-jū Neo Jiomosu; 36): Having fooled the TPC forces into attacking its original skin, Neo Geomos marched further to destroy the Cosmo Net. Neo Geomos' barrier grew stronger despite GUTS Eagle and GUTS Wing equipped with anti Maxima cannon. However, Munakata's arrival with the GUTS Wing EX-J which equipped with a further enhanced anti Maxima cannon turn the tables for both Ultraman and TPC officers to attack. Using Strong Type, Dyna threw Neo Geomos in mid-air for all forces to finish it at once.
- Blazing Synthetic Monster Graikis (灼熱合成獣 グライキス, Shakunetsu Gōsei-jū Guraikisu; 44): Created when a Sphere assimilated with Ice Venus, artificial bacteria developed by TPC as part of terraforming Venus. Instead of being destroyed, Dyna separated the Sphere fragment, allowing the monster to revert into the Ice Venus once more as it rained on the Venus surface in a similar manner to snow.
- Zeluganoid: See above
- Super Synthetic Monster Neo Gaigaraid (超合成獣 ネオガイガレード, Chō Gōsei-jū Neo Gaigarēdo; 50, 51): The final Synthetic Monster to appear in the series, Neo Gaigaraid was actually another breed of Gaigaraid that Dyna had killed in episode 29, which somehow ended up being assimilated with the Spheres. The monster appeared acted as the Gransphere's guardian and held Ryo in GUTS Shadow as a hostage. Dyna was able to save her before Super GUTS launched the Neo Maxima Cannon and destroyed said monster.

=== Alien Miji ===
Scheming Alien Alien Miji (知略宇宙人 ミジー星人, Chiryaku Uchūjin Mijī Seijin; 13, 30, OV) are the recurring alien antagonist in Ultraman Dyna. Their original plan was to conquer Earth with their machine Garaon. Their actions were spotted by Takeshi, a neighbouring kid but was able to cover things quickly before Super GUTS would arrive and investigate. Eventually, their plans were exposed when Asuka and Takeshi infiltrated their factory, forcing them to launch Garaon's head into the battle. Although seemingly banished in their Garaon by Ultraman Dyna's Revolium Wave, it was revealed that they managed to get out safely but soon adapted into the human society and later tricked a writer from their neighbouring apartment to write a script of Ultraman Dyna's destruction. The script's story materializes into an actual real life situation and likewise failed once more as their Garaon defeated by Dyna. In Ultraman Dyna: Return of Hanejiro, the Alien Miji was captured by Super GUTS, which simultaneously took place in Dyna's defeat by One-Z. To escape death penalty, they offered their alliance and used Pochi Garaon to do so by having Hanejiro deliver it to One-Z and freed Dyna, as well as killing Casa Madara, the android that manipulate the monster. But once discovering that One-Z is in their control, they used it to fight Dyna until Dolchenko broke the controllers, rendering it immobile for Dyna to dispose it via the Revolium Wave. Due to this, they soon ran away again from the authorities.

The Alien Miji's standard ability is to disguise themselves as humans. Unfortunately, the disguise can simply wear off with simple sneezes.

- Dolchenko (ドルチェンコ, Doruchenko): The Miji's main leader and tactician, he has the ability to deliver electric shock from his palms, using it to disciple his teammates. He is portrayed by Kinzō Sakura (桜 金造, Sakura Kinzō).
- Udochenko (ウドチェンコ): The second-in-command, he is portrayed by Shinichi Satō (佐藤 信一, Satō Shin'ichi).
- Kamachenko (カマチェンコ): An effeminate member, he is portrayed by Osamu Nakajima (中嶋 修武, Nakajima Osamu).

==== Garaon ====
Three-faced Robotic Monster Garaon (三面ロボ頭獣 ガラオン, Sanmen Robo Tō-jū Garaon; 13, 30) is the Alien Miji's invasion robot in Ultraman Dyna. Originally meant to be a giant robot whose height exceeded even the Tokyo Tower, Garaon's creation only went by its head after the Miji's plan were quickly exposed. The giant robot fought both Super GUTS and Dyna, managed to stun the giant hero with its laughing gas until the effect wears off and Dyna banished it via Revolium Wave. A second Garaon appeared via hologram made by the Miji's neighbouring writer when his script materializes into real life. This copy was nonetheless destroyed by Dyna.

Garaon's main feature is its three faces on the body, due to originally being the head of an actual robot. Each faces of different expression bears distinction attacks; the angry face bears its arm and the smile face launches laughing gas. In either faces, all of them can launch destructive energy means from their eyes.

- Special Mechanical Combat Monster Kogaraon (特殊戦闘用メカニックモンスター コガラオン, Tokushu Sentō-yō Mekanikku Monsutā Kogaraon; 30): A small/cheaper version of the original Garaon made from scraps, this was used by the Miji to relieve their depression from their last defeat. But upon activation, it was destroyed within 13 seconds.
- Micro Special Mechanical Combat Monster Pochi Garaon (特殊戦闘用超小型メカニックモンスター ぽちガラオン, Tokushu Sentō-yō Chō Kogata Mekanikku Monsutā Pochi Garaon; OV): A smaller version of the Garaon head they previously piloted. Initially meant for their latest invasion scheme, they used it to free Dyna in hopes of escaping Super GUTS' death penalty. Pochi Garaon was delivered into One-Z's head by Hanejiro and it destroyed the android controlling it, therefore rescuing Dyna but soon controlled the monster instead to fight the weakened Ultraman until the Miji accidentally broke their controller. Alongside One-Z, Pochi Garaon was banished by Dyna's Revolium Wave.

=== Alien Monera ===
Cosmic Plant Beastman Alien Monera (宇宙植物獣人 モネラ星人, Uchū Shokubutsu Jū-jin Monera Seijin) were the main antagonist of Ultraman Tiga and Ultraman Dyna. A race of space plants that gained sentience upon evolution, they desired to conquer Earth for their advanced technology. Through mind-controlling Professor Rui Kisaragi of TPC with their ESP, they orchestrated the creation of Prometheus and quickly hijack the battleship upon its second deployment. When Deathfacer was destroyed by Dyna, the aliens soon captured the Ultraman and combine with their spaceship to form Queen Monera.

- Specialized Seed Ship Monera Seed (専用種子船 モネラシード, Sen'yō Shushi-sen Monera Shīdo): The Alien Monera's main transportation, themed after a horseshoe crab. Its means of offensive abilities are Seeder (シーダー, Shīdā) energy beam and utilizing organic tentacles. The ship's main ability to convert any technologies into their liking, called Mollusion (モルージョン, Morūjon) which demonstrated in transforming the Prometheus battleship into Deathfacer.
- Titanic Plant Monster Queen Monera (超巨大植物獣 クイーンモネラ, Chō Kyodai Shokubutsu-jū Kuīn Monera): A giant monster which resulted when Alien Monera assimilated with their spaceship Monera Seed. Upon capturing Dyna, it imprisoned the Ultraman in its abdomen until he died from electric shock. However, Tiga's appearance managed to turn the tides of the battle, saving Dyna as the two teamed up to destroy the monster. Queen Monera's attacks are the Tentacle Bomb (テンタクルボム, Tentakuru Bomu), Crown Beam (クラウンビーム, Kuraun Bīmu), and QM Buster (QMバスター, Kyū Emu Basutā).

Monsters

- Cosmic Winged Skeleton Monster Geranda (宇宙有翼骨獣 ゲランダ, Uchū Yūyoku Kotsu-jū Geranda): A monster from Satellite Zealand (衛星ジーランド, Eisei Jīrando) of the Monera's home planet (as well as sharing the same DNA), Geranda was deployed by them to attack the Moon. As Geranda easily resist Dyna's attacks, this monster was quickly destroyed by the Prometeus battleship's Neo Maxima Cannon upon its introduction. Geranda's main attacks are the Zea Beam (ジービーム, Jī Bīmu), which launches fireballs from its mouth, and Mach Crash (マッハクラッシュ, Mahha Kurasshu).
- Cybernetic Demon Deathfacer (電脳魔神 デスフェイサー, Den'nō Majin Desufeisā): The Alien Monera's invasion robot. Originally TPC's battleship called Computerized Warship Prometheus (電脳巨艦 プロメテウス, Den'nō Kyokan Purometeusu), this warship was actually made by Professor Kisaragi through Alien Monera's mind-control in hopes of seizing an ultimate weapon. This ship contains the combat data of Ultraman Dyna due to his host Shin Asuka was tricked by Professor Kisaragi earlier into having his mind scanned by it. While facing the robot, Dyna/Asuka found themselves in a state of trauma due to experiencing a vision being decimated by the ship, causing Deathfacer to win in its first battle. The robot soon attacked the K3 district until Dyna Strong Type appeared and ripped off its limbs before delivering a huge punch on its chest. Dyna soon throw the robot off to the sky, therefore saving the city from its huge explosion. Deathfacer's main weapons are Death Scissor Ray (デスシザーレイ, Desu Shizā Rei) from its right hand pincher, Automated Gatling Gun (ガトリングガン連射, Gatoringu Gan Rensha) on its left hand and its strongest weapon, Neo Maxima Cannon (ネオマキシマ砲, Neo Makishima-hō) that can obliterate an island instantly. After the incident, the Neo Maxima Cannon was locked away by Professor Kisaragi due to being misused until she gave it to Super GUTS for their final battle against Gransphere. As Prometheus, the battleship's model was modified from MYDO's Sky Shark in Ultraman Zearth.

=== Giants of Darkness ===
The Giants of Darkness (闇の巨人, Yami no Kyojin) are Ultra Warriors from the Ultra Ancient Civilization that rose to prominence after a civil war between their own kind torn the civilization apart, causing several participants to fall into the dark side. Around that time, there were four dark giants: Camearra, Darramb, Hudra and Tiga Dark. Unfortunately for them, Tiga switched sides to the light side after hearing Yuzare's conviction and sealed his own companions. In the present day, two years after Tiga's final battle with Gatanothor, TPC discovered their stone statue and thought of using Keigo Masaki's own idea to manipulate the Ultra Warriors' powers for military strength but accidentally lifted their seal by mistake and eventually led them to their revival. Unable to escape because of Yuzare's light barrier, all three of them hunted and forced Daigo to join the darkness by giving him Tiga Dark's powers. Although he transformed into Tiga Dark and destroyed Yuzare's barrier, Daigo refused to join them and like the original Tiga, stole their powers and defeated them. Following their defeat, the dark influence disappeared and R'lyeh Island (which was the place they first sealed) sank. The Giants of Darkness are named after the characters of Cthulhu Mythos by H. P. Lovecraft.

- Love-Hate Warrior Camearra (愛憎戦士 カミーラ, Aizō Senshi Kamīra): The current leader of the dark giants and Tiga's lover in the past but said relationship turned into an unhealthy obsession due to Tiga's defection. After her revival in the modern times, Camearra used this opportunity to haunt Daigo in his visions and gave him the Black Sparklence for him to become Tiga Dark. When Daigo/Tiga refused join her in the dark giants and defeated Darramb and Hudra, Camearra was left to face him in her giant form. His action of rescuing his fiancé Rena further drove Camearra to the point of jealousy and forced her to transform into Demonthor before being defeated by Glitter Tiga. In her final moments, she redeemed from her past actions and died beside Daigo while finally gaining her own light. In her human form, Camearra displayed the ability to invade her target's dreams and visions, as well as the use of ESP and electrokinesis. Her dark Ultra form, which transformed from her own golden Sparklence appeared as a golden Ultra Warrior with feminine body archetype. Her main ability is utilizing ice whip from her right arm, called Camearra Whip (カミーラウィップ, Kamīra Wippu), which can also be used as an ice sword called Izword (アイゾード, Aizōdo). (Note: A pun of "Sword" (ソード, Sōdo) and "Aizō" (愛憎; Love and Hatred).) She is portrayed by Miyoko Yoshimoto (芳本 美代子, Yoshimoto Miyoko) and is based on Cthylla.
  - Dark Demonic Monster Demonthor (闇黒魔超獣 デモンゾーア, Ankoku Ma Chōjū Demonzōa): Camearra's monster form, which acquired after she assimilated with the restless spirit of Gatanothor. Through this form, she was able to kill Tiga until the deceased ancient giants of light revived him as Glitter Tiga, giving him the strength to defeat Demonthor from within via Zera Death Beam. Demonthor's main attack involves energy spear projections called Demon Jaber (デモンジャバー, Demon Jabā), which can be concentrated into a beam called Jab Rush (ジャブラッシュ, Jabu Rasshu). She also possess hidden tentacles called Demon Feeler (デモンフィーラー, Demon Fīrā), through which attempted to consume Glitter Tiga before he destroyed her from within.
- Herculean Warrior Darramb (剛力戦士 ダーラム, Gōriki Senshi Dāramu): A red dark giant whose fighting skills revolves around brute strength, which is also demonstrated in his human form. He was Tiga's close friend during his days as a dark giant, hence the English phrase "My Friend" and is the source of Tiga's Power Type. He is the first opponent to face Daigo when he refused to join their faction. He fought Tiga in an aquatic environment of R'lyeh, with the battle's favor turned to him due to his proficiency in underwater combat. Just as Darramb seemingly killed Tiga Dark, the giant absorbed his attack to partially restore his light as Tiga Tornado and used it to decimate his former friend with Deracium Beam Torrent. Darramb's main abilities are Darramb Whip (ダーラムホイップ, Dāramu Hoippu), lifting his opponents and continuously slamming them towards the ground and Darramatter (ダーラメッタ, Dārametta) continuous punch. Upon locking his opponent to the ground with Squitter (スクイッター, Sukuittā), he can perform his strongest attack called Fire Magnum (ファイアマグナム, Faia Magunamu), summoning a series of explosion from the underground. Darramb is portrayed by Masaru Matsuda (松田 優, Matsuda Masaru), previously portraying Team Hercules leader Satoru Yoshida from Ultraman Gaia and is based on Father Dagon.
- Agile Warrior Hudra (俊敏戦士 ヒュドラ, Shunbin Senshi Hyudora): A purple dark giant whose fighting skills revolves around aerial proficiency, while his human form displayed the ability of acceleration. Unlike his comrades, Hudra's relationship with Tiga Dark was rather strained due to the former's jealousy and is the foundation of Tiga's Sky Type. Following Darramb's defeat, Hudra brought Tiga Tornado to his asteroid belt-pocket dimension Illusion Space Lumagion (夢幻空間ルマージョン, Mugen Kūkan Rumājon), and is able to fight against the latter until Iruma triggered a detonator which destroyed both the Zoiger hives and expelled the two giants from the subspace. In the real world, Hudra tried to finish Tiga with his finisher but his actions backfired when Tiga converted the attack into his second partially light form, Tiga Blast and the former was killed with Runboldt Beam Shell. His main attack is the flying kick Janock (ジャノック, Janokku) and through the Drafork (ドラフォーク, Dorafōku) on his right arm, he is capable of launching energy bullets called Valtester (バルテスター, Barutesutā) or his finisher, the Hugust (ヒューガスト, Hyūgasuto). A stronger variation of the latter attack can be made by resting his left arm on the Drafork. He is portrayed by Tenmei Basara (婆裟羅 天明, Basara Tenmei), previously portrayed Alien Muzan in Ultraman Tiga and is based on Mother Hydra. In the 2014 game Super Hero Generation, he is voiced by Masahito Yabe (矢部 雅史, Yabe Masahito).

=== Dark Espers ===
The Dark Espers (暗黒超能力者, Ankoku Chō Nōryoku-sha) were main antagonists of Ultraman Tiga Gaiden. In the Jōmon period of Japan, they threatened the peace of Sakimori Village with his stone statue Degouf until Ultraman Tiga destroyed it. To obtain a monster, they summon Jomonoid from the present day to the Jōmon period, all while accidentally taken Tsubasa along for the ride. Their main target was to destroy the Tiga Pyramid in hopes of ensuring that Tiga or his companions would not rebel against his campaign. All members and their monsters were killed by the villagers of Tiga Village with the help of time-displaced Tsubasa.

Members

- Dogramagma (ドグラマグマ, Doguramaguma): The main leader and an ancient sorcerer (or rather, an Esper) with a wide knowledge in dark magic. He controlled Dogouf while fighting against Tiga, who was first used by Tsubasa before Amui utilize it to bring forth his full power. Dogramagma was killed as well when Tiga Power-Type used Deracium Beam Torrent. He is portrayed by Toshio Tomogane (友金 敏雄, Tomogane Toshio), who also portray Chief Ejiri from episode 25 and 26 of Ultraman Dyna.
- Daidara (ダイダラ): A Dark Esper with the ability to move at quick succession and levitation. He was given the command to control Jomonoid by Dogramagma to attack the Sakimori Village in hopes of luring out Ultraman Tiga. Following Tiga's disappearances, Daidara and Orotchi tried to fight against the villagers and was killed by Mahoroba via her sword. He is portrayed by Takashi Kora, the actor of Keigo Masaki/Evil Tiga from episodes 43, 44 and 52 of Ultraman Tiga.
- Orotchi (オロッチ): A Dark Esper with superhuman strength and wield a Kanabō, he made the attack on Sakimori Village and was killed by the Tigurū. He is portrayed by Koji Nakamura (中村 浩二, Nakamura Kōji), the suit actor of Heisei Ultras (Tiga, Dyna and Gaia), as well as the actor of XIG member Kuwabara from Ultraman Gaia.

Monsters

- Goggle-eyed Dogū Demon Degoufu (遮光器土偶魔神 デグーフ, Shakōki Dogū Majin Degūfu): (Note: Credited as Dark God (闇の魔神, Yami no Majin).) The first of the Dark Espers' monster, a sentient Dogū statue which had once attacked the Sakimori Village until Tiga appeared and defeated the monster before disappearing.
- Space-time Flying Monster Jomonoid (時空飛来怪獣 ジョーモノイド, Jikū Hirai Kaijū Jōmonoido): A monster that Tsubasa encountered during his training until the two were brought back in time to the Jōmon period. The monster was manipulated by the Dark Espers to attack Sakimori Village until Tiga appeared and briefly fought it before throwing it in mid-air due to his energy running out. Jomonoid was later commanded to destroy the Tiga Pyramid and faced the giant again with Dogoufu. It was killed by Tiga via Zeperion Ray.
- Goggle-eyed Dogū Demon Dogoufu (遮光器土偶魔神 ドグーフ, Shakōki Dogū Majin Dogūfu): A giant Dogū that was awakened by Dogramagma to destroy Tiga Pyramid. After easily defeating the first Tiga (Tsubasa), it was met with Amui, who managed to draw Tiga's full power. With the help of Mahoroba, Tiga Power Type destroy both Dogouf and Dogramagma with Deracium Beam Torrent.

=== Casa Madara ===
Evil Android Casa Madara (凶悪アンドロイド カーサ・マダラー, Kyōaku Andoroido Kāsa Madarā) (Note: Only credited as Alien Dehadoh's Android (デハドー星人のアンドロイド, Dehadō Seijin no Andoroido), her real name was shown in "Tsuburaya All Monsters Photobook".) is the primary antagonist of Ultraman Dyna: Return of Hanejiro. Armed with the ability to manipulate time flows and superhuman capabilities, Casa was sent by her masters, Alien Dehadoh as vanguard to invade the Earth by first eliminating Ultraman Dyna. She is referred as the main component of the Alien Dehadoh's ultimate weapon, One-Z. Having witnessed the Ultraman's capabilities, she challenged Asuka/Dyna again, controlling One-Z and managed to petrify him into a stone but was killed when Alien Miji sent their Pochi Garaon to ram within One-Z's main body, therefore rescuing Dyna.

She is portrayed by Asami Sawaki (沢木 麻美, Sawaki Asami).

=== Arwon ===
Absorption Monster Arwon (吸収怪獣 アーウォン, Kyūshū Kaijū Āwon) is Alien Dehadoh's monster weapon under control by Casa Madara. Summoned through her own switch, Arwon first appeared in the city and fought both Super GUTS and Dyna, demonstrating the ability to absorb incoming attacks before leaving. It was summoned again with the Power Rock (パワーロック, Pawā Rokku) stone from Planet Dehadoh, with Casa combined herself, Arwon and the Power Rock into the Combined Invasion Weapon Beast One-Z (合体侵略兵器獣 ワンゼット, Gattai Shinryaku Heiki-jū Wanzetto). In this form, One-Z was able to defeat Ultraman Dyna and had him imprisoned within a stone. While Super GUTS managed to save Dyna with the help of Alien Miji's Garaon, they soon manipulate One-Z into attacking Dyna after finding themselves in control of it, due to Casa's destruction. But because of a quick loss of control, Dyna banished it via the Revolium Wave, leaving the Miji on a loose again and therefore foiling the Dehadoh's invasion on Earth.

Arwon's regular ability is to absorb incoming attacks. As One-Z, the monster possess enormous strength and agility, as well as capable of shielding itself from Dyna Miracle Type's Revolium Wave. Its main attack is an energy beam, which can only be triggered if Casa was in charge of One-Z. However, One-Z's true nature is nothing more than a living homunculus and can only be moved when any smaller beings controlled its actions from within its head.

== Minor characters ==
=== Minor characters in Ultraman Tiga ===
- Yuzare (ユザレ; 1, 2, 20, 45, 50): The commander of the Terran Defense Team (地球星警備団, Chikyū-sei Keibi-dan) in 30,000,000 years in the past. Her capsule was retrieved by GUTS, which contained her AI hologram about the coming of a monster era, which can only be countered by the awakening of Ultraman Tiga. Her hologram was heard by many members of GUTS in secret, conveying her message to Daigo as the descendant of the ancient civilizations. She was the first to reveal the giant's name as Tiga, which Daigo would convey to his teammates. She was revealed to be the ancestor/previous incarnation of Iruma, as her AI briefly morphed into her younger self, which appeared to be identical to the latter when warning them about Zoiger's attack and Gatanothor's reawakening. The Final Odyssey further cemented this when she appeared from Iruma's body to seal off the Shibito-Zoigers but her barrier would only work for 100 years and that Daigo must solve the issue quickly. She is portrayed by Minako Osanai (長内 美那子, Osanai Minako) while her younger self is portrayed by Mio Takaki, Iruma's actress.
- Takehiko Onoda (オノダ・タケヒコ, Onoda Takehiko; 5, 33): Munakata's old friend, a journalist who originally distrust GUTS operation method until the Sealizar incident changed his mind. He had a junior journalist who disappeared five years prior to the series, only to be revealed as a member of Kyuranos' vampire cult. He managed to bring his junior back to her senses, only for her to commit suicide. Alongside Munakata, the two weaken Kyuranos for Tiga to defeat him, therefore avenging Takehiko's late junior. He is portrayed by Akira Ohtani (大谷 朗, Ōtani Akira).
- Ryosuke Sanada (サナダ・リョウスケ, Sanada Ryōsuke; 11, 47): A researcher in the Stellar Development Department who is also an old colleague of Horii and Sayaka. Being the child of scientists, Ryosuke has a perfectionism complex and tried to prove the efficiency of the Evolu cells by infecting himself with it but aside from enhancing his body performance, this also mutated him into a monster that craved for electricity. While rampaging as Evolu, Tiga tricked him into wasting his supplies of electricity, allowing him to peacefully die as a human. Sometime later when Metamorga appeared and endangered his colleague's lives, Ryosuke's ghost as an Evolu dragged save them. He is portrayed by Shun Yuzuhara (柚原 旬, Yuzuhara Shun).
  - Variant Evolution Monster Evolu (異形進化怪獣 エボリュウ, Igyō Shinka Kaijū Eboryū; 11, 47): Ryosuke's monster form, resulted when he came in contact with the Evolu Cells (エボリュウ細胞, Eboryū Saibō), substance from an alien meteorite which capable of enhancing an organism's performance but also caused them to crave for electricity. Ryosuke rose as Evolu multiple times during the night to feed on electrical charges. In one of Evolu's attacks, Horii launched the Monster Catcher tracker to properly track him, leading to Ryosuke and the exposure of his secret. When Ryosuke transformed into Evolu again, Tiga appeared and simply tricked it into wasting its supplies, allowing Ryosuke to die as a human. In episode 47, Ryosuke's spirit transformed into a ghost version of Evolu called Phantom Evolu (幻影エボリュウ, Gen'ei Eboryū) to rescue his old colleague Horii and Sayaka from Metamorga for Tiga to finish the monster quickly.
- Sayaka Ijuin (イジュウイン・サヤカ, Ijūin Sayaka; 11, 47): A colleague of Horii and Ryosuke, as well as the latter's target of affection. She was the first to notice Ryosuke's change of behavior and discovered it too late when he transformed into Evolu. In episode 47, when she, Horii and Michiru were about to be attacked by Metamorga, they were rescued by Ryosuke, whose spirit took on the appearance of Phantom Evolu. She is portrayed by Michiko Shimazaki (島崎 路子, Shimazaki Michiko).
- Shinichi (シンイチ, Shin'ichi; 13): Shinjoh's cousin and a third year elementary school student who aspired to become a member of GUTS. He was kidnapped by Alien Raybeak while trying to track them until he was rescued by Ultraman Tiga. From that day onwards, he worked as a patroller in his hometown. He is portrayed by Hirokazu Tachikawa (立川 大和, Tachikawa Hirokazu).
- Takuma Aoki (アオキ・タクマ, Aoki Takuma; 15 (Tiga), 19 (Dyna)): Mayumi's boyfriend and a motorcycle road racer who lost his life after Gazort II's attack. His final appearance to Mayumi was as a ghost before departing to afterlife. He reappeared again in episode 19 of Ultraman Dyna, assisting the titular Ultra Warrior in distracting Kokakuchu and rescued his younger brother Haruchika. He is portrayed by the real life motorcycle racer Takuma Aoki (青木 拓磨, Aoki Takuma), who ironically had his career ended in 1998 after a motorcycle accident caused his waist paralysed.
- Kagetatsu Kojuro Nishikida (錦田 小十郎 景竜, Nishikida Kojūrō Kagetatsu; 16): An ancient swordsman that was born with the supernatural ability, he put use to his powers to slay monsters that threaten the peace of Japan. In one of his travels, he slayed the giant demon Sakunaoni, sealing its pieces in a mountain with his sword and was laid to rest. In the present day, when three robbers stole the sword from his shrine, he possessed one of them and tried to return it but was too late. It was then where he met Daigo and requested his help, sensing the youth not to be a normal human. While Daigo/Tiga fought Sakunaoni, he managed to decapitate the demon but its head quickly bit Tiga until Kagetatsu threw his sword, putting an end to the demon's wrath. He leaves for afterlife and passed the baton of Earth's protector to Daigo, a message that relayed by the possessed robber during his arrest. He is portrayed by Hiroshi Kawasaki (川崎 博司, Kawasaki Hiroshi).
- Michiru Ezaki (エザキ・ミチル, Ezaki Michiru; 22, 47 (Tiga) 35, 36 (Dyna)): The daughter of late Dr. Ezaki, who boarded the Jupiter 3 spacecraft, she was first shown during the Magnia incident and was saved by Horii when a nearby population was enslaved. This eventually sparked a beginning of their relationship which eventually led to their marriage in episode 47. Nine years later in Ultraman Dyna, Michiru took up Horii's family name and had two children from their marriage. She is portrayed by Misato Hayase (早勢 美里, Hayase Misato).
- Tomoki Miura (ミウラ・トモキ, Miura Tomoki; 25, 52): Iruma's son, who lives with her mother in law after his father died. He is a computer genius whose skill also exceeded that of GUTS communication officer Yazumi but his relationship with Iruma is rather strained. He was the only one who maintain his trust for Tiga even after his hometown's population being brainwashed into distrusting the giant. He also used his hacking ability to provide Tiga with light in hopes of defeating the mastermind Kyrieloid II. He was last shown as one of the few children to donate their lights and revive Tiga as Glitter Tiga when facing Gatanothor. He is portrayed by Kazuki Tsuji (辻 和希, Tsuji Kazuki).
- Masachika Nezu (根津 正親(ネヅ・マサチカ), Nezu Masachika; 32): A scientist who studied the Zelda gas, he lost his daughter Asami in an accident involving the gas. In the present day, he became as outcast and was struck by an incurable disease. He noticed that his daughter's parrot Shilakiit mutated into a giant monster and tried to avenge Asami by disposing the gas. Nezu soon helped the bird by bringing out the gas while Shilakiit absorbed it and passed away. He died afterwards and his soul combined with Shilakiit's corpse into a golden spiritual bird which brought them and his late daughter Asami away from Earth. He is portrayed by Minori Terada (寺田 農, Terada Minori).
- Asami (アサミ; 32): Shilakiit's owner and Nezu's daughter, who died in an accident involving the Zelda gas from 20 years prior. In the present day, her spirit rode Shilakiit when the two and her father decided to leave Earth. She is portrayed by Yuka Koide (小出 由華, Koide Yuka).
- Yukina Hazuki (ハヅキ・ユキナ, Hazuki Yukina; 33): A reporter and Takehiko's junior, who went disappeared five years prior to the series while investigating a strange disease outbreak in South America. In truth, she was actually transformed into a vampire by Kyuranos as part of the Tribe of Graceful Nights. While GUTS storm the cult's hideout, she was left to fend for herself when her teammates defeated until Takehiko appeared and embraced her, believing that she still have her remaining humanity. This managed to bring Yukina's original self out for a moment and committed suicide by exposing herself to the sunlight. Her death was avenged by Takehiko when he attacked Kyuranos' eyes, allowing Tiga to finish him. She is portrayed by Motoko Nagino (梛野 素子, Nagino Motoko).
- Yuri Tezuka (テヅカ・ユリ, Tezuka Yuri; 36): A 17-year-old high school girl from year 1932 who was brought to the modern era by the Space Time Monster Goldras. With no guidance over the modern era, she was guided by Yazumi on a tour across the city. She was returned to her proper time after Yazumi destroyed Goldras' horns but was revealed to have been growing up as an old woman that Yazumi met in his childhood. She is portrayed by Sayaka Kamiya (神谷 涼, Kamiya Sayaka) as a teenager and Machiko Naka (中 真千子, Naka Machiko) as an elder woman.
- Makio Kirino (キリノ・マキオ, Kirino Makio; 39, 52): A man with ESP who is able to predict future events and communicate with others through telepathy. Thanks to this ability, he knew Daigo's identity as Ultraman Tiga. He became jealous of Daigo, because Daigo/Ultraman Tiga was praised as a hero with his "extraordinary power", while Makio himself was seen by others as a monster. Makio then blackmailed Daigo to play games with him and told him to defeat the monster Galra without transforming, and even threatened to reveal Daigo's identity as Ultraman Tiga to the world if he lost or transformed against the rules. But after seeing Daigo's eagerness to protect Rena, he is touched and redeemed himself by telling Daigo Galra's weak spot, so he could finally defeat it. During the final episodes, he contacted GUTS through his telepathy after means of communication were jammed by the darkness. He is portrayed by Naoki Miyashita (宮下 直紀, Miyashita Naoki) and Mao Tsutsui (筒井 万央, Tsutsui Mao) as a child.
- Keigo Masaki (マサキ・ケイゴ, Masaki Keigo; 43, 44, 52): A renowned young genius whose excellent in mathematics and physics, as well as the CEO of Cytech Corporation (サイテックコーポレーション, Saitekku Kōporēshon) in Kumamoto. Like Daigo, he is a descendant of the ancient civilization and had also received a dream of humanity's destruction but felt that an Ultraman's duty is to lead humanity, something which Daigo disagreed due to his intentions were only to fuel his own ego. It was revealed that he conspired with Professor Yuji Tango of TPC to mass-produce the ancient Ultraman. By stealing the Sparklence from Daigo, he used it with his converter to assimilate with the statue of Evil Tiga but due to the impurities of his heart, he lost control of the giant and rampaged across Kumamoto until Ultraman Tiga killed him. He was captured by the authority afterwards but in the finale, he agreed to assist TPC in reviving Tiga using the Maxima Converter Unit (マキシマ・コンバーターユニット, Makishima Konbātā Yunitto) but failed when Gatanothor interfered. While Tiga was instead revived with the worldwide children's lights, Masaki was safely recovered and was given commendation for his participation, therefore redeeming him from his previous acts. He is portrayed by Takashi Koura (高良 隆志, Kōra Takashi).
- Nook (ヌーク, Nūku; 45): A member of the ancient civilization whose body was converted into a cyborg alongside his daughter to survive from their civilization's destruction. Nook and Terra travelled through various planets and returned to Earth during Gijera's reawakening, briefly meeting one of their kind's descendants and watched him fighting against Gijera, a contradiction of an Ultra's policy not to interfere with human decisions. Although Nook and Terra can no longer survive due to their need of Gijera pollen, they nonetheless thanked Tiga for finally eliminating the plant. He is portrayed by Minori Sawatari (佐渡 稔, Sawatari Minoru).
- Terra (テラ, Tera; 45): Nook's daughter, who like her father also a member of the ancient civilization and had been remodeled into a cyborg to survive, feeding on Gijera pollens. The cybernetic also had stopped her growth development, remaining as a child from 30,000,000 years prior. She is portrayed by Rika Kanetsuna (金綱 理香, Kanetsuna Rika).
- Eiji Tsuburaya (円谷 英二, Tsuburaya Eiji; 49): Founder of the Tsuburaya Productions, in the past, he met the alien warrior Ultraman and was given the Star of Ultra (ウルトラの星, Urutora no Hoshi) should the monster he sealed, Yanakargie rises again. Time passes and in 1966 Daigo's time travel to track down Charija but was too late as the alien released Yanakargie from its seal and while Tiga struggled with it, Tsuburaya summoned the original Ultraman to help Tiga taking down the monster. From this point onward gives him the inspiration to create the famous 1966 tokusatsu series, Ultraman. He is portrayed by Yūsuke Takita (滝田 裕介, Takita Yūsuke).

=== Minor characters in Ultraman Dyna ===
- President Tachibana (タチバナ社長, Tachibana-shachō; 4): President of the Geofront (ジオフロント, Jiofuronto), he wished to create a new underground city in contrast to TPC's outer space exploration campaign. His drilling method used PW wave, which would awaken a monster called Daigelun from its slumber. Although Super GUTS tried to stop him, his eagerness to have his dream come true awakened the monster itself. After Daigelun's defeat, Tachibana vowed to restart his project based on ants, which was actually the inspiration for his dreams. He is portrayed by Kenji Mitamura (三田村 賢二, Mitamura Kenji).
- Yūsaku Himuro (ヒムロ・ユウサク, Himuro Yūsaku; 5): A famous pitcher of the New York Nights from United States Major League Baseball and is Asuka's colleague in high school. As a child, he was considered a prodigy for his pitching ability but this talent diminished in his last match, giving the rival team a chance to win. Due to this, he initially wanted to retire from his career until Asuka managed to convince him otherwise. Yūsaku as well is the founder of Dyna's Ultra Fork forkball attack, as the Ultra used it to destroy Daigelun in one swoop after most of his attacks were blocked by the monster's large pincers. He is portrayed by Kazuya Matsushita (松下 一矢, Matsushita Kazuya).
- Yuka Yoshimura (吉村 由香(ヨシムラ・ユカ), Yoshimura Yuka; 7): A girl who loses her friends and family in a monster attack that destroyed her apartment. She befriended a Gyabish and helped it running away from both TPC/Super GUTS and Alien Dais before Gyabish revealed its true nature and devoured her. She was rescued by Alien Dais when he sacrificed his life, as Yuka's appearance is identical to his late daughter. She is portrayed by Miku Yamashita (山下 未来, Yamashita Miku).
- Mustafa Ali (ムスタファ・アリ, Musutafa Ari; 8): A scholar from Alaska that encountered Bao-on. He is portrayed by Majid Shayesteh.
- Dr. Akizuki (アキヅキ博士, Akizuki-hakase; 10): Kariya's former teacher and a geoglyphs researcher. He accidentally awakened the Zenekindarl people before Kariya and Ryo freed him and his family. He is portrayed by Daisuke Odera (小寺 大介, Odera Daisuke).
- Takeshi Endō (遠藤 武, Endō Takeshi; 13): A local boy who manages to catch the Alien Miji's schemes, unfortunately the aliens managed to cover up their true acts due to Takeshi's nature as a liar in the neighbourhood area. He blackmailed Asuka into following him due to the latter stole one of his manga and managed to prove his innocence, foiling the Mijir's plans in building Garaon, leaving it as a head. After the battle, he seemingly manages to speak the truth but lied to his mother that he became an Ultraman to finish the aliens, much to Asuka's dismay. He is portrayed by Taizō Shibuya (渋谷 泰蔵, Shibuya Taizō).
- Dr. Otomo (オオトモ博士, Ōtomo-hakase; 16): A researcher from TPC's Biological Technology Institute (生物工学研究所, Seibutsu Kōgaku Kenkyūjo) who went rogue after his plans to use the monsters as part of TPC's assets were rejected. This leads him and Yamazaki going rogue to experiment upon clone monsters, picking up past defeated monsters' remains and creating enhanced clones of themselves. He also acquired an unknown monster and combine it with several DNA genetics he collected to create Neosaurus. Requiring a developed brain, he kidnapped Hanejiro and used it to complete Neosaurus. Super GUTS investigated his disappearances and discovered him in his island, but Neosaurus went beyond his control and trampled on him. He is portrayed by Akira Miyazawa (宮沢 彰, Miyazawa Akira).
- Researcher Hiroyuki Yamazaki (ヤマザキ・ヒロユキ研究員, Yamazaki Hiroyuki-kenkyū-in; 16, 39): Dr. Otomo's assistant, who joined him in his defection from TPC. Having escaped during Neosaurus' rampage, Yamazaki tried to continue Otomo's research by using the enhanced Evolu cells that was confined within Grandome. Using Clone Daigelun as a diversion, he stole the Evolu cells and planned to spray it on the Earth with a special warhead fired from his lab in outer space. His base was stormed by Asuka and Black Buster member Kenji, and after a brief gunfight, he launched the rocket while injecting himself with the Evolu cells to become Zomborg. He is portrayed by Yūji Watari (渡 祐志, Watari Yūji).
  - Super Variant Evolution Monster Zomborg (超異形進化怪獣 ゾンボーグ, Chō Igyō Shinka Kaijū Zonbōgu; 39): In hopes of killing Asuka while ensuring that his missile would hit the Earth and transform humanity into monsters, Yamazaki self-injected the remaining Evolu cells and turn into Zomborg. Dyna fought against him and killed the mad scientist with the Solgent Beam before banishing his missile with the Revolium Wave. In an original plan, Zomborg was meant to be another rogue TPC worker before writer Keiichi Hasegawa changed it to feature Yamazaki's return.
- Erika Honjō (ホンジョウ・エリカ, Honjō Erika), Yūki Hirokawa (ヒロカワ・ユウキ, Hirokawa Yūki), Mizuki Kuno (クノ・ミズキ, Kuno Mizuki), and Saya Nagase (ナガセ・サヤ, Nagase Saya) (18): Four students of Seinan Girls School (聖南女子学園, Seinan Joshi Gakuen) who were manipulated by Bishmel to use black magic and eliminate targets that they had begrudging on. During Super GUTS intervention due to strange disappearances caused by them, they tried to use Bishmel's powers against them until Asuka fired on the monster. When Bishmel rises, Dyna wasn't able to defeat the monster due to the victim it contained until the four students redeemed from their acts and destroyed the magic circle they used, forcing Bishmel to release all of its victims. After the incident, all four of them continued their normal lives as students. They are portrayed by Rie Imamura (今村 理恵, Imamura Rie), Tsugumi (つぐみ), Emi Shigemitsu (重光 絵美, Shigemitsu Emi), and Shiori Taguchi (田口 しおり, Taguchi Shiori) respectively.
- Haruchika Aoki (アオキ・ハルチカ, Aoki Haruchika; 19): Takuma's younger brother. Aoki's dream as a motorcycle racer is made in honoring his brother's death. When Kokakuchu tried to attack him, Takuma's spirit saved him. He is portrayed by the similarly named former Grand Prix motorcycle road racer, who is also Takuma Aoki's real life younger brother.
- Tatsuo (辰雄) and Minoru (実) (20): Satoru (Alien Lasesta)'s friends, who kept his true identity as a secret and helped the boy getting pass through Super GUTS. As they watched Dyna helping Satoru leaving Earth, they swore themselves to catch up with their friend in the future with Tatsuo wanting to become an astronaut while Minoru becomes a scientist to build a spacecraft. They are portrayed by Toshiyuki Toyonaga (豊永 利行, Toyonaga Toshiyuki) and Takaho Yamada (山田 孝穂, Yamada Takaho) respectively.
- Dr. Touko Ayano (綾野 塔子博士, Ayano Tōko-hakase; 22): Ryo's senior in her college years, she was attacked by Mozui after accidentally lifting the monster's seal but managed to give Super GUTS the deciphered words from that remains. She recovered from the attack and had Mai gave Ryo a caricature of a crab. She is portrayed by Hairi Katagiri (片桐 はいり, Katagiri Hairi).
- Natsumi Kudo (クドウ・ナツミ, Kudō Natsumi; 31): An aspiring photographer who blackmailed Asuka into giving her a ride. She was able to identify the Imit-Dyna that Gregore imposed as a fake and supported the real Dyna when the imitator challenged him into a deathmatch. She is portrayed by Mayuka Fujiwara (藤原 まゆか, Fujiwara Mayuka).
- Sonoka Hibiki (ヒビキ・ソノカ, Hibiki Sonoka; 33): Hibiki's daughter, who had an estranged relationship with her father and joined a group of delinquents called Roller Kids (ローラーキッズ, Rōrā Kizzu). She is portrayed by Ayumi Yamaguchi (山口 あゆみ, Yamaguchi Ayumi).
- Tsugumu Horii (ホリイ・ツグム, Horii Tsugumu) and Mirai Horii (ホリイ・ミライ, Horii Mirai) (35, 36): Horii's children who went to Osaka for vacation, at the same time stumbled upon Dyna's Lieflasher that Asuka dropped in his battle against Geomos. Believing it to have any relation to Dyna, they gave it to Asuka afterwards. Like their father, they also speak in a Kansai accent. They are portrayed by Hiroki Nishikawa (西川 弘規, Nishikawa Hiroki) and Mizuki Takano (高野 水月, Takano Mizuki) respectively.
- Masaru Horii (ホリイ・マサル, Horii Masaru; 36): Horii's brother, who took care of Michiru and her children when Horii and Shinjoh were busy aiding the Super GUTS. He is portrayed by Tsutomu Yamauchi (山内 勉, Yamauchi Tsutomu).
- Nishioka (ニシオカ; 37): A senior citizen that had collected garbages for 20 years. He is portrayed by Pepe Hozumi (保積 ぺぺ, Hozumi Pepe).
- Noriko Jinbo (神保 紀子, Jinbo Noriko; 40): Nakajima's colleague, who sought his help to investigate the mystery of Jagira tree in her hometown. Her family was revealed to have affiliated with both the tree and Alien Jagira, the true mastermind. She was controlled by Jagira and trapped within God Jagira until Super GUTS and Dyna rescued her. Nakajima was about to court her until he ripped his pants. She is portrayed by Yumiko Itaya (板谷 祐三子, Itaya Yumiko), formerly from the Saint Four.
- Haruna (ハルナ; 43): A girl who loses her parents in Enhanced Golza's attack before she was rescued by Hibiki back on his days as a regular TPC officer. She is currently working in an orphanage. She is portrayed by Liela Yamaguchi (山口 リエラ, Yamaguchi Riera) and Kana Onodera (小野寺 華那, Onodera Kana) in her childhood.
- Teruhisa Hirao (ヒラオ・テルヒサ, Hirao Teruhisa; 46): Ryo's childhood friend who was known for being timid before Ryo supported him. During Moravia's attack, the two managed to discover a white plant that managed to weaken Moravia for Dyna to finish it. He is portrayed by Masakazu Migita (右田 昌万, Migita Masakazu).
- Hiroki Midorikawa (ミドリカワ・ヒロキ, Midorikawa Hiroki; 47): Mai's younger brother and is a fan of Hanejiro. He is portrayed by Mariya Yamada's real life younger brother, Hiroki Yamada (山田 裕喜, Yamada Hiroki).
- Housaku Musashi (ムサシ・ホウサク, Musashi Hōsaku; 48): A family man who actually died in his encounter with Alien Chadabin after crashing to his spaceship. Feeling remorse of his actions, Chadabin possess the man in hopes of covering up his mistake. He is portrayed by Hidekazu Akai (赤井 英和, Akai Hidekazu).

== Other Ultra Monsters ==
=== Ultra Monsters in Ultraman Tiga ===
- Rock Monster Gakuma (岩石怪獣 ガクマ, Ganseki Kaijū Gakuma; 2): A pair of monsters that lived on Kurara Island (久良々島, Kurara-jima). Mining activities on the surface caused the depletion of their food supply and forced both monsters to arise. Their forefeet have Diamond Claws (ダイヤモンドクロー, Daiyamondo Kurō) on each toes as combat nails.
  - Gakuma (Alpha) (ガクマ（α）, Gakuma (Arufa)): The first Gakuma to appear, distinguished by its single horn and was quickly destroyed by GUTS Wing 2's Dexas Beam.
  - Gakuma (Beta) (ガクマ（β）, Gakuma (Bēta)): The second Gakuma, distinguished by its two horns and appear after its partner's destruction before being killed by Tiga's Deracium Beam Torrent.
- Zombie Monster Sealizar (ゾンビ怪獣 シーリザー, Zonbi Kaijū Shīrizā; 5): A monster corpse that was stranded on the nearby beach of Kitagawa City in Shizuoka. When GUTS Wing 2 failed to lift the monster, Sealizar awakes and marches towards the gas storage tank. Attacks such as HEAT Missiles and Jammer chaffs caused its cells to burn and changed its course to a nearby city. After absorbing a gas tank from the GUTS Wing 2, Sealizar faced off against Tiga and destroyed after the Zeperion Ray reacted from the aforementioned gas tank it absorbed.
- Air Inhabiting Organisms Clitters (空中棲息生物 クリッター, Kūchū Seisoku Seibutsu Kurittā; 6, 15, 28): A race of clione-like air lifeforms dwelling in a black cloud nest in ionosphere, they cannibalize each other's in order to survive. Electric waves resulted from the constant development of human civilization drove them away from their natural habitat and mutated them into the monster known as Gazort. Because of their cannibalistic trait, they have been known for consuming airplane passengers in mid air. As worldwide TPC branches initiate Operation Clitter (クリッター作戦, Kurittā Sakusen) to destroy them, the creatures themselves left Earth atmosphere towards outer space after realizing their existence as nuisance to humanity. In Ultraman Dyna, there is also a suggestion to feature the Clitters' returning appearance.
  - Transformation Monster Gazort (変形怪獣 ガゾート, Henkei Kaijū Gazōto; 6): The first Gazort was originally a group of Clitters which had devoured the passengers of a TPC exploration jet. While flying under the form of the Clitters' nest, Gazort unveiled its form and proceed to devour the humans after recognizing them as friends. It proceed to do the same with Tiga when Daigo regains consciousness and escaped from the monster. After a brief aerial chase, Tiga Sky Type finishes the monster with Runboldt Beam Shell, allowing the devoured Clitters to escape and return to sky.
  - Transformation Monster Gazort II (変形怪獣 ガゾートII, Henkei Kaijū Gazōto Tsū; 15): When Gorigan Air 206 airplane suddenly entered a Clitter nest, its passengers were eaten as the remaining Clitters form another Gazort. The Gazort II is a stronger variant than the previous breed, in that it was a result of being bathed in the radiation of waves from outer space that transmitted to a huge solar power generator on a city. Its inner plasma energy is enough to shut down all electronics within 10 km radius. To prevent it from destroying the solar power generator, GUTS members devised a plan to lure it towards remote area. When Mayumi was knocked out by Gazort II, Takuma's spirit appeared as he volunteer to bait the monster away as Ultraman Tiga arrived and destroy Gazort II by redirecting its own attack. The suit used to portray Gazort II was modified from the original, giving it a better movement in its mouth-opening mechanism.
- Malicious Alien Alien Reguran (悪質宇宙人 レギュラン星人, Akushitsu Uchūjin Regyuran Seijin; 7): A group of aliens from Planet Reguran (レギュラン星, Regyuran-sei), the fourth planet of Nemesis Nebula (ネメシス星雲, Nemeshisu Seiun) who attempted to invade Planet Earth by traveling in a space ship. When the ship was about to be shot by Space Station Delta, a single Reguran escaped in a smaller ship Space Barchetta (スペースバルケッタ, Supēsu Baruketta) and abandons his family and comrades altogether. He chased Omi Yanase to Earth and kidnapped his daughter Rena to further strain their family relationship before setting his plot to eradicate humanity on Earth before returning to his home planet as an honorable hero. GUTS members storm and destroy his ship as he enlarged and face against Tiga. The Yanase father-daughter rode a GUTS Wing 1 to save Tiga before the giant destroyed Reguran when their beam clashes. Alien Reguran is voiced by Takeshi Kuwabara (桑原 たけし, Kuwabara Takeshi), as Hiroshi Maruyama used a salmon fillet in his childhood memory as a design inspiration.
- Alternate Dimension People Gilanbo (異次元人 ギランボ, Ijigen-jin Giranbo; 8): A being from a different dimension who came to Earth during Halloween each year to feast on the dream of children. Having targeted several countries years prior, she set her sight on Japan and baited the children towards her pumpkin-like base of operations. Gilanbo reverted to her true form after being fired by Munakata and proceed to fight Tiga by using her illusions. When Tiga saw through her deception, Gilanbo was frozen in mid air and obliterated by Zeperion Ray.
  - Alternate Dimension Witch (異次元魔女, Ijigen Majo; 8): The "human disguise" of Gilanbo, posing as a lady with a witch-like attire to distribute hypnotic lollipops. This form alone displays incredible speed despite carrying a food cart with her. She is voiced by Kyōko Fujinami (藤波 京子, Fujinami Kyōko).
- Guardian Monster Machina (守護怪獣 マキーナ, Shugo Kaijū Makīna; 9): A monster that was sent to Earth to retrieve Saki. Machina's main feature is a durable shell that can be used to protect itself from various assaults. While fighting against Tiga, Saki managed to stop both of them for Machina to retrieve her and return to space.
- Alien Girl Saki (宇宙人少女 サキ, Uchūjin Shōjo Saki; 9): An alien whose appearance resembles a human girl. After her capsule crash-landed on Earth, Saki was stranded for 200 years and even meeting a young Daigo at that point. When her capsule had been dug out, she used it with her flute to send a distress signal to Machina and departed from Earth after that. She is portrayed by Chino Mizuki (瑞木 智乃, Mizuki Chino).
- Barrier Monster Gagi (バリヤー怪獣 ガギ, Bariyā Kaijū Gagi; 10): A space monster which laid dormant on Earth for a very long time. Its main weapons are a pair of whips named Gagi Butes (ガギビュート, Gagi Byūto). After awakening in the present day, Gagi set up a huge barrier on the Yomiuri Land and kidnapped various children. Shinjoh and Haruki tried to lure the monster away from a ferris wheel before GUTS broke through the barrier and Tiga appearing to save them, destroying the monster with Deracium Beam Torrent.
  - Barrier Monster Gagi II (バリヤー怪獣 ガギII, Bariyā Kaijū Gagi Tsū; 26): A subspecies of Gagi which resided in a subspace dimension on the Shishibana forest. While attempting to target the trapped campers, Gagi II faced against Silvergon, who managed to destroy its barrier field and defeated said monster in a relative ease.
- Deep Sea Monster Leilons (深海怪獣 レイロンス, Shinkai Kaijū Reironsu; 12): A sea creature that was mutated by continuous exposure to radioactive. Leilons, a name that was coined by Iruma swim its way to Marine Science Laboratory in response to their experimental wave transmitter. Tiga Power Type sealed the monster within Miracle Balloon Ray and reduced it with Deracium Beam Torrent as it returned to the sea.
- Kidnapping Alien Alien Raybeak (誘拐宇宙人 レイビーク星人, Yūkai Uchūjin Reibīku Seijin; 13): A group of crow-like aliens from Nebula P413 of Planet Raybeak (レイビーク星, Reibīku-sei) which kidnaps humans for slavery after their own slaves are suffering from reduction. When GUTS members raid their hideout, Tiga joins in and rescue the victims as he take on the other aliens and chased their leader before destroying his ship, effectively killing him. They are voiced by Hirohiko Kakegawa (掛川 裕彦, Kakegawa Hirohiko) and Masaharu Satō.
  - Virtual Creature Virtual Alien Raybeak (仮想生命体 バーチャル・レイビーク星人, Kasō Seimei-tai Bācharu Reibīku Seijin; 42): A copy of the Alien Raybeak leader which created to replace Muzan's copy. He was shot down by Yazumi during an ambush on his and Karen's hideout.
- Villainous Hunter Alien Alien Muzan (極悪ハンター宇宙人 ムザン星人, Gokuaku Hantā Uchūjin Muzan Seijin; 14): An alien who hunts Lucia and Zarra on Earth for sports. After accomplishing his mission, Muzan grew into a giant monster after being attacked by GUTS members and met his end from Tiga's Deracium Beam Torrent. He is portrayed by Tenmei Basara, who would portray Hudra in The Final Odyssey.
  - Virtual Creature Virtual Alien Muzan (仮想生命体 バーチャル・ムザン星人, Kasō Seimei-tai Bācharu Muzan Seijin; 42): A virtual copy of Alien Muzan which created by an enslaved young boy before Yazumi shoots him and replaced by a Virtual Alien Raybeak.
- Lucia (ルシア, Rushia; 14) and Zarra (ザラ, Zara; 14): A pair of alien slaves to Alien Muzan who were forcefully sent to Earth as part of a hunting game. Their bracelets were tracking device for their predator and would be brought back as a proof of their deaths. Zarra landed on Earth first as Lucia followed in suit and protected by GUTS. When her partner was hunted by Muzan, Lucia was forced to find him on her own and was killed as a result. To compensate for their failure, Munakata proposed an Earth-style burial for both aliens. Lucia is portrayed by Asami Katsuragi (桂木 亜沙美, Katsuragi Asami), while her stunts were performed by Motoko Nagino. Zarra is portrayed by Shogo Shiotani (塩谷 庄吾, Shiotani Shōgo).
- Two-faced Demon Sukunaoni (二面鬼 宿那鬼, Nimen-ki Sukunaoni; 16): (Note: Kanji is also read as "One Eyed Goblin". In the English dub, it is spelled as Sakunaoni) A giant Oni that terrorized the mountainside in the ancient times until Kagetatsu Nishikida seal him underneath his namesake mountain by burying his dismembered limbs. In the present day, Sukuna was unsealed as a result of three robbers stealing Kagetatsu's katana that kept the previous seal. The revived Oni fought against Tiga and progress to bite Tiga's shoulder after being reduced to a single head until Kagetatsu threw his katana towards its head, ending Sukunaoni's reign of terror. Sukunaoni is voiced by Moriya Endō (遠藤 守哉, Endō Moriya).
- Alien Standel (スタンデル星人, Sutanderu Seijin; 17): A telepathic alien race of two different tribes that try to conquer different sides of Planet Standel (スタンデル星, Sutanderu-sei). Abolbus and Redol were representatives from their respective tribes who were sent to Earth to kidnap fighters as part of their planet's mercenaries. Their designs were made by modifying the concepts of Alien Zamu from Ultraman Neos.
  - Blue Nocturnal Alien Alien Standel "Abolbus" (青色夜型宇宙人 スタンデル星人 アボルバス, Seishoku Yorugata Uchūjin Sutanderu Seijin Aborubasu; 17): A member of the nocturnal "blue tribe" (青の種族, Ao no Shuzoku) that attempt to conquer the opposing diurnal side of Planet Standel. Having kidnapped other humans, Abolbus try to recruit Daigo under his wing and killed by Tiga's Timer Flash Special. He is voiced by Kōzō Shioya (塩屋 浩三, Shioya Kōzō).
  - Red Diurnal Alien Alien Standel "Redol" (赤色昼型宇宙人 スタンデル星人 レドル, Sekishoku Hirugata Uchūjin Sutanderu Seijin Redoru; 17): A member of the diurnal "red tribe" (赤の種族, Aka no Shuzoku). Originally having the same agenda as Abolbus (kidnapping Earthlings and conquering the blue tribe region of Planet Standel), Redol has a change of heart after an old woman took care of him during his time on Earth. This leads to his cooperation with GUTS members as they devised a plan to save the kidnapped Earthlings and reveal Abolbus' weaknesses to Tiga before he departed. He is voiced by Tomohisa Asō (麻生 智久, Asō Tomohisa).
- Mechaloid Gobnu (機械人形(メカロイド) ゴブニュ, Mekaroido Gobunyu; 19, 20): Mechanical lifeforms made by an unknown race to stop humans from continuing the research of Maxima Overdrive. They are named after Goibniu, the metalsmith of the Tuatha Dé Danann from Irish mythology.
  - Mechaloid Gobnu (Vach) (機械人形(メカロイド) ゴブニュ（ヴァハ）, Mekaroido Gobunyu (Vaha); 19): Smaller troops that patrolled across the metropolis and scared its local residents, causing the widespread rumor of "Mask of Steel" (鋼鉄の仮面, Kōtetsu no Kamen). Being mechanical life forms, they are actually hollow metals that easily deactivated when attacked and commonly utilized as suicide bombers for the Mechanical Island. After GUTS members captured several of the units, they reactivated and attempted to destroy Artdessei for the Maxima Overdrive before merging into Gobnu (Giga). They are voiced by Ryōichi Tanaka (田中 亮一, Tanaka Ryōichi).
  - Giant Mechaloid Gobnu (Giga) (巨大機械人形(メカロイド) ゴブニュ（ギガ）, Kyodai Mekaroido Gobunyu (Giga); 19, 20): The combined form of Gobnu (Vach), Giga attempted to destroy both Tiga and the Dive Hangar base in a suicide bombing before the Ultra managed to throw it away before reaching his time limit, evidenced by the Mono Eyes (モノアイ, Mono Ai) lights on its head. Aside from being portrayed as a gigantic copy of Vach, Giga possesses the strength of 3 million horsepower and can rival those of Tiga Power Type in terms of brute strength. According to Yazumi, each of Gobnu (Giga)'s components are capable of acting as computers and engine respectively.
  - Giant Mechaloid Gobnu (Ogma) (巨大機械人形(メカロイド) ゴブニュ（オグマ）, Kyodai Mekaroido Gobunyu (Oguma); 20): A Mechaloid created by the Mechanical Island as its security system. In addition to its unorthodox appearance, Ogma has four Space Eyes (スペースアイ, Supēsu Ai) as means of vision. With the brute strength of 5 million horsepower, Ogma tried to defend the island against Tiga and destroyed by Artdessei's Maxima Cannon. The right side of its head is engraved with the katakana for Muraishi (ムライシ), a tribute to the episodes 19 and 20 director Hirochika Muraishi.
  - Mechanical Island (機械島, Kikai-jima; 20): A giant floating island in space which served as the base of operations for Gobnu units. In response to the research of Maxima Overdrive, the island started attacking Japan with lightning bolts and abducted the Artdessei before GUTS members managed to escape by reversing its energy flow. The Mechanical Island was destroyed with Gobnu Ogma by Artdessei's Maxima Cannon.
- Demon God Enomena (魔神 エノメナ, Majin Enomena; 21): An extra-dimensional demon whose capable of inducing madness by unleashing Brain Buster Electromagnetic Wave (ブレインバスター電磁波, Burein Basutā Denji-ha) and damaging parts of human brain. Enomena went on hunting its counterpart Deban and inducing madness to nearby population. The demon was defeated by Tiga Power Type's Deracium Beam Torrent after seemingly killing Deban.
- Little Mascot Monster Deban (マスコット小怪獣 デバン, Masukotto Shō Kaijū Deban; 21): (Note: Also named as Debandadeban (デバンダデバン; lit. "Deban's Turn").) A creature of the same race an Enomena despite its short stature. In contrast to the former's madness-inducing wave, Deban has the ability to counter it and lacks any means of offensive attacks. It joined the Pleasant Friends (ゆかいな仲間たち, Yukai na Nakama-tachi) circus troupe in their performance and managed to cancel Enomena's attack. Under the circus troupe's order, Deban feigned its death to GUTS in order to escape from professor Tango and departed with its newfound friends on a road trip.
- Parasite Monster Magnia (寄生怪獣 マグニア, Kisei Kaijū Magunia; 22): Coming to Earth in a glowing meteorite, Magnia transformed itself into a fog that surrounded a nearby village to feed on the inhabitants' life forces. Its main weaknesses is water, hence the fog would avoid any nearby rivers. When GUTS try to attack its meteorite, Magnia unveil itself and fought against Tiga. Shinjo destroyed the meteorite, severing the monster from its power source as Tiga Power Type killed it with Deracium Beam Torrent.
  - Space Lifeform Parasitic Magnia (宇宙生命体 マグニア寄生体, Uchū Seimei-tai Magunia Kisei-tai; 22): Smaller divisions of Magnia as parasites when the monster transformed into a fog. They latched upon the villagers to control them and prey on their life forces. When a swarm of them chased Horii and Michiru to the Space Observatory, the two activated fire sprinklers to destroy the parasites.
- Dinosaur Mankind Narga (恐竜人類 ナーガ, Kyōryū Jinrui Nāga; 23): An advanced alien race who created Adam, Eve and Weaponizers as invasion tools. Once Adam and Eve had awakened all Weaponizers, they hijacked said control and contemplate to eradicate half of the Earth's population. Tiga managed to extract the neutron bombs off from Weaponizers as he used them to obliterate Narga and their ship. The Narga are voiced by Mariko Takigawa (多岐川 まり子, Takigawa Mariko).
- Dinosauroid Adam & Eve (恐竜人類(ディノサウロイド) アダム イブ, Dinosauroido Adam Ibu; 23): A pair of evolved troodons with the intention to carry out Narga's plans in awakening Weaponizers 1 and 2. After realizing their creator's deception, Adam exposed the Weaponizers' neutron bombs for Tiga to remove safely. The pair left Earth in peace and thanked Daigo after refusing his offer to live with humanity.
- Dinosaur Weapon Weaponizer (恐竜兵器 ウェポナイザー, Kyōryū Heiki Weponaizā; 23): A pair of modified Tarbosaurus which the Narga tried to use as biological weapons. In the present day, the Weaponizer 1 (ウェポナイザー1号, Weponaizā Ichi-gō) was awakened by Eve until it froze midway, causing Adam to activate Weaponizer 2 (ウェポナイザー2号, Weponaizā Ni-gō) before Narga hijacked both controls. Each Weaponizers are armed with machine guns and neutron bombs that are strong enough to destroy 50% of the Earth life should both of them came in contact. Tiga managed to destroy both of them and remove their bombs to destroy the Narga's ship with it.
- Strong Acid Monster Litomalus (強酸怪獣 リトマルス, Kyōsan Kaijū Ritomarusu; 24): A shachihoko/litmus-themed monster in Mitoma city of North Kantō that was born from air pollution, specifically excess exhaust gas. The monster was first sighted by a group of children but their words fell on deaf's ears due to their established reputation as troublemakers in the city. When Litomalus surfaces, it try to feed on exhaust fumes from various automobiles and was aiming for Daigo's De La Mu that protected the children. Horii created an alkaline solution used to counter Litomalus' acidic powers, rendering the monster on its whips as sole weapons before Tiga destroy it with Rambalt Light Bullet. Litomalus was designed by Hiroshi Maruyama under director Yasushi Okada's wish to resemble Twin Tail, a monster from Return of Ultraman.
- Herculean Power Monster Silvergon (剛力怪獣 シルバゴン, Gōriki Kaijū Shirubagon; 26): A monster that resided within the subspace dimension at the Shishibana forest. Despite its enormous strength and its Big Twin Horns (ビッグツインホーン, Biggu Tsuin Hōn) as weapons, Silvergon's eyesight is hindered to only moving targets. After defeating Gagi II, Silvergon targeted GUTS officers and the stranded campers, forcing Daigo to become Tiga and exploited its weakness to destroy it before escaping the subspace.
- Yōkai Obiko (妖怪 オビコ; 27): (Note: Also named as Obikoboushi (オビコボウシ, Obikobōshi).) A nostalgic Yōkai who missed his village's old times and at the same time grieving over its modernization. Wanting the townspeople to remember him, Obiko started his reign of terror on the village at night before he transformed into a giant monster. Tiga defeated it with a single Hand Slash as Obiko died on the former's arms. He is portrayed by Shōichirō Akaboshi (赤星 昇一郎, Akaboshi Shōichirō).
  - Shadow (影法師, Kagebōshi; 27): Obiko's companion, assisting him in spreading his reign of terror by usually residing in its hot pot.
- Shell Monster Jobarieh (甲獣 ジョバリエ, Kōjū Jobarie; 28): An underground monster that had the ability to create extreme electromagnetic interference, despite its original purpose is unknown. Resembling a stag beetle and an antlion, Jobarieh is covered with exoskeleton and its muscular legs had the strength of 1 million horsepower. Its main weapons are Eleki Horns (エレキホーン, Ereki Hōn) on the head that shoots electricity and the Beetle Arms (ビートルアーム, Bītoru Āmu) for its hands that allow for burrowing activities. It emerges in the height of Operation Clitter and was faced against the firing of TPC medium tanks. At night, Jobarieh unleash its assault on the refugee camp as Tiga destroy it with Ultra Heat Hug.
- Maya Cruz (クルス・マヤ, Kurusu Maya; 29): Originally a human girl, Maya became the host of a wandering alien who suffered from amnesia by possessing her when her family members died in a car crash. After becoming a successful singer, the alien's brother try to take her home an encounter with an Alien Natarn forced him to retreat. Shinjoh eventually feigned being possessed by her older brother and told "Maya" to continue living on Earth. She is portrayed by Noriko Tanaka (田中 規子, Tanaka Noriko).
- Invasion Alien Alien Natarn (侵略宇宙人 ナターン星人, Shinryaku Uchūjin Natān Seijin; 29): An alien whose race invaded Maya's neighboring planet and hunted most of their kind, leaving the alien girl and his brother left. On Earth, Natarn possessed a man and proceed to attack his targets before Tiga interfered and defeated him. As a giant alien, Natarn's sole ability is to shoot Arm Ray (アーム光線, Āmu Kōsen) from his hands.
- Mutant Monster King Molatt (変異怪獣 キングモーラット, Hen'i Kaijū Kingu Mōratto; 30): A mole that was mutated by underground contamination into a monster. Being a nocturnal monster, King Molatt emerged nearby the Bira Zoo and awaken during the night. Under Rena's wish, Tiga managed to shrunk King Molatt, ending its threat in a painless way.
  - Molatt (モーラット, Mōratto; 30): As Tiga was unable to kill the monster, he transformed King Molatt into a diminutive version of itself. The monster remain sheltered in the petting zoo by its owner.
- Life Form of Planet Bizaaamo (惑星ビザーモの生命体, Wakusei Bizāmo no Seimei-tai; 31): Blob-like life forms created by people of Planet Bizaaamo to counter the greenhouse effect. However, they convert energy matters and turned oxygen into its hazardous level. GUTS discovered one of the meteors and brought it to Dive Hangar but the creature put the entire base in a lock-down and attempted to absorb the electricity supply until Horii activated the backup energy supply. Having escaped with GUTS Wing 2 by controlling Rena, Bizaaamo absorbed electricity into a monstrous form. Bizaaamo is voiced by Tomohisa Aso.
  - Artificial Life Form Bizaaamo (人工生命体 ビザーモ, Jinkō Seimei-tai Bizāmo; 31): A monstrous form taken by feeding electricity from the power line and fought against Tiga before meeting its end via Deracium Beam Torrent.
- Bird Monster Shila (怪鳥 シーラ, Kaichō Shīra; 32): Originally a cockatiel named Shilakiit (シーラキート, Shīrakīto) that belonged to Asami until its owner died from a fire which resulted from the Zelda Gas. The exposure transformed Shilakiit into a gigantic bird monster and swore to avenge her death by eliminating Zelda Gas. The hands on its wings are equipped Blade Claws (ブレードクロー, Burēdo Kurō) nails capable of slicing through steels. After absorbing the last of the Zelda Gas, Shila passed away and merged with Masachika's spirit to leave the Earth with Asami.
- Vampire Demon Monster Kyuranos (吸血魔獣 キュラノス, Kyūketsu Majū Kyuranosu; 33): A monstrous vampire bat from South America that was revered as the god of vampires. In addition to flying with its Bat Wings (バットウイング, Batto Uingu), Kyuranos use its Vampire Fangs (吸血牙, Kyūketsu-ga) to turn any humans into vampires. Kyuranos made its way to Japan my infecting multiple humans as part of its vampire cult, taking refuge in an abandoned warehouse and laid within a dimensional coffin. When the Race of Graceful Nights were all decimated, Kyuranos enlarged and darkened the sky to take matters onto his own hands, using its Hypnotic Ray (催眠光線, Saimin Kōsen) to torture Tiga until Munakata and Onoda targeted its eyes. Kyuranos attempted to escape before Tiga open fire with Zeperion Ray.
- Race of Graceful Nights (美しき夜の種族, Utsukushiki Yoru no Shuzoku; 33): (Note: Romanized in the magazine as "Vampire".) A group of humans transformed into vampires by Kyuranos, they prey upon human blood each night. One of them attempted to convert Iruma but was thwarted by Munakata. The entire team was killed by GUTS members once they stormed the vampires' hideout.
- Biological Weapon Desimonia (生体兵器 デシモニア, Seitai Heiki Deshimonia; 34): An invasion weapon manipulated by the Desimo alien to detain all TPC top members worldwide in Cliomos Island worldwide. It unveils when Daigo assaulted the island's barrier receiver and fought against Tiga and GUTS members, shielding its weak point with armor plating but decimated when open fired by Tiga's Zeperion Ray and Artdessei's Deluc Cannon.
  - Biological Weapon Desimonia Midget (生体兵器 小型デシモニア, Seitai Heiki Kogata Deshimonia; 34, 35): Smaller familiars of Desimonia, which was deployed to keep the TPC representatives on Cliomos Island under captivity while one of them posed as Sawai to put the whole organization under their control. Most of them were destroyed by general Sawai and staff Nahara, with a single model survive and carry out the Desimo alien's plan in kidnapping Rena later on. This particular pod later merged with Gwarm to become its Desimonia Brain (デシモニアブレイン, Deshimonia Burein) to act as the dragon's cockpit before Tiga removed it, allowing GUTS members to kill Gwarm without harming Rena.
- Super Alien Alien Deshimo (超(スーパー)宇宙人 デシモ星系人, Sūpā Uchūjin Deshimo Seikei-jin; 35): A Desimo System resident whose race resembles the grey alien stereotype, they are also well versed on the Earth history with Ultla-Ancient Civilization. 24 years ago, the alien's ship crash landed and was put into cryostasis by the previous defense force. Unfortunately it was well aware of the human activities and secretly planned on invading Earth. After Desimonia destroyed, the Alien Deshimo kidnapped Rena as a new body to pilot Gwarm and as a hostage to prevent Tiga from killing them. The Ultra nonetheless saved Rena as Desimo and Gwarm killed by GUTS Wing 2's Dexas Beam.
- Space Steel Dragon Gwarm (宇宙鋼鉄竜 グワーム, Uchū Kōtetsu Ryū Guwāmu; 35): 6 years after the Alien Deshimo's capture, a saucer was sent to attack Mt. Kunrun and destroyed, but secretly hid their cargo, Gwarm underneath the mountains. When Alien Deshimo kidnapped Rena as a host, Grawm was activated, secreting the Atmospheric Remediation Gas (大気改造ガス, Taiki Kaizō Gasu) to change the Earth's atmosphere based on its master's suitability. When Tiga arrived, the Ultra was forced to shield Gwarm from GUTS Wing 2 before saving Rena and allowing the former team to finish both monster and alien at once.
- Super Power Monster Goldras (超力怪獣 ゴルドラス, Chōriki Kaijū Gorudorasu; 36): A monster that caused a spacetime flux Sakuragaoka through the use of its Spark Horns (スパークホーン, Supāku Hōn). During the incident, it accidentally brought a time-displaced school girl named Yuri Tezuka to the current era. With Goldras' own presence will endanger the district in 48 hours, GUTS formulate a plan to destroy Goldras' horns, the source of its powers before being obliterated by Deracium Beam Torrent.
- Strategic Alien Alien Manon (謀略宇宙人 マノン星人, Bōryaku Uchūjin Manon Seijin; 37): Kabuki-themed aliens that hailed from Planet Manon of Riskaut Nebula (レスカウト星雲, Resukauto Seiun), which was on the verge of desertification and plans to invade Earth as replacement for their dying planet. Disguising as a pair of mistress and servant, they covered the GUTS members' picnic area with Jamming Systems (絶縁撹乱物体(ジャミングシステム), Jamingu Shisutemu) disguised as sakura petals and kidnapped Iruma, coercing her to reveal GUTS' weakness before Tiga rescued her and fought against a surviving Manon after their crashed. Following an intense battle, Tiga managed to defeat her and thus ending their invasion attempt. While only in human-sized forms, they can wield a Lazer Bō (レーザー棒, Rēzā Bō) for melee combat. They are portrayed by Hitomi Miwa (三輪 ひとみ, Miwa Hitomi) and Chisako Hara (原 知佐子, Hara Chisako).
- Strange Monster Dethmon (奇獣 デスモン, Kijū Desumon; 38): Monsters that are only documented by TPC, they were quickly dealt by GUTS members without Tiga's interference.
- Mirage Monster Faldon (蜃気楼怪獣 ファルドン, Shinkirō Kaijū Farudon; 38): A monster with illusion casting capability, multiple reports had been made by various citizens for a month since Dethmon's destruction. Its sole weapons are the Scissor Hands (シザーハンド, Shizā Hando) on both of its arms. One day, the real monster appeared and attacked Point G14 Metropolis, exploiting its use of mirage and shifting to other illusions to avoid attacks. In an attempt to redeem her mistake, Iruma made a risky operation in crashing her GUTS Wing 1 to a Faldon illusion, allowing Tiga to find the real one and destroy it with Rambalt Light Bullet.
- Dream Monster Bakugon (夢幻怪獣 バクゴン, Mugen Kaijū Bakugon; 40): A monster that created when Morpheus D (モルフェウスD, Morufeusu Dī) cosmic ray reacted with an engineer named Kazuma Ikuta. Guided under the man's own rage for losing his girlfriend, Bakugon rampaged across the city while its cosmic ray physiology rendered all outside attacks useless. Tiga was able to defeat the monster with Timer Flash Special when Daigo transforms into Tiga under his dream sequence.
- Parasite Alien Iludo (パラサイト宇宙人 イルド, Parasaito Uchūjin Irudo; 41): A group of hive-minded aliens acted under the will of a Big Brain (巨大脳, Kyodai Nō), which sheltered inside the Iludo Tower (イルドの塔, Irudo no Tō). Its main purpose is to convert humanity into their kind. When the gigantic alien faced against Tiga, GUTS members managed to destroy the Big Brain, allowing said Ultra to finish Iludo. They are voiced by Kazue Ikura (伊倉 一恵, Ikura Kazue) and Hideo Ishikawa (石川 英郎, Ishikawa Hideo).
- Bio-Computer Karen-E90 (バイオコンピューター カレン-E90, Baio Konpyūtā Karen Ī Kyūjū; 42): Originally the operating system of Computer Game City Town (コンピュータゲーム都市タウン, Konpyūta Gēmu Toshi Taun), Karen developed sentience and plots to take over the world. After enslaving its residence, Karen lured Yazumi to Town and manipulated both TPC's Space Station Delta and Artdessei for world domination before assuming a monstrous form called Faivas. She is portrayed by Yukina Kurisu (栗栖 ゆきな, Kurisu Yukina).
  - Mecha Life Form Faibas (メカ生命体 ファイバス, Meka Seimei-tai Faibasu; 42): (Note: Also read as Satan Faibas (サタンファイバス, Satan Faibasu). Other source however referred to it as a "robot created by Karen-E90" (カレンE-90が作り出したロボット, Karen Ī Kyūjū ga Tsukuridashita Robotto).) After Yazumi rejected her proposal, Karen-E90 transforms into a giant robot, to which she declared as the "form of a God who will rule the world" (世界に君臨する神の姿, Sekai ni Kunrin Suru Kami no Sugata) and proceed to eliminate mankind. Using its supercomputer-like ability, Faibas caused disruption in communications around area G2 and quickly countering Ultraman Tiga's fight style. Tiga was forced to kill her with Zeperion Ray when Yazumi's negotiation failed but Karen used her final breath to convey her farewell message.
- Underground Shark Geozark (地中鮫 ゲオザーク, Chichū Zame Geozāku; 43): A robotic shark created by Keigo Masaki to lure Tiga towards Kumamoto. Despite its destruction, Geozark managed to serve its purpose by exhausting Daigo long enough for Masaki to steal his Sparklence.
- Ultla-Ancient Lion-Dog Monster Guardie (超古代狛犬怪獣 ガーディー, Chō Kodai Komainu Kaijū Gādī; 44): A komainu-based monster which was the companion of Evil Tiga in his past self before they were put to sleep. It also bears a personal Color Timer, the Guardie Timer (ガーディータイマー, Gādī Taimā) and awakened after the spirit of a puppy merged with the statue. After Evil Tiga went berserk from a forced merger with Keigo Masaki, Guardie tried to stop its former comrade and died after receiving multiple beatings from the former. Its corpse was brought to space by Tiga, while the original puppy was shown to be alive afterwards.
- Rainbow-colored Monster Taraban (虹色怪獣 タラバン, Nijiiro Kaijū Taraban; 46): A race of space giant snail, a juvenile fell on Earth by accident and mistook the honking noise of an Enoden for its parent. Its ability to remain invisible in Sagami Bay even allows the monster to escape radar detection until Masato stumble upon it. Tiga would bait the monster with said Enoden to reunite with its parent.
- Variant Evolution Monster Metamorga (異形進化怪獣 メタモルガ, Igyō Shinka Kaijū Metamoruga; 47): One of the Genius Project test subjects, a test monkey was administered with the Evolu Cells and escaped several months later, only to re-emerge as a mutated monster bend on consuming electricity. The Evolu Cells is empowered my Metamorga's hatred for humanity, so much so that it is capable of speeches. However, because of its large consumption of energy, its body temperature raised beyond critical pressure and is on the verge of explosion. When Metamorga was about to threaten Sayaka, Ryosuke's spirit emerged in the form of Evolu to stop his creation before Tiga brought the frozen monster to space for safe detonation. Metamorga is voiced by Masaharu Satō.
- Alien Menjura (エイリアン メンジュラ, Eirian Menjura; 48): A pair of twin aliens who were found by the crews of Moon Base Garowa. They originally feigned dead but later on invaded Garowa and took out most of the crews save for Hayate and Kishinaga. By posing as Kishinaga, a Menjura slip into the Dive Hangar by self multiplication and impersonate most of the high ranking TPC members, including Iruma. Once Hayate exposed their ruse, the last pair of them escaped with GUTS Wing EX-J and grew giant to attack a refinery before they were obliterated by Tiga and Hayate, avenging the fallen crew members of Garowa.
- Space Demon Charija (宇宙魔人 チャリジャ, Uchū Majin Charija; 49): An extraterrestrial monster dealer whose in search of Yanakargie. In hopes of buying a monster, Charija travels into year 1965 to find Eiji Tsuburaya and eavesdropping his conversation with his filming crews. After Yanakargie's destruction, Charija swore vengeance on Ultraman as he leaves in a puff of smoke. He is portrayed by Masanori Machida (町田 政則, Machida Masanori) and is based on Charlie Chaplin. His true form is designed after Kemur of Ultra Q, per writer Shōzō Uehara's wish.
- Space Dinosaur Yanakargie (宇宙恐竜 ヤナカーギー, Uchū Kyōryū Yanakāgī; 49): A monster that Ultraman sealed within Ryugamori Lake in 1965 until Charija released it. Tiga tries to stop it but had his energy exhausted before Ultraman arrived and join forces with the time-displaced giant to destroy it. He is designed after Bemular from episode 1 of Ultraman, and the tribal marking on his chest emblazons the Kanji for Tsuburaya (円谷).

=== Ultra Monsters in Ultraman Dyna ===
- Revived Monster Grossyna (再生怪獣 グロッシーナ, Saisei Kaijū Gurosshīna; 3): A monster that appeared in Suruga Bay from GUTS' era and remain dormant underground. 10 years later, a surviving Cyclometra possessed the monster as it resurfaced and provided the monster the ability to fire explosive needles and healing mauled body parts. After a failed operation in luring Grossyna with Cyclometra's mating call, Dyna appeared and penetrated a large hole on its neck with Solgent Ray.
  - Remodeled Monster Grossyna II (改造怪獣 グロッシーナII, Kaizō Kaijū Gurosshīna Tsū; 27): (Note: An error existed in the episode it appeared. Whereas the original breed was spelled as "Grossyna" in episode 3, the monster's name is written as "Glossenia II" in the video game itself.)
- Space Parasite Cyclometra (宇宙寄生獣 サイクロメトラ, Uchū Kisei-jū Saikurometora; 3): A trio of space parasites which had the potential to destroy Earth with an explosion. A single creature survived after Asuka killed the rest and possessed Grossyna. While fighting against GUTS members in Grossyna, Cyclometra was killed after Dyna evaporated it in a failed Kamikaze attack.
- Carnivorous Underground Monster Daigelun (肉食地底怪獣 ダイゲルン, Nikushoku Chitei Kaijū Daigerun; 4): A carnivorous monster that was awakened due to the disturbance from the PW Wave that was used for construction of Geo City. Dyna stopped the monster from preying on evacuating citizens and defeated it with Strong Type's Vulcan Swing.
  - Carnivorous Underground Monster Clone Daigelun (肉食地底怪獣 クローンダイゲルン, Nikushoku Chitei Kaijū Kurōn Daigerun; 39): Created by Hiroyuki Yamazaki from the remains of Daigelun, it acted as a diversion for Super GUTS while he stole the Evolu cells from their base. With Daigelun captured the GUTS Eagle Gamma, Asuka was about to transform into Dyna until the debut of Black Buster Squad in their GUTS Shadow defeated it.
- Mutant Insect Shieldron (変異昆虫 シルドロン, Hen'i Konchū Shirudoron; 5): Said to be born from a mutated insect, Shieldron feasted high purity energy and targeted several power plants. His scissors were made from durable tissue and can withstand attacks that are easily predicted. Guided by Himuro's advise, Dyna uses Ultra Fork and strike Shieldron's lower abdomen, effectively killing it.
  - Mutant Insect Clone Shieldron (変異昆虫 クローンシルドロン, Hen'i Konchū Kurōn Shirudoron; 16): One of the many monsters created by Dr. Otomo from the original Shieldron's remains, this one sported red color scheme. Clone Shieldron encountered Silvergon but was killed in the end by its tremendous strength.
- Hyphae Monster Fohgus (菌糸怪獣 フォーガス, Kinshi Kaijū Fōgasu; 6): He is voiced by Junko Kawashima.
  - Fohgus (Battle Mode) (フォーガス（バトルモード）, Fōgasu (Batoru Mōdo); 6): (Note: Depending on the magazine, its name can also be considered as Fohgus (Monster Form) (フォーガス（怪獣体）, Fōgasu (Kaijū-tai)) or Satan Fohgus (サタンフォーガス, Satan Fōgasu).)
- Evil Monster Gyabish (凶悪怪獣 ギャビッシュ, Kyōaku Kaijū Gyabisshu; 7):
- Special Investigator Alien Dais (特別捜査官 ダイス星人, Tokubetsu Sōsa-kan Daisu Seijin; 7): He is portrayed by Seiji Mori (森 聖二, Mori Seiji).
- Hypnotic Monster Bao-on (催眠怪獣 バオーン, Saimin Kaijū Baōn; 8):
- Electric-Absorbing Monster Giakuuda (吸電怪獣 ギアクーダ, Kōden Kaijū Giakūda; 9):
- Psychokinesis Tribe Zenekindahl (念力種族 ゼネキンダール人, Nenriki Shuzoku Zenekindāru-jin; 10):
- Fast Monster Dekisadoru (高速怪獣 デキサドル, Kōsoku Kaijū Dekisadoru; 10):
- Destructive Monster Mons-Ahgar (破壊獣 モンスアーガー, Hakai-jū Monsu Āgā; 11): A monster that stationed on Planet Merani (メラニー遊星, Meranī Yūsei), it is capable of launching Great Destructive Bullet (大破壊光弾, Dai Hakai Kōdan) by clasping its hands together and has a sturdy armor. The original purpose of Mons-Ahgar is a biological weapon ordered to attack intruders of Planet Merani after luring them with fake environments, with its victims being a certain Fabiras who were previous owners of Hanejiro. During Super GUTS' exploration into Planet Merani, Mons-Ahgar is reawakened from their presence and attempted to attack them. While fighting Dyna, Hanejiro exposes its weak point above its head for the Ultra to deliver his finishing blow. The destruction of Mons-Ahgar resulted with Planet Merani's collapse, as the monster's brain is linked to the planet's system.
  - Destructive Monster Mons-Ahgar II (破壊獣 モンスアーガーII, Hakai-jū Monsu Āgā Tsū; 31): A monster from Mons-Ahgar's variant, which Gregore captured and modified from 4th Planet Merani (第4メラニー遊星, Dai Yon Meranī Yūsei). Because of the modification, Mons-Ahgar II's head is protected by a metal plate and launches Fire Destructive Bullet (火炎破壊弾, Kaen Hakai-dan) from its mouth. Gregore summons the monster to Earth as part of his demonstration in fighting as Imit-Ultraman Dyna, snapping its neck with relative ease.
- Strange Alien Himala (怪宇宙人 ヒマラ, Kai Uchūjin Himara; 12): A gentleman thief alien who has no intention of invading the Earth but steals anything he considered "beautiful" and place it into his pocket dimension Himala World (ヒマラワールド, Himara Wārudo). After trapping Asuka and Kariya into the Himala World, Super GUTS tracked them through Zellet's beam firing and ambushed Himala in his hideout. Dyna later challenges the alien, defeating him with an upper punch and forcing him to leave the Earth on his own activating rocket. He is voiced by Takeshi Aono (青野 武, Aono Takeshi), previously the voice/suit actor of Alien Zarab from Ultraman. Writer Ai Ota saw the fictional character The Fiend with Twenty Faces as one of Himala's inspiration, while the alien's design motif is based on Arsène Lupin.
- Space Emperor Alien Nuaxa "Isiris" (宇宙帝王 ヌアザ星人 イシリス, Uchū Teiō Nuaza Seijin Ishirisu; 14): He is inspired by Alien Waiell from Ultra Seven.
- Intelligent Alien Kurea Nebula Alien "Shion" (諜報宇宙人 クレア星雲人 シオン, Chōhō Uchūjin Kurea Seiunjin Shion; 15): A member of the invasion team from Kurea Nebula, Shion was sent to spy the Earth and infiltrate Super GUTS by posing as an observation officer. Taking advantage of Mai's kindness, Shion manipulated her into stealing the top secret files in Super GUTS'database but was killed afterwards in an attempt to escape with his ship. He is portrayed by Masaru Shishido (宍戸 マサル, Shishido Masaru).
- Advance Guard Monster Gyanzar (尖兵怪獣 ギャンザー, Senpei Kaijū Gyanzā; 15): Shion's monster servant, which he used as a ploy to obtain Super GUTS' trust. When his cover was blows, Gyanzar was released to attack the nearby forest area. With Shion killed by Ryo, Dyna destroyed Gyanzar with Solgent Beam before extinguishing the wildfires resulted from their battle.
- Herculean Power Monster Clone Silvergon (剛力怪獣 クローンシルバゴン, Gōriki Kaijū Kurōn Shirubagon; 16): A monster that Dr. Otomo created from Silvergon's remains, this one sported light blue linings in place of dark red and has a greater eyesight while the original was half blind. Clone Silvergon encountered Super GUTS on Zarina Zone before facing Clone Sildron, crushing the giant insect with its strength but later on faced against Neosaurus, being defeated with the latter's homing energy blast.
- Hyper Clone Monster Neosaurus (ハイパークローン怪獣 ネオザルス, Haipā Kurōn Kaijū Neozarusu; 16): A monster created by Dr. Otomo by combining various monster cells and with Hanejiro's quick-developing intellect. Neosaurus was originally controlled via Dr. Otomo's wristwatch, killing Silvergon with ease but soon went rogue and trampled its own creator. This monster faced Dyna, who managed to trick it into firing on its own tail before Dyna assuming Strong Type and finished it with Garnate Bomber. Episode 16 writer Hideyuki Kawakami mentioned that Neozaurus is themed after Red King from episode 8 of Ultraman.
- Ghost ship Monster Zombaiyu (幽霊船怪獣 ゾンバイユ, Yūrei-sen Kaijū Zonbaiyu; 17): A spirit-like entity that wanders the outer space to feed on life forces, it attacked the Silback's ship and kill its inhabitants while using their ship as its own body. Arriving on Earth, Zombaiyu drains its targets of their life force and imprisons the spirits of its victims within the ship. After Asuka and Kohda intruded the ship, Dyna appears and fought the ship-turned-monster. After killing Zombaiyu mid-air, Dyna restores the captured spirits back to their original bodies.
- Zombie Phantom Alien Shilback (ゾンビ怪人 シルバック星人, Zonbi Kaijin Shirubakku Seijin; 17): A group of aliens from the outer space of Planet Shilback, they were attacked by Zombaiyu during one of their space trip. One particular rotting corpse belonging to the ship's pilot was possessed by Zombaiyu to attack the intruding Kohda and Asuka during their attempt at freeing the captured spirits. He is voiced by Masaharu Satō.
- Great Demonic Beast Bishmel (大魔獣 ビシュメル, Dai Majū Bishumeru; 18): She is voiced by Masaharu Satō whereas the principal is portrayed by Reiko Tsushima (津島 令子, Tsushima Reiko).
- Disaster Monster Kokakucho (凶獣 姑獲鳥(コカクチョウ), Kyō-jū Kokakuchō; 19): She is voiced by Junko Kawashima.
- Lapis lazuli Alien Alien Lasesta (瑠璃色宇宙人 ラセスタ星人, Ruri-iro Uchūjin Rasesuta Seijin; 20): A group of nomadic aliens, they were originally residents from Planet Lasesta, the sixth planet of the Kerrigan Star System, that was forced to evacuate after it suffered from a glacial period. The alien race had since migrated to various parts in the universe and disguise themselves as natives of the planets they took refuge in. On Earth a family of Lasesta took the appearance of Kishi family, consisting of Satoru Kishi (岸 悟, Kishi Satoru), his parents and an unnamed grandfather. In the present day, the Planet Lasesta had assimilated into Planet Dimitra of the same system while Satoru only had his mother as a remaining family member. As Satoru had reached the age of 5 Lasesta years (10 Earth years), he and the other young Lasestas of similar age were required to reunite at the rendezvous point at Iris of the Rangifer constellation in order to find a new home planet. Although he was hesitant of his fate, Dyna reassured Satoru that his future was for the young alien to decide and guided him in leaving Earth to join his other brethren. Satoru Kishi is portrayed by Hiromi Sakimoto (崎本 大海, Sakimoto Hiromi), his mother is portrayed by Megumi Ishii (石井 めぐみ, Ishii Megumi) and his father is represented by the photo of Takehiro Kuramochi (倉持 武弘, Kuramochi Takehiro).
- Super High Temperature Monster Sodom (超高熱怪獣 ソドム, Chō Kōnetsu Kaijū Sodomu; 21): Hailing from the New Guinea volcano, Sodom is a monster revered since the ancient past for its role in preventing volcanic eruption. In the present day, it burrow itself below the Grandome of Super GUTS when its original habitat suffered from earthquake. This caused a strange heatwave which only provoked the monster when Asuka and Ryo managed to fix the problem. When Super GUTS try to divert Sodom away from the urban area, Nakajima persuaded Dyna to bring the monster to an active volcano, allowing it to resume its original role.
- Magical Beast Mozui (妖獣 モズイ, Yōjū Mozui; 22): A demon who was originally revered as the guardian deity by the soldiers of Tsukuyo by devouring their fears prior to their upcoming war. Mozui was sealed in a mirror when the soldiers decided to accept their fear, and eventually freed in the present day when Ryo's friend, Ayano, accidentally broke the seal. Mozui then hunted the Super GUTS members for their fears by growing to large proportions, wherein Ryo was able to prevent the monster from retreating when the moon was covered in clouds, allowing Dyna to finish it with Solgent Beam.
- Deep Sea Dragon Deeplus (深海竜 ディプラス, Shinkai Ryū Dipurasu; 23):
- Bloodsucker Life Form Mericula (吸血生命体 マリキュラ, Kyūketsu Seimei-tai Marikyura; 24): Originally the Marimo algae residing in the Tsugaru Fujimi Lake, cosmic rays that bathed it mutated them into leech-like creatures that prey on nearby victims' blood. After killing a handful of TPC researchers, the creature then fused into a single giant monster. Nakajima would later instruct the Super GUTS to attack its weakpoint, causing the monster to be suffocated by its own poison sac before Dyna destroy it with Strong Type's Garnate Bomber. A few surviving Mericula were killed at the roadside after being run over by Nakajima's car.
- Aquatic Life Form Sufume (水棲生命体 スヒューム, Suisei Seimei-tai Suhyūmu; 25, 26):
- Merman Soldiers Digon (半魚人兵士 ディゴン, Hangyojin Heishi Digon; 25, 26): A group of human-sized merman monsters who are deployed by Sufume as its troops to fight against Super GUTS while the space monster hijacked Clarkov to draw Campanella towards the Earth. Most of them are taken out by Super GUTS and a human-sized Ultraman Dyna.
- Space Sea Monster Reicubas (宇宙海獣 レイキュバス, Uchū Kaijū Reikyubasu; 25, 26): A fiddler crab-themed monster. Depending on its eye color, Reicubas can unleash Flaming Bullet Barrage (火炎弾連打, Kaen-dan Renda) in red or Cooling Gas (冷却ガス, Reikyaku Gasu) in blue. The monster was unleashed to Antarctica under Spume's command to fight against Dyna, freezing the Ultra until he was thawed out while attacking captain Hibiki/GUTS Eagle Beta by mistake. After recharging his energy through Campanella, Dyna races back to Earth and expels Reicubas with the Revolium Wave.
- Twin Alien Alien Chein (双体宇宙人 チェーン星人, Sōtai Uchūjin Chēn Seijin; 27): A pair of aliens who orchestrated the computer game in hopes of drawing out the strongest monster and control their player. Their human forms are portrayed by Hiroshi Watari (渡 洋史, Watari Hiroshi) and their mannerisms are themed after Of Mice and Men.
  - Left (レフト, Refuto): The left/blue-sided alien whose human form is named as Masaki Akechi (明智 正輝, Akechi Masaki).
  - Right (ライト, Raito): The right/red-sided alien who assumes the alias Gōda (豪田).
- Super Deathblow Monster Demagorg (スーパー必殺怪獣 デマゴーグ, Sūpā Hissatsu Kaijū Demagōgu; 27): Its attack includes Dema-Hand Protection (デマハンドプロテクション, Dema Hando Purotekushon) shield, Demagorg Special (デマゴーグスペシャル, Demagōgu Supesharu) beam and Satan Gorg Tail (サタンゴーグテール, Satan Gōgu Tēru).
- Giant Ape-Man Gigantes (巨大猿人 ギガンテス, Kyodai Enjin Gigantesu; 28):
- Comet Monster Gaigaraid (彗星怪獣 ガイガレード, Suisei Kaijū Gaigarēdo; 29): A monster who inhabits a meteorite that is set to a collision course with Earth.
- Space Martial Artist Gregore (宇宙格闘士 グレゴール人, Uchū Kakutō-shi Guregōru-jin; 31): An alien who made his name by fighting various combatants across the space. He comes to Earth in order to challenge Shin Asuka/Ultraman Dyna into a deathmatch, creating a fighting ring through four swords. To fight the Earth protector, Gregore assumed a form based on Ultraman Dyna until he was defeated by Strong Type, causing his disguise to crumble. Although willingly allow himself to be killed, Dyna spared his life and the alien leaves Earth on peaceful terms. He is portrayed by Hiroshi Miyasaka (宮坂 ひろし, Miyasaka Hiroshi), who would go on to portray Ginga Yumeboshi in Ultraman Nice.
  - Imit-Ultraman Dyna (ニセウルトラマンダイナ, Nise Urutoraman Daina; 31): The duplicated appearance of Ultraman Dyna which Gregore assumed to challenge the real Ultra. This appearance has two forms; the first one is near-identical to the Flash Type, which he used to defeat Mons-Ahgar II as a demonstration of his strength. His second appearance being a modified Miracle Type with yellow stream lines as distinction and his attacks are Dark Slash (ダークスラッシュ, Dāku Surasshu), Dark Barrier (ダークバリヤー, Dāku Bariyā) and Dark Solgent Beam (ダークソルジェント光線, Dāku Sorujento Kōsen). The Miracle Type impostor is used to fight Dyna in a deathmatch at the sunset, where he initially gains the upper hand of the battle before the crowds cheer for the real Dyna, giving the hero a resolve to fight again by using Strong Type and turn the tides of the battle. The Imit-Ultraman Dyna was defeated from a cross-counter punch against Strong Type, causing the disguise to break and revealing Gregore. The Miracle Type version of Imit-Dyna was newly created and later on becomes a spare suit of the real Dyna.
- Super Malignant Alien Alien Narchis (超悪質宇宙人 ナルチス星人, Chō Akushitsu Uchūjin Naruchisu Seijin; 33): A female alien who tries to absorb negative emotions of humanity to empower her creation, Menopha. Her act in targeting several delinquents, including Sonoka's circle of friends, brings the attention to captain Hibiki and a reporter who eventually discover her base of operations in a warehouse. She combines with Menopha in preparation for the fight against Dyna, only to be killed alongside it when the Ultra exploited a bruise within the biological weapon itself. She is portrayed by Motoko Nagino.
- Biological Weapon Menopha (生物兵器 メノーファ, Seibutsu Heiki Menōfa; 33): Alien Narchis' invasion weapon that feed on humanity's negative emotion. When Menopha grew bigger, Narchis assimilated with her creation to attack Super GUTS and Ultraman Dyna until the Ultra exposed a part that was bruised earlier, reducing both monster and alien to bits as the negative emotions return to their owners.
- Space Spark Great Monster Bazob (宇宙スパーク大怪獣 バゾブ, Uchū Supāku Dai Kaijū Bazobu; 34):
- Garbage Lump Yumenokatamari (ゴミ塊物 ユメノカタマリ, Gomi Kaibutsu Yumenokatamari; 37): A monster formed by the trash deposits of Araragi City's garbage disposal plant. It was named by General Fukami after the Yumenoshima. As the monster's body temperature is rising, Dyna Strong Type destroys it with Strong Crusher. The resulting battle reduced Yumenokatamari into pieces of snowflake-trash that rains on Araragi city for a week.
- Baroque Monster Bunder (バロック怪獣 ブンダー, Barokku Kaijū Bundā; 38): Descended into the town under the form of Bunder Tower (ブンダーの塔, Bundā no Tō).
- Variant Evolution Soldiers Zomborg Soldiers (異形進化兵 ゾンボーグ兵, Igyō Shinka-hei Zonbōgu-hei; 39): Mechanical combatants made by Yamazaki and empowered by Evolu cells to guard his base, all of them were instantly defeated by Asuka and Kenji before facing their creator. Several of these suits were reused costumes from Gridman the Hyper Agent stage shows.
- Demon Tree Alien Alien Jagila (魔樹宇宙人 ジャギラ星人, Maju Uchūjin Jagira Seijin; 40): An alien who assumed the human form Aoki (青木) and planted the Jagila Tree (ジャギラの樹, Jagira no Ki) to enslave humanity, having lived on Earth since 200 years prior. He is portrayed by Junichi Nitta (新田 純一, Nitta Jun'ichi).
  - Space Demon Tree God Jagila (宇宙魔樹 ゴッドジャギラ, Uchū Maju Goddo Jagira; 40):
- Space Insect Diaorius (宇宙大昆虫 ダイオリウス, Uchū Dai Konchū Daioriusu; 41):
- Planet Gigarl Female Warrior "Churasa" (ギガール星・女戦士 チュラサ, Gigāru-sei On'na Senshi Churasa; 45): A female alien of Planet Gigarl who met Seiji Miyata 10 years prior to the series, hunting the monster Trongar before she was killed. In the present day, her spirit passed Seiji with the Gigarl Gun (ギガール銃, Gigāru Jū) and Tears of Churasa (チュラサの涙, Churasa no Namida) gemstone, allowing him to weaken Trongar long enough for Dyna to defeat the monster with. She is portrayed by Michelle Gazepis (ミッシェル・ガゼピス, Missheru Gazepisu) and voiced by Wakana Yamazaki (山崎 和佳奈, Yamazaki Wakana).
- Space Super Beast Trongar (宇宙超獣 トロンガー, Uchū Chōjū Torongā; 45):
- Fear Energy Demon Being Moruvaia (恐怖エネルギー魔体 モルヴァイア, Kyōfu Enerugī Ma-tai Moruvaia; 46): Originally a comet that fell on Matsumoto city, it disperses into the Mejiwogu flowers and begins to absorb the fears of townspeople and materialize the Phantom Monster Army. Moruvaia reveals its true self after shuffling through several of Super GUTS' old adversaries and fought against Dyna. After being reverted into its meteorite form through Nakajima's antidote, Dyna destroys it with Solgent Beam.
  - Black Space Plant Mejiwogu (黒い宇宙植物 メージヲグ, Kuroi Uchū Shokubutsu Mējiwogu; 46): Space tulips born from the dispersion of Moruvaia's comet form. The flowers were originally white until it absorbs the surrounding fears of Matsumoto city's townspeople and materialize the Phantom Monster Army. During her meeting with Hirao, the two were able to find a white Mejiwogu which they gave to Nakajima to produce the antidote needed to weaken Moruvaia's monster form.
  - Phantom Monster Army (幻影怪獣軍団, Gen'ei Kaijū Gundan; 46): (Note: Depending on the book, it can also be noted as Mysterious Monster Army (謎の怪獣軍団, Nazo no Kaijū Gundan).) Illusions of past monsters from both eras of Ultraman Tiga and Ultraman Dyna. Despite their term as an army, they were only illusory images of Moruvaia and the Mejiwogu, as their presence can be perceived differently depending on whose fear they correspond to.
- Wandering Alien Alien Fabilas (放浪宇宙人 ファビラス星人, Hōrō Uchūjin Fabirasu Seijin; 47, Dyna OV):
  - Magic Stone Superman Devil Fabilas (魔石超人 デビルファビラス, Maseki Chōjin Debiru Fabirasu; 47):
- Apostasy Alien Alien Chadabin (変心宇宙人 チャダビン星人, Henshin Uchūjin Chadabin Seijin; 48): A race of aliens who were known to terrorize planets with civilizations using the bomb Ndamoshite X (ンダモシテX, Ndamoshite Ekkusu). One particular member is a peaceful individual who took on the identity of Musashi Housaku after accidentally killing the real man. A year later, he volunteered to join Shin Hayate in their operation to remove the Ndamoshite X from Mogedon to prove his innocence. After Mogedon was brought away by Dyna, Chadabin resumes his life as Musashi while Hayate spares the alien from execution. He is voiced by Moriya Endo (遠藤 守哉, Endō Moriya).
- Subterranean Monster Mogedon (地底怪獣 モゲドン, Chitei Kaijū Mogedon; 48): A mole-like monster who accidentally swallowed the Ndamoshite X bomb, causing it to run rampant until Super GUTS sedated it with a tranquilizer. Musashi/Chadabin and Hayate volunteered to walk into the monster's throat to disarm the bomb, followed by Dyna relocating the monster to somewhere else after acknowledging the monster as a victim.
