= List of Ultraman Trigger: New Generation Tiga episodes =

Ultraman Trigger: New Generation Tiga is a Japanese tokusatsu drama series produced by Tsuburaya Productions. As the 33rd entry to the Ultra Series, the show presents itself as a modern retelling of Ultraman Tiga, while also celebrating its 25th anniversary.

== Episodes ==
No.	Title	Directed by	Written by	Original release date
0	"Ultraman Trigger Preview Special: Protect the Smiles, the Light of Hope"; Transliteration: "Urutoraman Torigā Chokuzen Supesharu Egao o Mamoru, Kibō no Hikari" (Japanese: 『ウルトラマントリガー』直前スペシャル ～笑顔を守る、希望の光～)	N/A	N/A	July 3, 2021
A special episode set the week before the premier of Ultraman Trigger: New Generation Tiga.
1	"Connection of Light"; Transliteration: "Hikari o Tsunagu Mono" (Japanese: 光を繋ぐもの)	Koichi Sakamoto	Naoki Hayashi	July 10, 2021
Martian settlement Kengo Manaka constantly receiving a strange dream of a mysterious dark giant. While obtaining resources for his botanical study, Kengo trailed his mother to an underground pyramid which was later caught in an attack by an ancient monster Golba. The monster's master, Carmeara, prepares to attack the giant slumbering in the pyramid, but Kengo merges with the statue as Ultraman Trigger, using his newfound strength to fight against the invading forces with Carmeara forcing to use Golba as a sacrificial shield to cover her escape. Knowing full well that Kengo is Ultraman Trigger, as well as having memories of Ultraman Tiga, Sizuma Foundation chairman Mitsukuni decided to induct Kengo into the newly formed GUTS-Select.
2	"Leap to the Future"; Transliteration: "Mirai e no Hishō" (Japanese: 未来への飛翔)	Koichi Sakamoto	Naoki Hayashi	July 17, 2021
At Mitsukuni's behest, Kengo joins the GUTS-Select and embarks in his first mission against Gymaira when the team debuted their GUTS Falcon. Akito immediately discover Kengo's identity as Trigger's host, expressing his envy for not being chosen but eventually decided to lend Kengo a helping hand by delivering the Power Type Hyper Key that allows him to be on par with the second Dark Giant, Darrgon. Although still envious to Kengo, Akito decided to heed Mitsukuni's request to help the former in the future.
3	"The Ultra-Ancient Light and Darkness"; Transliteration: "Chō Kodai no Hikari to Yami" (Japanese: 超古代の光と闇)	Koichi Sakamoto	Naoki Hayashi	July 24, 2021
After Ignis made his attempt at targeting Yuna, Kengo and Akito decided to be his guards. The third dark giant, Hudram, kidnapped Yuna to draw Yuzare out from her but Ignis saved the girl at last minute. Seeing Yuzare responding to any dangers approaching Yuna, Hudram summoned Gazort to do the deed, but Trigger uses Sky Type to defeat the monster while GUTS-Select providing cover for the Ultra. After being forcefully dragged out by his fellow dark giants, Hudram rejoins them in their quest to find the Eternity Core.
4	"For Smiles"; Transliteration: "Egao no Tame ni" (Japanese: 笑顔のために)	Masayoshi Takesue	Toshizo Nemoto	July 31, 2021
GUTS-Select are deployed as escorts in an ancient ruins, where they crosses paths with Ignis. Ignis stole an artifact from the ruins and proceed to steal another artifact in Nursedessei, only for his actions resulted in Oka-Gubila's appearance. As Ultraman Trigger fight against the monster, Akito reclaim the artifact from Ignis to lure Oka-Gubila away from Yuna for Trigger to finish the monster safely.
SP	"The Power to Protect Peace"; Transliteration: "Heiwa o Mamoru Chikara" (Japanese: 平和を守る力)	N/A	N/A	August 7, 2021
The first part of the Deban Channel room, hosted by Deban to showcase defense teams of past Ultraman series.
SP	"Heroes Who Soar Through Space"; Transliteration: "Sora o Kakeru Eiyū" (Japanese: 宇宙を翔る英雄)	N/A	N/A	August 14, 2021
The second part of Deban Channel room, showcasing Ultras in Ultra Galaxy Fight: The Absolute Conspiracy while providing a sneak peek of Trigger's upcoming team-up with Ultraman Z.
5	"Akito's Promise"; Transliteration: "Akito no Yakusoku" (Japanese: アキトの約束)	Masayoshi Takesue	Toshizo Nemoto	August 21, 2021
At Kurara City (クララシティ, Kurara Shiti), Deathdrago appeared for the first time in 6 years to continue its rampaging spree. Akito gets suspended after his desire to avenge his late parents caused him to lose focus during the duty. Deathdrago resurfaces after it was enhanced by Carmeara, forcing Trigger to fight it while Akito defends Yuna from Darrgon's assault. At the end of the fight, Akito had his suspension extended for recuperation reasons by captain Tatsumi.
6	"The One Hour Demon"; Transliteration: "Ichi-jikan no Akuma" (Japanese: 一時間の悪魔)	Masayoshi Takesue	Toshizo Nemoto	August 28, 2021
Despite their combined efforts, Trigger and GUTS-Select are defeated by a modified Gigadelos whom they name "Satandelos", who is protected by a powerful energy barrier that uses most of its energy, making of him only able to fight for one hour per day. The team looks for a way to deactivate the barrier, when Ignis appears to offer them some help by attacking the robot's vulnerable part. When Hudram appears to join the fight, Trigger fought against the dark giant while GUTS-Select destroyed the robot on their own. Near the end of the episode, Ignis' offer for help was due to his vendetta against Hudram for destroying Lishuria, vowing to seek a stronger power to confront his long time opponent.
7	"Inter Universe"; Transliteration: "Intā Yunibāsu" (Japanese: インター・ユニバース)	Kiyotaka Taguchi	Keigo Koyanagi	September 4, 2021
One day, GUTS-Select encountered King Joe STORAGE Custom that fell from the sky. Their investigation leads them to ex-STORAGE member Haruki Natsukawa, who arrived on their world during a chase against Alien Barossa IV to recover the stolen SAA machine. With Haruki's Z Riser damaged and his Ultra Medals stolen, Akito gave him another transformable GUTS Sparklence and a Hyper Key to transform into Z's Original form, using it to support Ultraman Trigger in the fight against Alien Barossa IV, with Beliarok joined late in the battle. After the fight ended, Ignis returned the Ultra Medals to Haruki after stealing them from the alien pirate.
8	"The Propagating Invasion"; Transliteration: "Hanshoku Suru Shinryaku" (Japanese: 繁殖する侵略)	Kiyotaka Taguchi	Keigo Koyanagi	September 11, 2021
Dispersed from the outer sky as Dada Factors, they materialized as Dada (PDO-3), digital lifeforms bent on conquering the Earth through global-scale cyberattack. The Dada targeted GUTS-Select's Nursedessei in the midst of the chaos, forcing the team to resort to analog controls and manually removing the alien influence on their own. Dada would later resort to possess King Joe STORAGE Custom as their reinforcement in against Ultraman Trigger and Z, forcing them to scrap the robot after the alien's nucleus was destroyed. Haruki decided to return to his world to take the remains of King Joe for repairs, leaving his still-damaged Z Riser to be repaired in Akito's hands.
9	"The Wings of That Day"; Transliteration: "Ano Hi no Tsubasa" (Japanese: あの日の翼)	Takanori Tsujimoto	Sotaro Hayashi	September 18, 2021
Chairman Mitsukuni returns as its Yuna's 18th birthday, and announces the discovery of multiple ruins which could provide more insight into the Ultra-Ancients. He then takes Yuna away on a trip to a secret cave, which is the hiding place of the GUTS Wing. Whilst Seiya briefs everyone else, Mitsukuni reveals to Yuna that he is another dimension where he was a TPC investigation officer from the Neo Frontier universe. 30 years ago, his GUTS Wing was accidentally pulled into a space-time vortex and he became lost in this dimension where he married Yurika and they established Sizuma Foundation. They are interrupted by a monster attack, so whilst Akito leads Yuna away, Mitsukuni remote pilots the GUTS Wing, which became the prototype for the GUTS Falcon, and assists Trigger in defeating the monster. When they return to Nursedessei, Yuna is given a surprise birthday party, where the others are dumbstruck when a clueless Akito gives Yuna a taser as a present.
10	"Wavering Heart"; Transliteration: "Yureru Kokoro" (Japanese: 揺れるココロ)	Takanori Tsujimoto	Sotaro Hayashi	September 25, 2021
Darrgon slowly starts to realize his feelings for Yuna after standing up to him in their previous fight. While attempting to confess to her through a poor advise from Ignis, Kengo and Akito came to her aid after mistaking his advances for a threat, inadvertently causing Zaragas to appear out of Darrgon's temper tantrum. While Trigger fought against the monster, Darrgon saved Yuna and Akito from being trampled while Trigger finished it. Darrgon eventually decided to leave Yuna alone and took the lesson of mankind getting stronger through the power of love to heart. Meanwhile, Akito discovered the last piece of the tablet revealing that the Giants of Darkness have a fourth member, who is revealed to be none other than Ultraman Trigger.
11	"The Encounter of Light and Darkness"; Transliteration: "Hikari to Yami no Kaikō" (Japanese: 光と闇の邂逅)	Masayoshi Takesue	Naoki Hayashi	October 2, 2021
Carmeara engulfs Trigger with darkness in order to make him return to her side, when Kengo gets transported back in time to the Ultra Ancient era, where he meets Yuzare and attempts to protect her from the Giants of Darkness, Trigger Dark included, but fails. Using Yuzare as a key, the Giants of Darkness gain access to the Eternity Core, but just when Trigger Dark is about to claim it, Kengo intervenes and brings them into the inner space. Back to the present, Trigger reverts into Trigger Dark, much to the disbelief of Akito and the others, while Kengo confronts Trigger Dark within him.
12	"The 30-Million-Year Miracle"; Transliteration: "Sanzenman-nen no Kiseki" (Japanese: 三千万年の奇跡)	Masayoshi Takesue	Naoki Hayashi	October 9, 2021
Kengo confronts Trigger Dark and learn that his past self was all this time inside it, while Akito reveals to Yuna that Kengo is Ultraman Trigger. Back to the Ultra Ancient Era, Yuzare uses the last of her strength to power up Kengo who defeats the other Giants of Darkness, before being sealed within Ultraman Trigger in Mars. Having fused again with his past self, Kengo returns to his friends' side and battles Trigger Dark as Ultraman Trigger. Carmeara and the others intervene, but Trigger Dark attacks friend and foe, until Yuzare gives Yuna a fragment of the Eternity Core, which she uses to give Kengo the Glitter Trigger Eternity Key, using it to transform into Ultraman Glitter Trigger Eternity and destroy Trigger Dark. Kengo reunites with Yuna and Akito and the three rejoice, unaware that Ignis has absorbed the remains of Trigger Dark into himself.
13	"The Marked Captain: Detective Marluru's Case File"; Transliteration: "Nerawareta Taichō Marwuru Tantei no Jiken-bo" (Japanese: 狙われた隊長 ～マルゥル探偵の事件簿～)	Naoyuki Uchida	Junichiro Ashiki	October 16, 2021
With the GUTS-Select team unable to contact Captain Tatsumi, Marluru finds a trace of what seems to be blood and presuming to be his, begins their own investigation to look for his whereabouts. Meanwhile, with Yuna now aware of his secret identity, Kengo tells her all the truth including what happened to him since he became Ultraman Trigger, including his findings during his travel to the past. Marluru's findings make them believe that Tatsumi was killed, until the Captain himself appears before them unharmed, proving that they just jumped to conclusions, while Ignis sneaks aboard the Nursedessei and steals some of their technology for his own personal agenda.
14	"The Golden Threat"; Transliteration: "Kogane no Kyōi" (Japanese: 黄金の脅威)	Koichi Sakamoto	Junichiro Ashiki	October 23, 2021
The Absolutians Tartarus and Diavolo appear at Kengo's Earth intending to steal the Eternity Core, using their power to dissuade the giants of darkness from attempting to stop them. They send the monster Darebolic forcing Kengo to transform into Glitter Trigger Eternity to destroy it. Meanwhile, Ignis approaches Akito and provides him with intel on the Absolutians in repayment for the tech he stole. Diavolo appears to challenge Trigger, forcing Kengo to fight him despite being wounded from the last battle and still unable to control the power of the Eternity Core. Trigger is overpowered by Diavolo, but is rescued by Ultraman Ribut. Back at the Nursedessei, Akito completes a new Hyper Key that will allow them to unlock the true power of the battleship.
15	"Operation Dragon"; Transliteration: "Operēshon Doragon" (Japanese: オペレーションドラゴン)	Koichi Sakamoto	Junichiro Ashiki	October 30, 2021
While Kengo has some special training to master the power of the Eternity Core with Ribut and Yuna's help, the rest of GUTS-Select begin their plan to lure Diavolo into a trap and steal his Absolute Particles to power-up the Nursedessei. With an unexpected help from the Giants of Darkness against their common enemy, the team succeeds and unlocks Nursedessei's battle mode, who assists Ribut and Glitter Trigger Eternity into destroying Diavolo. Having learned to control his new powers, Kengo bids farewell to Ribut, thanking him for his help, while Diavolo revives by the power of his Absolute Heart. Tartarus and Diavolo depart from Earth to move on with their agenda and Ignis successfully infuses his GUTS Sparklence and Hyper Key with Trigger Dark's powers to transform into the dark Ultra.
16	"Sneering Destruction"; Transliteration: "Warau Metsubō" (Japanese: 嗤う滅亡)	Tomonobu Koshi	Sumio Uetake	November 6, 2021
Ignis, transformed into Trigger Dark, loses control of his powers and has a short fight with Trigger before fleeing. From the debris of their battle, a seed-shaped sphere is revealed. While Akito investigates the sphere with Yuna and Kengo, Ignis attacks Hudram, determined to avenge the destruction of his home planet. However, Hudram activates the sphere, revealing the Infernal Beast Metsu-Orga who attacks Trigger Dark. Trigger and GUTS-Select intervene, but Metsu-Orga absorbs the energy of their attacks and evolves into the much stronger Metsu-Orochi who easily defeats both Triggers. Out of options, Captain Tatsumi declares that they will use the Gargorgon Key as a last resort against the Infernal Beast.
17	"Raging Feast"; Transliteration: "Ikaru Kyōen" (Japanese: 怒る饗宴)	Tomonobu Koshi	Sumio Uetake	November 13, 2021
Using the Gargorgon Key as ammunition, the Nursedessei fires its main cannon against Metsu-Orochi, temporarily petrifying the monster, but also rendering its weapon system useless. While the monster recovers, GUTS-Select assemble an army using conventional weapons as energy weapons only make it stronger. When Metsu-Orochi starts moving again, the team's efforts to destroy the monster's horn and preventing it from absorbing more energy are hindered when Ignis, disturbed by his memories of the past, attacks Metsu-Orochi as Trigger Dark, until Kengo, piloting the GUTS Falcon, destroys the horn. As Glitter Trigger Eternity, Kengo destroys Metsu-Orochi but Carmeara attacks him in sequence, seeking revenge on Kengo for making Trigger Dark leave her side. Using Trigger's Circle Arms, Trigger Dark wounds Carmeara and Darrgon convinces her to retreat. After the battle, Ignis is arrested once Akito realizes that he is Trigger Dark and confiscates the GUTS Sparklence and Hyper Keys in his possession.
18	"Smile Operation No.1"; Transliteration: "Sumairu Sakusen Dai Ichi-gō" (Japanese: スマイル作戦第一号)	Kiyotaka Taguchi	Toshizo Nemoto	November 20, 2021
Captain Seiya Tatsumi receives a promotion into the captain of GUTS-Select Asia branch, and a lot of good things happen to the rest of GUTS-Select members. Another Golba appears on Earth, but it was not the work of the Giants of Darkness as it fought against Trigger while GUTS-Select members become disoriented. Yuna reveals that all good things happen to them, including Tatsumi's "promotion", are simply hallucinations while Trigger managed to destroy the monster with Glitter Trigger Eternity.
19	"What Makes a Savior"; Transliteration: "Kyūseishu no Shikaku" (Japanese: 救世主の資格)	Kiyotaka Taguchi	Toshizo Nemoto	November 27, 2021
Mitsukuni arrives at Nursedessei to reveal that the trance affecting them was Morpheus R, making sure to check on them after their previous actions in against Golba II. The Giants of Darkness are still under the trance and Carmeara and Hudram begins fighting against one another, forcing Kengo to interfere as Trigger. Meanwhile Yuna encounters a mysterious man who claims to be the source of those Morpheus R wave, doing so to test potential savior of mankind and find it in the form of Yuna as she was able to resist said influence. The Giants of Darkness retreat once affirming that Yuzare's awakening is at full potential and the mysterious man transforms into Kyrieloid to fight against Trigger. Mitsukuni recognizes the villain due to his tenure on his previous dimension, with bits of Tiga's light was revealed to be in his body all along, allowing Yuna/Yuzare to manifest Ultraman Tiga in real life to assist Trigger in against the other dimension invader.
SP	"Blooming Flowers of Evil"; Transliteration: "Sakimidareru Aku no Hana" (Japanese: 咲き乱れる悪の華)	N/A	N/A	December 4, 2021
The third episode of Deban Channel that focuses on reviewing adversaries of past Ultra Warriors.
20	"The Blue One Comes With the Lightning"; Transliteration: "Aoi Aitsu wa Raigeki to Tomo ni" (Japanese: 青いアイツは雷撃と共に)	Takanori Tsujimoto	Jun Tsugita	December 11, 2021
Hudram recruits the alien Barriguiller to kidnap Yuna for him. Meanwhile, Akito reveals to the rest of the team about Yuna's connection to Yuzare and that her powers had just awakened. Barriguiller attacks and demands Yuzare to appear but Trigger fights him instead. Cornered by Trigger, Barriguiller takes Akito hostage but Yuna is forbidden to interfere, until he escapes the Nursedessei with Ignis' help and takes Akito's place. With Yuna as his captive Barriguiller is convinced by her that Hudram is lying and the Giant of Darkness betrays him. Hudram attempts to escape with Yuna but Trigger and Barriguiller join forces to rescue her and force the enemy to flee. Afterwards, Barriguiller apologizes to Yuna for all the trouble he caused and returns to space.
21	"Demons Rampage Again"; Transliteration: "Akuma ga Futatabi" (Japanese: 悪魔がふたたび)	Takanori Tsujimoto	Jun Tsugita	December 18, 2021
During Barriguiller's fight, one of his attacks struck one of the Shizuma Foundation's research facilities, compromising one of their ancient artifacts. To prevent further damage, Kengo and Akito are sent to retrieve the artifact but it breaks, releasing the monster Aboras, who begins spewing a blue foam. Kengo saves Akito from the foam, but is engulfed by it. Aboras begins a rampage which breaks another artifact that releases the monster Banila and the two start fighting. By deciphering an ancient text with Ignis' help, Akito discovers that Banila's flames can neutralize Aboras' foam. Having his GUTS Sparklence and Trigger Dark Hyper Key returned, Ignis transforms into Trigger Dark and rescues Kengo who joins the fight as Glitter Trigger Eternity. The two Ultras destroy the monsters in sync to prevent their remains from polluting the planet, but after the battle, Kengo's celebration with the others are cut short when Ignis suddenly transforms into Trigger Dark and kidnaps Yuna.
22	"Last Game"; Transliteration: "Rasuto Gēmu" (Japanese: ラストゲーム)	Takanori Tsujimoto	Junichiro Ashiki	December 25, 2021
At Nursedessei, the crew finds a record left by Ignis, revealing that he intends to use the Eternity Core to restore his home planet, which may threaten Earth itself, and challenges GUTS-Select to stop him. Meanwhile, Hudram severs ties with Carmeara and Darrgon, intending to take the Eternity Core just for himself. Kengo and Akito chase after Ignis but they stumble on the clockwork warrior, Mecha Musashin and Kengo stays behind as Trigger to fight it. At the site of the Eternity Core, Hudram captures Yuna and uses her as leverage against Ignis, but Akito appears to rescue her. As Trigger Dark, Ignis fights Hudram but is overpowered until Trigger defeats Mecha Musashin with Nursedessei's help and lends the Glitter Eternity Key to Ignis. Trigger Dark defeats Hudram, but Ignis gives up on claiming the Eternity Core for the sake of Kengo and the others and takes his leave, affirming that it's not the time for him to join their side yet. Hudram survives the fight with Ignis, but is killed by Carmeara for his betrayal, his dark energy absorbed into her body.
23	"My Friend"; Transliteration: "Mai Furendo" (Japanese: マイフレンド)	Koichi Sakamoto	Naoki Hayashi	January 8, 2022
Darrgon becomes angry on Carmeara for killing Hudram and decides to also leave her side, but Carmeara uses her enhanced powers to corrupt his mind and send him in a rampage. Trigger fights Darrgon and is overpowered, but the Giant of Darkness regains his senses to rescue Yuna from danger. Having recognized mankind's worth, Darrgon asks Kengo for an honorable duel, to which he accepts. However, their fight is interrupted when Carmeara regains control over Darrgon, who asks for Akito to mercy kill him in order to protect Yuna. Akito follows Darrgon's request, using the Nursessei empowered by the Ultraman Ribut Key to destroy him, but Carmeara becomes even stronger by absorbing Darrgon's energy and defeats Trigger while kidnapping Yuna, using her as a key to the location of the Eternity Core. Upon touching the Eternity Core, Carmeara corrupts it and transforms into the Evil God Megalothor.
24	"The Ruler of Shadows"; Transliteration: "Yami no Shihaisha" (Japanese: 闇の支配者)	Koichi Sakamoto	Naoki Hayashi	January 15, 2022
Corrupted by Carmeara's darkness, the Eternity Core becomes unstable and at risk of destroying not only Earth, but the entire universe. Trigger fights Megalothor, but is overpowered by the monster. Yuna decides to sacrifice herself just like Yuzare did in order to stop Megalothor, but Akito stops her. Ignis and Nursedessei arrive to assist Kengo and by combining their powers, Trigger and Trigger Dark defeat Megalothor, but the monster's massive dark energy pushes them away, forcing GUTS-Select to retreat by Mitsukuni's orders. Three days later, while Kengo recuperates, he has an encounter with his mother in Mars by astral projection and learns that he is adopted, raised by Reina after she rescued him from the remains of Trigger as a baby. Having recovered and evolved further, Megalothor appears to attack the GUTS-Select base and Kengo warns the others that Carmeara is after him, while revealing his identity as Trigger to the rest of the team. To protect the world from Carmeara's wrath, Kengo and Ignis transform into Trigger and Trigger Dark to fight Megalothor.
25	"To the Ones Who Believe in Smiles: Pull the Trigger"; Transliteration: "Egao o Shinjiru Mono-tachi e Puru Za Torigā" (Japanese: 笑顔を信じるものたちへ ～PULL THE TRIGGER～)	Koichi Sakamoto	Naoki Hayashi	January 22, 2022
With Megalothor unfazed by Trigger and Trigger Dark's attacks, Kengo attempts to tap directly into the energy of the Eternity Core to defeat the monster, but fails. After retreating, Kengo realizes that only by balancing the light and dark in Ultraman Trigger he can properly control the Eternity Core's energy and Akito comes with a plan to have Yuna gather the energy of the Eternity Core for Trigger, but using the Nursedessei as a medium to prevent it from destroying her body. With Ignis' help, Kengo infuses both Trigger and Trigger Dark's powers into one single key, that allows him to transform into Trigger Truth. Realizing their plan, Carmeara uses her darkness to send clones of Hudram and Dargon to attack the Nursedessei, with Kengo's friends fighting the invaders to protect Yuna. Trigger Truth is overpowered by Megalothor until the children watching the battle on TV send their energies to him to make him stronger, and he combines his powers with the Nurse Cannon to destroy Megalothor and Carmeara for good. Before Carmeara's spirit vanishes, Kengo finally manages to reason with her, and she finds some peace as she fades away. However, the Eternity Core remains unstable and to stabilize it again, Kengo must merge with it, returning Trigger Dark's power to Ignis and bidding farewell to his friends. Before leaving, R'lyeh finally blooms and he promises to one day return to their side. Ignis returns to space to keep searching for a way to restore his home planet and the members of GUTS-Select continue their daily lives, waiting for Kengo's return.
