= List of Ultraman Decker episodes =

Ultraman Decker is a Japanese tokusatsu drama series produced by Tsuburaya Productions. As the 34th entry to the Ultra Series, the show presents itself as a modern retelling of Ultraman Dyna, while also celebrating its 25th anniversary.

At the end of each episode, a minisode called Kanata's Ultra Dimension Navi (カナタのウルトラディメンションナビ, Kanata no Urutora Dimenshon Nabi) aired and featuring Kanata Asumi describing the Dimension Cards of said episode. HANE2 joined Kanata starting from episode 2 onwards.

== Episodes ==
No.	Title	Directed by	Written by	Original release date
SP	"Ultraman Decker Preview Special"; Transliteration: "Urutoraman Dekkā Chokuzen Supesharu" (Japanese: ウルトラマンデッカー直前スペシャル)	N/A	N/A	July 2, 2022
A brief description of Ultraman Decker before the premiere of the series.
1	"Day of the Attack"; Transliteration: "Shūrai no Hi" (Japanese: 襲来の日)	Masayoshi Takesue	Toshizo Nemoto	July 9, 2022
7 years had passed since Trigger's final fight, the Earth regains peace from the monster attacks. However, the Spheres commence their attack on both the Martian colony and Earth, as well as summoning the Spheresaurus to disable the remote controlled Nursedessei and GUTS Falcon. While bravely joining the frontlines, Kanata gets captured by a Sphere and bonds with Ultraman Decker, using his newfound powers to kill Spheresaurus but fails to stop the Spheres from containing the entire planet. Five days after the incident, Kanata joins TPU once gaining his grandfather's blessing. This episode's segment for Kanata's Ultra Dimension Navi features the Ultra Dimension Card of Ultraman Decker Flash Type.
2	"Kanata's Resolve"; Transliteration: "Ketsui no Kanata" (Japanese: 決意のカナタ)	Masayoshi Takesue	Toshizo Nemoto	July 16, 2022
One year has passed and with Earth still enveloped by the Spheres' barrier, Kanata struggles with his training. During an exercise with fellow cadets Soma Ryumon and Ichika Kirino, Kanata has an accident that injures his leg and Soma decides to call off the exercise, when Deathdrago appears and begins attacking. Kanata transforms into Ultraman Decker to fight back, but he still suffers from his injury, until he is instructed to use a Dimension Card to summon the monster Miclas and destroy Deathdrago with its help. After the battle, captain Taiji Murahoshi notices that Kanata, Soma and Ichika disobeyed orders to evacuate in order to help the injured civilians and recognizing their dedication, promotes them to official members of GUTS-Select, transferring them to Nursedessei where they meet the rest of the team, vice captain Sawa Kaizaki and the robot HANE2, who pilots the new GUTS Hawk aircraft. This episode's segment for Kanata's Ultra Dimension Navi features the Mons Dimension Card of Miclas.
3	"Move Out, GUTS-Select!"; Transliteration: "Shutsudō! Gattsu Serekuto" (Japanese: 出動！ GUTS-SELECT)	Masayoshi Takesue	Toshizo Nemoto	July 23, 2022
Kanata, Ichika and Soma did their simulation training for GUTS Falcon in anticipation of their team up with HANE2, bonding with the AI at the same time. When Gomora surfaces, Kanata is chosen as Falcon's pilot and the Spheres interfere with the battle by assimilating with Gomora into Sphere Gomora. To combat the new threat, Kanata transforms into Decker and accesses Strong Type to destroy it. In aftermath of the battle, HANE2 agrees to keep Kanata's double life as an Ultraman a secret and receives the nickname Hanejiro. This episode's segment for Kanata's Ultra Dimension Navi features the Ultra Dimension Card of Ultraman Decker Strong Type.
4	"The Destructive Monster Awakens"; Transliteration: "Hakai-jū Kakusei" (Japanese: 破壊獣覚醒)	Takanori Tsujimoto	Takao Nakano	July 30, 2022
A strange capsule was discovered by the construction crew while digging the Tochinoki City's Yunohana Hot Spring. When GUTS Select investigates, the capsule releases Mons-Ahgar, a series of civilization destroying monsters whose goal is to prevent mankind's exploration to outer space. While Kanata transforms into Decker to fight the monster, he disables and exposes Mons-Ahgar's weak point, allowing HANE2 to use GUTS Gryphon and strike it from above. This episode's segment for Kanata's Ultra Dimension Navi features the Mons Dimension Card of Mons-Ahgar.
5	"Glutton of the Lake"; Transliteration: "Mizuumi no Kuishinbō" (Japanese: 湖の食いしん坊)	Takanori Tsujimoto	Jun Tsugita	August 6, 2022
While GUTS-Select are dispatched against Eleking, Ichika met Yuko, an Alien Pitt who is the owner of said monster, explaining her background and issues leading to this. Ichika agrees to help her by feeding Eleking, but doing so turns the monster berserk until Decker uses Miracle Type to resolve the issue, eventually regressing Eleking to its larva form. Yuko gets to keep Eleking, doing so under the guidance of Sawa. This episode's segment for Kanata's Ultra Dimension Navi features the Ultra Dimension Card of Ultraman Decker Miracle Type.
SP	"The Return of Marluru"; Transliteration: "Marwuru no Kikan" (Japanese: マルゥルの帰還)	N/A	N/A	August 13, 2022
Marluru returns to Special Section 3, where he reunites with Masamichi Hotta. The two then reminisces the events from Trigger and Decker up to that point, with Marluru accidentally exposing Kengo's dual identity to Hotta. The episode then ends with the two preparing to construct a new project based on a plan given by Asakage.
6	"Subterranean Monster Appears! And Appears!"; Transliteration: "Chitei Kaijū Arawaru! Arawaru!" (Japanese: 地底怪獣現る！現る！)	Takanori Tsujimoto	Takao Nakano	August 20, 2022
Pagos surfaces to attack a factory for its supply of Supercritical and mysteriously seen able to burrow underground faster than usual. When GUTS-Select members track the monster's main point and Ultraman Decker appearing to support them, it was revealed that Pagos conspired with Gudon and the two drag the Ultra to their underground habitat, further uneven the odds with appearances from Telesdon and Twintails. After Telesdon, Twintails and Pagos are killed, Decker brings Gudon airborne and destroys the monster. This episode's segment for Kanata's Ultra Dimension Navi features the Mons Dimension Card of Agira.
7	"The Light of Hope from The Red Planet"; Transliteration: "Kibō no Hikari, Akaki Hoshi yori" (Japanese: 希望の光、赤き星より)	Koichi Sakamoto	Naoki Hayashi	August 27, 2022
By the time Decker fights on Earth, Trigger/Kengo and the rest of former GUTS-Select members are defending the Martian civilization from the Spheres. With the help of Yuzare and Akito, Kengo manages to reach Earth where he meets Kanata and joins forces to fight against Sphere Megalothor, only to hesitate the moment Carmeara reveals to have revived as well. This episode's segment for Kanata's Ultra Dimension Navi features the Ultra Dimension Card of Ultraman Trigger Multi Type.
8	"Light and Darkness, Again"; Transliteration: "Hikari to Yami, Futatabi" (Japanese: 光と闇、ふたたび)	Koichi Sakamoto	Naoki Hayashi	September 3, 2022
Kengo is still ridden with guilt for not being able to save Carmeara a decade prior. At the same time, the Ultra-Ancient Plant R'lyeh spreads its hallucinogenic pollen and begins growing overnight. Yuna and Kengo officially rejoins GUTS-Select to put out the flower, then the two Ultras fight against Megalothor. With Decker and Yuzare's help, Carmeara is successfully rescued and the three destroys Megalothor. Kengo entrusts the Ultra Dual Sword to Kanata and leaves the Earth with Carmeara joining him. This episode's segment for Kanata's Ultra Dimension Navi features the Ultra Dimension Card of Ultraman Trigger Power Type.
9	"Standing Tall for Someone Special"; Transliteration: "Taga Tame no Yūshi" (Japanese: 誰がための勇姿)	Koichi Sakamoto	Aya Satsuki	September 10, 2022
Grace, a former alien fighter who retires due to his ailing health, returns to defend the city from a Red King. GUTS-Select is willing to honor is wish for a final fight, which coincides with their ongoing test with GUTS Gryphon's new weapon. On the day of their battle, the Red King returns as a Sphere-infected monster, forcing Gregore to forfeit the match to assist Decker and ended with GUTS Gryphon firing the experimental weapon. Gregore survives nonetheless and is treated under TPU's care, while Asakage uses the feedback data for the upcoming DG001. This episode's segment for Kanata's Ultra Dimension Navi features the Mons Dimension Card of Windom.
10	"Man and Monster"; Transliteration: "Hito to Kaijū" (Japanese: 人と怪獣)	Tomonobu Koshi	Toshizo Nemoto	September 17, 2022
The monster named Neomegas appears twice to defeat the rampaging Sadola and King Guesra before it disappears. Vice captain Sawa traced the monster's roots to her former professor, Maki Shigenaga, who creates Neomegas as a form of bioweapon against recurring monster attacks. After Neomegas turned berserk and destroyed by Decker, Shigenaga is arrested by Decker, with remnants of its cells cleaned up to prevent the monster from being recreated via cloning while her sponsors are arrested. This episode's segment for Kanata's Ultra Dimension Navi features the Ultra Dimension Card of Ultraman Trigger Sky Type.
11	"Machine God Deployed"; Transliteration: "Kijin Shutsugeki" (Japanese: 機神出撃)	Tomonobu Koshi	Junichiro Ashiki	September 24, 2022
On the day of testing Terraphaser, the robot was attacked midway in its delivery by Gazort but manages to arrive at the destinated testing site unharmed. Unfortunately moments later, it gets targeted by Raibasser and its smaller flock of Hinabasser, all of them ostensibly out of fear for the robot's sheer strength. With its original AI being fried beyond repair, GUTS-Select and Asakage concocts a plan to get HANE2 to pilot it, getting assistance from a human-sized Ultraman Decker along the way. The robot is then reactivated and uses its set of arsenals to overpower Raibasser before HANE2 overheated, paving way for the Ultra to finish the bird monster on his own.
12	"Neomegas Strikes Back"; Transliteration: "Neomegasu no Gyakushū" (Japanese: ネオメガスの逆襲)	Tomonobu Koshi	Junichiro Ashiki	October 1, 2022
A leftover spike from Neomegas is salvaged by the Spheres to resurrect the monster under their thrall. Sphere-Neomegas made a quick work against Ultraman Decker and TPU forces while pumping the ground beneath it with its own energy overnight. The next day, HANE2 proposes a plan for GUTS-Select and TPU forces to attack the Sphere Soldiers head on while he pilots Terraphaser and join forces with Ultraman Decker to repel Sphere-Neomegas' attacks, successfully blowing up the monster with TR Mega Buster. After the battle, Asakage gets a hold of HANE2's combat data and discovers Kanata's identity as Ultraman Decker. This episode's segment for Kanata's Ultra Dimension Navi features the Mons Dimension Card of Sphere Neomegas.
13	"Jumble Rock"; Transliteration: "Janburu Rokku" (Japanese: ジャンブル・ロック)	Naoyuki Uchida	Yukinobu Tsuruta	October 8, 2022
Former GUTS-Select member Marluru visited the Nursedessei for repairs while admonishing the rookies of the new GUTS-Select members for their shortcomings. While fixing alongside Kanata, Marluru pieces together of his identity as Decker's host but is trapped in the maintenance room after the fire extinguishers were activated by mistake. Ryumon and Ichika work together to free the two from the room, hence renewing Marluru's respect for the rookies while agreeing to keep Kanata's identity of Ultraman Decker as a secret.
14	"Birth of a Dark God"; Transliteration: "Majin Tanjō" (Japanese: 魔神誕生)	Masayoshi Takesue	Toshizo Nemoto	October 15, 2022
With Terraphaser's help, monster attacks had become simpler for GUTS-Select and Ultraman Decker to handle against. Spheresaurus returns, now absorbing Sphere-Neomegas' buried energy to empower itself. While fighting against the monster, Asakage went rogue and hijacks the Terraphaser to fight against Decker while intending to assist the Spheres in devouring Planet Earth. He was stopped midway by a mysterious man, who took the baton of Ultraman Decker from Kanata and fought Terraphaser by ending the fight in a stalemate. This episode's segment for Kanata's Ultra Dimension Navi features the Mons Dimension Card of Spheresaurus.
15	"A Promise for Tomorrow"; Transliteration: "Asu e no Yakusoku" (Japanese: 明日への約束)	Masayoshi Takesue	Toshizo Nemoto	October 22, 2022
The mysterious man reveals himself as the true owner of Ultraman Decker's powers and that he hails from the future where the Spheres also came from, having fight their threats with the alliances from a united alien civilizations, Yuzare and Ultraman Dyna. When Planet Bazdor gets invaded, Agams defected to the Spheres and jumps into Earth's distant past where he disguises himself as "Asakage" while unleashing the Spheres earlier than the intended time. Kanata however decides to take it to himself in defending Earth from both the Spheres and Agams, eventually granting Decker the Dynamic Type to destroy both Spheresaurus and Terraphaser. Confident that Earth's safety is in Kanata's hands, the mysterious man returns to the future, but not before revealing himself as Decker Asumi, Kanata's descendant. This episode's segment for Kanata's Ultra Dimension Navi features the Ultra Dimension Card of Ultraman Decker Dynamic Type.
16	"Stay as You Are"; Transliteration: "Kimi wa Kimi no Mama de" (Japanese: 君は君のままで)	Kazuhiro Nakagawa	Aya Satsuki	October 29, 2022
Kanata is still shaken by Agams' betrayal and how he blames humankind for the Spheres' invasion on Planet Bazdo. It gets to the point where he jeopardized GUTS-Select's attempt at capturing Spinnie, a chick monster that eventually grows into Pandon. After the monster's destruction, captain Murahoshi gets called into investigation by TPU for his relation to Asakage.
17	"Investigation from the Past"; Transliteration: "Kako yori no Shirabe" (Japanese: 過去よりの調べ)	Kazuhiro Nakagawa	Jun Tsugita	November 5, 2022
Alien Metron Nigel, the director of TPU's internal affairs puts Murahoshi under suspension due to his close relation to "Asakage", as well as his absence during Metsu-Orochi's rampage to help a child, the latter's disappearance puts him under suspicion. Ryumon connected the dots of this incident and finally exonerates his captain after revealing himself as the lost child from said monster attack. This allows GUTS-Select to catch up with Gomess (S)'s rampage when Nigel underestimated the monster's might, with Decker providing support despite Kanata's arm injury from an earlier fight with Pandon. With both cases solved, Nigel acknowledges GUTS-Select's efficiency and apologizes to them before leaving with the rest of the internal affairs officers. This episode's segment for Kanata's Ultra Dimension Navi features the Mons Dimension Card of Hudram.
SP	"The Threat of the Terraphaser"; Transliteration: "Terafeizā no Kyōi" (Japanese: テラフェイザーの脅威)	N/A	N/A	November 12, 2022
Special Section 3 members, Marluru and Hotta discusses the events that transpires from Terraphaser's creation, Agams' defection and lastly comparisons of robot mechas.
18	"Invitation from Another Dimension"; Transliteration: "Ijigen kara no Izanai" (Japanese: 異次元からのいざない)	Koichi Sakamoto	Naoki Hayashi	November 19, 2022
Agams cooperated with Yapool through their mutual hatred against Kanata/Ultraman Decker. After failing to kill the young members of GUTS-Select, Yapool deploys Aribunta against Decker while Agams joins the fray as Terraphaser. After Terraphaser's second destruction, Yapool takes advantage of Kanata's inability to hurt Agams into banishing Decker away from Earth. This episode's segment for Kanata's Ultra Dimension Navi features the Mons Dimension Card of Sphere.
19	"Warriors on the Moon"; Transliteration: "Getsumen no Senshi-tachi" (Japanese: 月面の戦士たち)	Koichi Sakamoto	Naoki Hayashi	November 26, 2022
Decker escapes from Yapool's dimension and finds himself outside of Earth, reuniting with Kengo/Trigger as they infiltrate the TPU Moon Base that has turned into a Sphere nest. Fighting against Yapool and the reactivated security robots along the way, Kengo and the alien had their memories probed by the Spheres. Decker rescues Kengo for the two Ultras to kill Yapool and finally defeating the Sphere-possessed Galactron MK2. Decker returns to Earth through Trigger's Sphere Dimension Card, where Kanata reaches the Nursedessei before HANE2's cover-up gets foiled by his teammates. This episode's segment for Kanata's Ultra Dimension Navi features the Ultra Dimension Card of Ultraman Trigger Glitter Trigger Eternity.
20	"Lord Ragon"; Transliteration: "Ragon-sama" (Japanese: らごんさま)	Kiyotaka Taguchi	Takao Nakano	December 3, 2022
At the Wadatsumi Village, GUTS-Select members came to investigate the attacks on developers from Ragon's presence. Ichika's investigation leads to the perpetrator being the local historian Nagi Urasawa, who wishes to prevent the Ama Arch's destruction from land development. The actual Ragon then appears to wreak havoc when its name became forgotten and was quelled of its anger by Nagi, who contemplates to follow the creature along until she was stopped by Ichika and Ultraman Decker, finally making peace with her past.
21	"The Price of Prosperity"; Transliteration: "Han'ei no Daishō" (Japanese: 繁栄の代償)	Kiyotaka Taguchi	Junichiro Ashiki	December 10, 2022
An experimentation with a Sphere essence goes wrong when the creature assimilates with the power generator it was held captive, transforming into Sphere-Geomos and brings the Spheresaurus from the future to restart the Sphere's plot to assimilate Earth. After the Spheresaurus death, Sphere-Geomos' attempt at bringing another monster from the future went awry after Dyna emerges instead, who proceeds to fight the monster and Agams/Terraphaser. Kanata joins the fray as Decker once he cleared out his mind, furthered with Agams' retreat and for both Ultras to destroy the Sphere Synthetic Monster. Before returning to the future, Dyna reassures Kanata that mankind's future isn't set in stones, regardless of what Agams told him. This episode's segment for Kanata's Ultra Dimension Navi features the Ultra Dimension Card of Ultraman Dyna Flash Type.
22	"The Fall of Bazdo"; Transliteration: "Suibō no Bazudo" (Japanese: 衰亡のバズド)	Takanori Tsujimoto	Junichiro Ashiki	December 17, 2022
Agams break the silence of his past towards GUTS-Select, revealing that his motif of arrival to the present day is to enact revenge on mankind for his wife's death in the Sphere's attack by having the Earth destroyed before its people can progress to outer space. Having escaped captivity through Chandlar, Agams empowers Terraphaser through the Spheres' assimilation and finally getting his own robot destroyed in a rematch against Decker. Kanata's identity is exposed to Ryumon, while Agams become amnesiac in return. This episode's segment for Kanata's Ultra Dimension Navi features the Ultra Dimension Card of Ultraman Tiga Multi Type.
23	"The Sky of Despair"; Transliteration: "Zetsubō no Sora" (Japanese: 絶望の空)	Takanori Tsujimoto	Toshizo Nemoto	December 24, 2022
An amnesiac Agams is held captive under TPU's observation and questioned by Kanata, who reveals that the Sphere prepares to summon their progenitor, Mother Spheresaurus to complete the assimilation process once the Sphere Barrier shrinks. Agams then escapes after regaining his memories, who then proceeds to use Terraphaser in erecting Sphere Obelisks in empowering the Sphere Barrier. Despite Decker's intervention, he was defeated by the robot once barely managed to get through the resurrected Sphere Synthetic Monster. Meanwhile, the Mother Spheresaurus prepares to approach Earth and confronts Glitter Trigger Eternity. This episode's segment for Kanata's Ultra Dimension Navi features the Mons Dimension Card of Mother Spheresaurus.
SP	"Stand Up, Decker"; Transliteration: "Tachiagare Dekkā" (Japanese: 立ち上がれデッカー)	N/A	N/A	January 7, 2023
As chaos unfolds with the Spheres engaging their final assault, the Special Section 3 tries to summarize all of Decker's exploits and the climactic battle between Trigger and Megalotohor from Ultraman Trigger.
24	"End of a Dream"; Transliteration: "Yume no Hate" (Japanese: 夢の果て)	Masayoshi Takesue	Toshizo Nemoto	January 14, 2023
GUTS-Select launches an attack against the Sphere Obelisks while Kanata/Decker tries to get through Terraphaser. Agams remains adamant in allowing Earth to be destroyed, but Laelia's spirit snaps him back to his senses and eventually freeing the Earth from the Sphere Barrier. Unfortunately, Mother Spheresaurus arrived to absorb the Eternity Core and fought both Ultras to submission. Agams sacrificed himself to shield Kanata from the monster's attack.
25	"The Light Far Beyond"; Transliteration: "Kanata no Hikari" (Japanese: 彼方の光)	Masayoshi Takesue	Toshizo Nemoto	January 21, 2023
With Kanata slowly assimilated by the Spheres, GUTS-Select salvages the Terraphaser back to their side and Agams' Phase Riser, which he used to provide them with Mother Spheresaurus' weakness. Together with Kengo, GUTS-Select formulates an attack formation by having Trigger draining Mother Spheresaurus from Eternity Core's energy and empowering Decker with it. Just as the monster try to assimilate humankind into her will, GUTS-Select breaks through it and Decker finishes Mother Spheresaurus, at the same time purging the Spheres from Earth. The Martian residents return to Earth while Kanata parted ways with Ultraman Decker.
