= Space Mafia =

Space Mafia may refer to:

- Space Mafia, a faction in the Metal Hero Series installment Blue SWAT
- Working name for Among Us, a 2018 social deduction video game
