= Mariya Yamada =

Japanese actress and a gravure idol (born 1980)

Mariya Yamada 山田 まりや
- Born: March 5, 1980 (age 46); Nagoya
- Occupations: actress, gravure idol
- Years active: 1996 - present
- Spouse: Tōru Kusano (m. 2008; div. 2026)
- Children: 1

Mariya Yamada (山田 まりや, Yamada Mariya; born March 5, 1980) is a Japanese actress and a gravure idol. She won the title of "Miss Young Magazine" in 1996.

== Personal life ==
She has been married to actor Tōru Kusano since March 5, 2008. On December 29, 2012, she gave birth to a son. The couple divorced in 2026 after five years of separation.

== Filmography ==
=== Television ===
- Moon Spiral (NTV / 1996) - Chihiro Yatsumata
- Ultraman Dyna (Tsuburaya Productions / 1997-1998) - Mai Midorikawa
- Naniwa Shōnen Tanteidan (NHK / 2000) - Shinobu Takeuchi
- Ranpo R (YTV / 2004) - ep.5
- Seven Female Lawyers 2 (TV Asahi / 2008)

=== Movies ===
- Ultraman Tiga & Ultraman Dyna | Urutoraman Tiga & Urutoraman Daina: Hikari no hoshi no senshi tachi (1998) - Super GUTS Member Mai Midorikawa
- Ultraman Tiga: The Final Odyssey (1999) - Mai Midorikawa (cameo)
- Ultraman Mebius & Ultraman Brothers (2006)- journalist

=== TV movies ===
- The Files of Young Kindaichi: Murder on the Magic Express (NTV / 2001)
- Gate of Flesh | Nikutai no Mon (TV Asahi / 2008)
