= Ultraman Neos =

- Logo
- Genre: Tokusatsu; Kaiju; Superhero; Science fiction Kyodai Hero
- Created by: Tsuburaya Productions
- Developed by: Koichi Takano (pilot); Junki Takegami (eps 1-12)
- Directed by: Koichi Takano (pilot); Shinichi Kamizawa (eps 1-12)
- Starring: Jun Takatsuki; Kyusaku Shimada; Shigeki Kagemaru; Taketora Morita; Atsuko Rukawa; Mika Sakamoto
- Composer: Toru Fuyuki
- Country of origin: Japan
- Original language: Japanese
- No. of episodes: 12

Production
- Producers: Masahiro Tsuburaya; Hiroshi Kinki
- Production company: Tsuburaya Productions

Original release
- Release: November 22, 2000 – May 5, 2001

Related
- Ultraman Gaia; Ultraman Cosmos

Ultraman Neos (ウルトラマンネオス, Urutoraman Neosu) is a Japanese tokusatsu series, being the eleventh entry (fifteenth overall) in the Ultra Series. Produced by Tsuburaya Productions, Ultraman Neos was initially intended as a TV series but the project was shelved. Years later, Tsuburaya turned the concept into a 12-episode direct-to-video series. In spite of the appearance of similar designs and a cameo by Zoffy, the series is set in an alternate universe.

Toku premiered the series in the United States with English subtitles on May 1, 2017. On Friday, September 29 the entire series was made available for viewing on Verizon's go90.

== Plot ==
In the first decade of the 21st century, Earth has crossed over the Unbalance Zone once in every 3 million years, which caused various unnatural phenomenon on Earth to occur. Having survived the destruction of a space satellite, Genki Kagura was bonded to Ultraman Neos as they fight against the monster brought to life by the Dark Matter mutations with the assistance of HEART and a fellow Ultra veteran, Ultraseven 21. During that time, Kagura crosses paths with Alien Zamu, a race of extraterrestrial aliens who took refuge on Earth when their planet was ravaged by the effects of Dark Matter. In the final episodes, Mensch Heit tries to exterminate this alien race by sending Grall and threatening the Japanese defense forces for cooperation. With Neos and Seven 21 nearly dying from exhaustion, Esura, the last surviving Alien Zamu sacrificed his life to replenish both Ultras as they defeated the demonic ruler and avenge the extinct alien race. Neos and Seven 21 returned to their home planet as the former separated from Kagura and HEART vowing to restore the Zamu race.

== Episodes ==
1. Neos Is Born (ネオス誕生, Neosu Tanjō)
2. The Mysterious Dark Matter (謎のダークマター, Nazo no Dāku Matā)
3. SOS from the Sea (海からのSOS, Umi kara no Esu Ō Esu)
4. The Red Giant! Seven 21 (赤い巨人! セブン21, Akai Kyojin! Sebun Tsū Wan)
5. The Invisible Bond (見えない絆, Mienai Kizuna)
6. Revenge of Alien Zamu (ザム星人の復讐, Zamu Seijin no Fukushū)
7. King of the Ecosystem (生態系の王, Seitaikei no Ō)
8. Revive Earth - HEART to the South (蘇る地球 HEART南へ!, Yomigaeru Chikyū Hāto Minami e!)
9. Our Dino-Coaster (僕らの恐竜コースター, Bokura no Kyōryū Kōsutā)
10. Decide! SX Rescue Operation (決断せよ! SX救出作戦, Ketsudan Seyo! Esu Ekkusu Kyūshutsu Sakusen)
11. The Assassin from Space (宇宙からの暗殺獣, Uchū kara no Ansatsu-jū)
12. The Warriors of Light Forever (光の戦士よ永遠(とわ)に, Hikari no Senshi yo Towa ni)

== Cast ==
- Genki Kagura (カグラ・ゲンキ, Kagura Genki): Jun Takatsuki (高槻 純, Takatsuki Jun)
- Gonpachi Minato (ミナト・ゴンパチ, Minato Gonpachi): Kyusaku Shimada (嶋田 久作, Shimada Kyūsaku)
- Hironobu Uematsu (ウエマツ・ヒロノブ, Uematsu Hironobu): Shigeki Kagemaru (影丸 茂樹, Kagemaru Shigeki)
- Takayoshi Hino (ヒノ・タカヨシ, Hino Takayoshi): Taketora Morita (森田 猛虎, Morita Taketora)
- Nana Hayami (ハヤミ・ナナ, Hayami Nana): Atsuko Rukawa (瑠川 あつこ, Rukawa Atsuko)
- Ayumi Kitabayashi (キタバヤシ・アユミ, Kitabayashi Ayumi): Mika Sakamoto (坂本 三佳, Sakamoto Mika)
- Yōko Fujiwara (フジワラ・ヨウコ, Fujiwara Yōko): Satomi Murakami (村上 聡美, Murakami Satomi)
- Kisaragi (キサラギ): Sakae Kimura (木村 栄, Kimura Sakae)
- Katagiri (カタギリ): Wataru Shihōdō (四方堂 亘, Shihōdō Wataru)

=== Voice cast ===
- Ultraseven 21 (ウルトラセブン21, Urutorasebun Tsū Wan): Isshin Chiba (千葉 一伸, Chiba Isshin)
- Zoffy (ゾフィー, Zofī), Skinhead leader (12): Akitoshi Ōtaki (大滝 明利, Ōtaki Akitoshi)
- Narrator: Ikuya Sawaki (沢木 郁也, Sawaki Ikuya)

=== Guest Cast ===
- Shinya Kenmochi (剣持 慎也, Kenmochi Shin'ya; 4): Kunio Masaoka (正岡 邦夫, Masaoka Kunio)
- Erika Shibata (柴田 エリカ, Shibata Erika; 4): Kaoru Ukawa (鵜川 薫, Ukawa Kaoru)
- Sean Uncle (ショーン・アンクル, Shōn Ankuru; 6): Earl Scott (アール・スコット, Āru Sukotto)
- Jō Naruse (成瀬 丈, Naruse Jō; 7): Hiroshi Miyasaka (宮坂 ひろし, Miyasaka Hiroshi)
- Masato Usami (宇佐美 将人, Usami Masato; 8): Uketa Take (タケ・ウケタ, Take Uketa)
- Mensch Heit (メンシュハイト, Menshu Haito; 11–12): Mister Chin (ミスターちん, Misutā Chin)

== Songs ==
Opening song

- "Ultraman Neos"
  - Lyrics: Gorō Matsui (松井 五郎, Matsui Gorō)
  - Composition: Kisaburō Suzuki (鈴木 キサブロー, Suzuki Kisaburō)
  - Arrangement: Tatsumi Yano (矢野 立美, Yano Tatsumi; 1995), Kazuya Daimon (大門 一也, Daimon Kazuya; TYPE 2001)
  - Artist: Tatsuya Maeda (前田 達也, Maeda Tatsuya; 1995), Project DMM (TYPE 2001)
  - The original version (1995) appeared as an insert song in the 1995 short pilot. For the opening of the 12 episode series, it was labelled as "TYPE 2001" during its marketing in said year.

Ending song

- "IN YOUR HEART"
  - Lyrics: Goro Matsui
  - Composition/Arrangement: Kazuya Daimon
  - Artist: Rica Matsumoto (松本 梨香, Matsumoto Rika) and Project DMM
  - Usually the first verse is played in the entire season, but the second and third is combined and played for the final episode.

Insert song

- "Ultraseven 21"
  - Lyrics: Gorō Matsui
  - Composition: Kisaburō Suzuki
  - Arrangement: Tatsumi Yano (1995), Kazuya Daimon (TYPE 2001)
  - Artist: Tatsuya Maeda (1995), Project DMM (TYPE 2001)
  - The original version (1995) appeared as an insert song in the 1995 short pilot. For the same purpose in episode 4 of the series, it was labelled as "TYPE 2001" due to its marketing in said year.

== Other appearances ==
- Mega Monster Battle: Ultra Galaxy (2009): Neos and Ultraseven 21 fight alongside other residents of the Land of Light against the evil Ultraman Belial.
- State Farm commercial (2014): Neos appeared in a commercial to promote the foreign insurance company.
- Tokyo Brand (2017): Neos made his cameo appearance in a video which promoted tourism to Tokyo, Japan.
- Life of Planet (2017): In a music video performed by Taiwanese band Mayday from their 9th studio album History of Tomorrow, directed by Muh Chen. Neos was seen fighting against Dark Baltan while dealing with humanity's distrust towards him, save for a young boy.
- Ultra Galaxy Fight: The Absolute Conspriacy (2020): Neos and Ultraseven 21 fight alongside other Ultramen of the Land of Light against the evil Absolute Tartarus.

== Home media ==
The series was released in the United States on DVD October 11, 2022 by Mill Creek Entertainment.
