= Yūji Machi =

Japanese voice actor (born 1962)

Yūji Machi 真地 勇志
- Born: August 8, 1962 (age 64); Kawasaki, Kanagawa, Japan
- Occupations: Voice actor, narrator

Yūji Machi (真地 勇志, Machi Yūji; born August 8, 1962 in Kawasaki, Kanagawa) is a Japanese voice actor who is the voice of Ultraman Tiga as well as the voices of Appule and Daizu in Dragon Ball Z. His real name is Shūji Tanabe (田辺 修治, Tanabe Shūji), and he works for Aoni Production.

He is also the Japanese voice of Tommy Oliver in Mighty Morphin Power Rangers: The Movie.

== Filmography ==
=== Television animation ===
- Dragon Quest (1989) (Hargon)
- Dragon Ball Z (1990) (Appule)
- Pretty Soldier Sailor Moon (1992–93) (Kenji Tsukino)
- Anpanman (1994) as Hyōtan-kun
- Grander Musashi (1997) (Takehiro Kazama)
- Seiyu's Life! (2015) (himself)

=== OVA ===
- Legend of the Galactic Heroes (1991) (Drewentz)
- Doomed Megalopolis (1991) (Disciple A)
- Sohryuden: Legend of the Dragon Kings (1993) (Meuron)
- Phantom Quest Corp. (1994) (Sano)

=== Theatrical animation ===
- Dragon Ball Z: The Tree of Might (1990) (Daizu)
- Dragon Quest: The Adventure of Dai (1991) (Soldier)
- Slam Dunk: Conquer the Nation, Hanamichi Sakuragi! (1994) (Tomokazu Godai)
- Detective Conan: The Lost Ship in the Sky (2010) (Masaki Mizukawa)

=== Video games ===
- Street Fighter EX3 (2000) (Ace)
- Dragon Ball Z: Budokai Tenkaichi 3 (2007) (Appule)

=== Tokusatsu ===
- Ultraman Tiga (1996) (Ultraman Tiga)
- Ultraman Dyna (1997) (Narrator)
- Ultraman Retsuden (2011) (Narrator)

=== Dubbing roles ===
- Ghostbusters II (1992 Fuji TV edition) (Egon Spengler (Harold Ramis))
- Kansas (Wade (Andrew McCarthy))
- Mighty Morphin Power Rangers: The Movie (Tommy Oliver/White Power Ranger (Jason David Frank))
- Mystery Date (James Lew (BD Wong))
- New Superman (Jimmy Olsen) (Michael Landes))
- Nine Months (Arnie (Charles Martinet))
- Seven (1998 Fuji TV edition) (Detective Mills (Brad Pitt))
- The Lion King II: Simba's Pride (Nuka)
- The Shawshank Redemption (Tommy Williams (Gil Bellows))
- Young Guns II (1995 Fuji TV edition) ('Arkansas' Dave Rudabaugh (Christian Slater))

=== Others ===
- News Japan (1994–2015) (Narrator)
- Sanma no Super Karakuri TV (1996–2014) (Narrator)
- Waratte Koraete (1996–present) (Narrator)
- Ainori (1999–2009) (Narrator)
- Himitsu no Kenmin Show (2006–present) (Narrator)
- Jōhō 7days (2008–present) (Narrator)
