= Ultraman Tiga (character) =

Superhero from the 1996 series Ultraman Tiga

- Ultraman Series character
- Ultraman Tiga as portrayed in original series.
- First appearance: Ultraman Tiga (1996)
- Created by: Tsuburaya Productions
- Designed by: Hiroshi Maruyama
- Portrayed by: Shunsuke Gondo; Koji Nakamura
- Voiced by: Yuji Machi (original; grunts); Japanese: Hiroshi Nagano (speaking voice (1996-97), 2000 & 2008); Ryohei Nakao (2003); You Murakami (2015); English: Jay Dee Witney (2015, English dub)

In-universe information
- Aliases: Tiga; Tiga Dark (Original name/form)
- Species: Ultra
- Gender: Male
- Origin: None, existed since the Super Ancient Civilization (30 million years prior)

Ultraman Tiga (ウルトラマンティガ, Urutoraman Tiga) is a fictional superhero from the 1996 Ultra Series, Ultraman Tiga, which ended a 15 year long hiatus of live-action shows produced in Japan after Ultraman 80 ended in 1981. In the series, the titular character's body bonded with Daigo Madoka, a man who was a descendant of Ultra Ancient Civilization to fight against monstrous threats during the series' course. Tiga's case is regarded as a "human Ultraman" (人間ウルトラマン, Ningen Urutoraman), due to his host Daigo controlling his body instead of Tiga being in control of himself. Following the destruction of the dark ruler Gatanothor, Daigo lost his ability to transform into Tiga, signifying that the ancient warrior's role on Earth was over.

During the run of the series, Tsuburaya Productions celebrated the 30th anniversary of Ultraman Series, by having Ultraman Tiga meet with an alternate version of the original Ultraman. Aside from that, Tiga's appearance laid a huge impact on the Ultra Series, as not only being the first Heisei Era Ultra Warrior, but also introduced the ability for Ultra Warriors to change their forms and appearances. Tiga himself enjoyed a huge popularity among fans and started to appear in succeeding media of the Ultra Series, either as himself (without proper explanation) or as an alternate reality version of the character. His series in fact won the Best Dramatic Presentation of Seiun Award in 1998.

Ultraman Tiga's grunts were provided by Yūji Machi (真地 勇志, Machi Yūji) during his series, who would later become the narrator of Ultraman Dyna, the succeeding series after Tiga. His grunts were recorded and recycled for Tiga's future appearances. During the movie Ultraman Tiga: The Final Odyssey and Superior Ultraman 8 Brothers, his grunts were provided by Hiroshi Nagano, Daigo Madoka's actor. Meanwhile, his suit actors were in Koji Nakamura (中村 浩二, Nakamura Kōji) Multi and Power Type and Shunsuke Gondō (権藤 俊輔, Gondō Shunsuke) in Multi and Sky Type.

== Character conception ==
The design of Ultraman Tiga was meant to be a break from the traditional red colored Ultras. His proposed coloring was red, blue, purple and silver, a trend that would be passed on to succeeding Ultra Warriors of Heisei Era Series. Tiga's first archetypal design was made in a form of a clay statue by Marbling Fine Arts company. Two other prototypes were also submitted by said company, and in the end one of them was chosen as Tiga's default design. The other two statues were however incorporated to the story line as stone bodies of Tiga's past allies, who fought alongside him to protect the ancient civilization but unlike Tiga, their bodies were destroyed by Golza and Melba before Tiga's body merge with Daigo. Also the original setting for the pyramid was supposedly to house five instead of three Ultras, with two statues being destroyed and the other two merged with Tiga to bestow him his Type Change abilities. The crystal on his forehead was meant as a trademark to reflect the sunlight along his crest during lighting effect. One of his NG design was recycled by Maruyama into Evil Tiga, an Ultraman that appeared in episode 44 of his series, who went rogue after a forced merger with his human host, Keigo Masaki. The very first suit to be made was the Multi Type, where it lacks peepholes for the suit actor and photography was taken by the Yomiuri Advertising for the promotional campaign. His Color Timer changes thanks to the built-in diode. His gold/silver striped Protector was crafted through die-cutting and due to the initial one had its color easily wear off, the new one has become part of the suit's fabric since the shooting of episode 5 and 6. In the original planning, Tiga's Protector (as well as the Tiga Slicer attack) was meant to be used as a removable boomerang. Unlike the Showa Era series, Tiga's aerial combat scene was done with combination of Chroma key, doll props and CGI. According to designer Hiroshi Maruyama, the Sparklence (Ultraman Tiga's transformation item) was designed by Bandai and denied any participation in its creation.

Since the suit actors of Ultraman Tiga have different physique, his suit for each Type Change was produced twice and differently for them:

- Due to being heavily trained in stamina, Koji Nakamura is assigned to portray the muscular and thicker image. Also because of said physique, Nakamura is well suited to portray Power Type and his proficiency in Kenpō gives a sharp movement. There is also a variation of Sky Type suit made for Koji Nakamura, but it was never used in the series and only appear in the show's opening sequence.
- On the other hand, Shunsuke Gondo has a sleeker body type akin to Bin Furuya, the actor of original Ultraman. He also portray the latter character in episode 49 as part of a crossover with Tiga.

In Ultraman Tiga: The Final Odyssey, the three newer forms that appeared in the movie, Tiga Dark, Tiga Tornado and Tiga Blast supposedly would have had their design separated from Tiga's Type Change forms. But because of time constraints, it was decided to simply have them recolored from original costume designs.

=== Naming ===
Tiga's name came from the Malaysian and Indonesian for the digit number 3, referring to Tiga's Type Change ability, which revolves around him changing into three forms.

In episode 2 of the series, after Tiga first appeared, GUTS tried to find a suitable name for the giant. With sub-captain Munakata's suggestion Mountain Gulliver (マウンテンガリバー, Maunten Garibā) being rejected, it was Daigo who gives the giant his actual name, which was accepted by the rest of GUTS' members. The rejected name Mountain Gulliver seems to be based on the 1726 Irish novel Gulliver's Travels.

== History ==
=== Past ===
30 million years prior to the series, Tiga was one of the ancient giants to be swayed by the darkness and rose to prominence when several of the ancient giants corrupted due to the stresses of the civil war. He was considered to be the strongest of all Dark Giants in existence and had defeated many of the heroic Ultras in the past but after falling in love with a human named Yuzare, Tiga switched sides. He betrayed his own comrades and stole their powers for his own before sealing them as stone statues. The redeemed Tiga join forces with two other unnamed giants to protect the ancient Earth from countless catastrophes and numerous dark forces. With their deed done, the giants left their bodies as stone statues in the Land of Tiga Pyramid (ティガの地のピラミッド, Tiga no Ji no Piramido), while their essence departed to space.

5,000 before Ultraman Tiga in Revival of the Ancient Giant, the sorcerer Dogramagma threatened the peace of Sakimoria village with a giant dogū statue monster Degouf until Ultraman Tiga saved the village. When Dogramagma threatened the village again and the Tiga Pyramid, a time-displaced Tsubasa Madoka tried to transform into Tiga, but his incompatibility resulted with the half-sized Tiga barely able to kill Jomonoid until Amui used the Sparklemnce on himself, successfully bringing the giant in his full power and destroying both Dogouf and Dogramagma.

=== Ultraman Tiga ===
Ultraman Tiga facing against his final opponent, Gatanothor.

In the present day, two ancient monsters, Golza and Melba, were awakened and attempted to destroy the giant statues in Tiga Pyramid. GUTS members (under guidance by Yuzare's hologram) discovered these statues but during Golza and Melba's attack, Daigo merged with Tiga's statue and reanimated the giant once more, fighting against Golza and Melba. Although Golza managed to escape, Tiga nonetheless killed Melba. Starting from that point, Tiga would return once again to battle against other monsters and alien threats, including a returned Golza and those who responsible for the destruction of the ancient civilization. At one point, Daigo/Tiga was brought into the past and met an alternate incarnation of the original Ultraman, joining forces to destroy the sealed monster Yanakagi. Near the finale, Daigo revealed his identity to Rena and Captain Iruma before facing against the great destroyer Gatanothor. The giant monster was too great for Tiga to handle and in the end, he was petrified into a stone statue. It was then the light of humanity was able to revive Tiga and turn him into Glitter Tiga, giving him the power to defeat Gatanothor and save the Earth. However, Tiga's victory came at a cost: Daigo was no longer able to become Tiga after the Sparklence disintegrated into dust after his final battle.

=== Ultraman Tiga: The Final Odyssey ===
Two years after Tiga defeated Gatanothor, TPC awakened the dark giants by accident during their trip to R'lyeh. Daigo was haunted by Camearra's dreams, for she was intent on luring him into R'lyeh and transforming into Tiga Dark. Although Daigo was forced to comply to their and thus, breaking Yuzare's protective barrier, Daigo refused to join them and in a similar fashion to the original Tiga, slowly regained his light by absorbing Darramb's strength and Hudra's speed before killing them. Facing Camearra in his partially restored light form, Tiga was on the verge of defeat until Rena appeared and provided assistance. When shielding Rena from Camearra's attack, this fully restored his light form but his actions of saving Rena (which is a sign of genuine love) had made Camearra even outraged and she turned into Demonthor, killing Tiga with relative ease until the remains of ancient giants revived him into Glitter Tiga to finish the monster. Although Daigo had returned to his normal life, Tiga's whereabouts (including his Dark Sparklence) remain ambiguous.

As mentioned above, Tiga's grunt was provided by Hiroshi Nagano in conjunction with Daigo's speaking voice but when the movie was featured in episode 8 of Shin Ultraman Retsuden, Tiga's scene was re-dubbed with Yūji Machi's grunts instead.

=== Subsequent history ===
- Ultraman Dyna (1997–98): Although not appearing, the giant was mentioned and referenced several times in the series. Ultraman Dyna, the series' titular Ultra Warrior is considered by many in-series to be a spiritual successor to Ultraman Tiga, due to sharing the similar ability to Type Change.
- Ultraman Tiga & Ultraman Dyna: Warriors of the Star of Light (1998): In this crossover movie, Tiga was summoned by the hopes of survivors from Queen Monera's attack after Ultraman Dyna was captured and killed by the villain. The giant rescued and revived his successor and they team up and saved the Earth from Queen Monera's reign of terror. After the battle, the two disappeared into glittering lights and Tiga gave Dyna his own light, therefore further cementing the latter as his official successor. In this movie, Tiga Multi Type demonstrated the technique called TD Special (TDスペシャル, Tē Dē Supesharu), combining his Zeperion Ray with Dyna's Empowered Solgent Ray.
- Ultraman Gaia: The Battle in Hyperspace (1999): Tiga and Dyna are summoned by Tsutomu via the Red Sphere when Ultraman Gaia was brutally defeated by King of Mons and its servants, Basiliss and Sculla. Tiga chased Scylla to the underwater and had a short scuffle before destroying it with Zeperion Ray, further weakening King of Mons and for Gaia to finally ending the destroyer's own life. The trio returned to their home worlds when Tsutomu wished for the Red Sphere's nonexistent.
- Ultraman Boy no Urukoro (2003): In this series, Tiga is voiced by Ryohei Nakao (中尾 良平, Nakao Ryōhei).
- Superior Ultraman 8 Brothers (2008): In this film, Ultraman Tiga was transformed by Daigo Madoka (both are alternate reality versions of themselves) and personally fought against Super Alien Hipporito before he was joined by Dyna, Gaia, the alternate Ultra Brothers and Mebius in defeating Giga Khimaira and the dark mastermind himself.
- Ultraman Ginga (2013): Ultraman Tiga's Spark Doll was among the Spark Dolls to fall into the possession of Dark Lugiel and was corrupted into Tiga Dark until the recently redeemed Jean-Nine defeated him and his Spark Doll state was claimed by Hikaru. Kenta briefly used the Spark Doll alongside Chigusa (Ultraman) and a reformed Seiichirō to hold off Super Grand King long enough for Ginga to free Misuzu. In the aftermath of Ginga's battle with Lugiel, Ultraman Tiga and other Spark Dolls were freed from their curse and return to space. In the Extra Episode, a copy of Ultraman Tiga's Spark Doll was utilized by Kenta again to fight Zetton, who was controlled by Dark Lugiel's former minion, Alien Magma. In the original plan, Tiga Dark was meant to be used by Tomoya's father instead of being a corrupted version of himself.
  - Ultraman Ginga Theater Special (2013): Ultraman Tiga's Spark Doll was briefly used by Hikaru in order to fight against Tyrant, who was "Darklived" by Alien Icarus. Having been drained up most of his energy, Tiga was almost defeated until Tomoya brought Jean-nine into the battle and the two defeated Tyrant, separating Alien Icarus from the six Spark Dolls.
  - Ultraman Ginga Theater Special: Ultra Monster Hero Battle Royal! (2014): Ultraman Tiga was among the sketches that Tomoya drew in his book until a strange cosmic energy wave took effect thus materializing Ultraman Tiga and other sketches into Spark Dolls. Tiga was used by Chigusa when she and her friends tried to play using Ultra Warrior Spark Dolls until a software bug created a group of five dark Ultramen for them to fight. Chigusa/Ultraman Tiga fought against Evil Tiga and won by firing his/her Zeperion Ray.
- Ultraman Ginga S The Movie (2015): Tiga was among the Heisei Ultras that were held captive by Etelgar until the UPG members freed them. While the other Heisei Ultras made their way to Etelgar's tower, Tiga, Dyna and Gaia were left behind to fight against Five King before joining other Heisei Ultras to destroy Etelgar's castle. In the Ginga S Movie, he was voiced by You Murakami (村上 ヨウ, Murakami Yō) and Jay Dee Witney in the English dub. As with all Heisei Ultraman, Tiga's dialogue is accompanied with him shouting the name of his attacks. This part was made intentional by movie director Koichi Sakamoto, who wants the young audiences (children) to remember their attacks.
- Ultraman X (2015): Though not himself, but since Tiga donated his powers to Hikaru and Sho, his apparition appeared when Ultraman Ginga Victory used his main finisher Zeperion Ray against Guar Spectre.
- Ultraman X The Movie (2016): An alternate Ultraman Tiga was revealed to be one of the ancient Ultra Warriors that sealed the Devil Beast Zaigorg in the Baraji Ruins in the ancient times. In the present day, a statue of him was shown in the same ruin as well and his Sparklence was picked up by Yuto Tamaki, the son of an archaeologist named Tsukasa Tamaki. However, when a greedy adventurer named Carlos Kurosaki stole the blue stone that was used to seal Zaigorg, the monster reawakened once more. Tiga's statue was scanned by Dr. Guruman of Xio, who planned to create his Cyber Card alongside that of the original Ultraman. Tiga was reawakened once more in the modern times when Yuto's will to save his mother activated the Sparklence, allowing Yuto to use Tiga's power and join Ultraman X and the original Ultraman to fight against Zaigorg. Tiga faced against Gorg Antlar and joined X in a formation of Beta Spark Armor. According to the movie pamphlet, Tiga was meant to fight against Gorg Fire Golza instead of Gorg Antlar. He is also proposed to have an aerial combat with Gorg Dorako, which eventually replaced with none other than Antlar, wanting its crash-landing scene resembling an insectoid creature. (Note: Based on Dorako from episode 25 of Ultraman.)
- Ultraman Orb (2016): Ultraman Tiga was mentioned to be the sealer of Maga-Tanothor before Jugglus released the King Demon Beast. Upon its defeat, Gai salvaged Tiga's Ultra Fusion Card and used it with the Ultraman Card to transforms into Ultraman Orb's Spacium Zeperion after losing his original form in 1908. Orb also utilized Tiga's powers such as Power Type's strength and Sky Type's speed. During the final episode of the series, Tiga and the other Ultra Fusion Cards in Gai's possession transform into physical projections of themselves to assist Ultraman Orb in delivering the finishing blow on Magata no Orochi while Juggler hold off the monster long enough to expose its weak spot.
- Ultraman R/B (2018): Ultraman Tiga's R/B Crystal was buried underground and was freed by the Ultras in the middle of a battle with Gue-Basser, providing access to their air-oriented form Wind.
- Ultraman Z (2020): The power of Ultraman Tiga was copied into the Ultraman Tiga Medal (ウルトラマンティガメダル, Urutoraman Tiga Medaru), one of the many Ultra Medals in the Land of Light. When Genegarg stole them and destroyed by Ultraman Z's Zestium Beam, said Medal was among those scattered from the explosion and salvaged by Juggler before returning it to Z. Using Gamma Future, Z can summon a copy of Tiga to perform Zeperion Ray.
- Ultraman Trigger: New Generation Tiga (2021): Sizuma Foundation's president, Mitsukuni Shizuma, is a TPC investigation officer who came from the world where Ultraman Tiga was taking place, hence Tiga himself appearing in several scenes of Mitsukuni's flashback. During Trigger's fight with Kyrieloid, bits of Tiga's light was revealed to have been in Mitsukuni, allowing Yuna to summon the Ultra with Yuzare's power and assisting Trigger in against his old foe.

== Profile ==
- Height: micro ~ 53 m (120 m as Glitter Tiga, 20 m when used by Tsubasa)
- Weight: 44,000 t (100,000 t as Glitter Tiga, 17,000 t when used by Tsubasa)
- Flight Speed: Mach 5 (Multi Type), Mach 3 (Power Type), Mach 7 (Sky Type)
- Running Speed: Mach 1.5 (Multi Type), Mach 1 (Power Type), Mach 2 (Sky Type)
- Jumping Power: 800 m (Multi Type), 500 m (Power Type), 1000 m (Sky Type)
- Time Limit: 3 minutes (Note: When incompletely merged with Tsubasa, the time limit is shorter than the usual.)
- Birthplace: Unknown
- Year Debut: 1996
- First Appearance: Ultraman Tiga (1996)

=== Description ===
As the official website of Tsuburaya Productions stated: "From 30 million years ago, the giant of light was revived, demonstrating the ability to Type Change. He is transformed by Daigo Madoka, a member of the investigation team GUTS from the Earth Peace Alliance TPC."

=== Transformation ===
In all of Tiga's hosts, they transforms through the use of Sparklence (スパークレンス, Supākurensu) (Note: Also spelt as Spark Lence (スパークレンス, Supāku Rensu).) or any of its variations. In certain situations, Daigo Madoka transforms by placing the Sparklence in the same position as his chest before pressing the button and the Sparklence's "wing" appendages form Tiga's Protector before forming the whole body. This technique was briefly shown transforming him into a human-sized Tiga, which was once used against the Alien Raybeak platoon. In most episodes and other succeeding media, the hosts transform by raising the Sparklence and pressed the button in a similar way to the original Ultraman via his Beta Capsule. Upon transformation, their body change into light energies that eventually turns into Ultraman Tiga.

=== Forms, powers and abilities ===
The true physical appearance of Ultraman Tiga is regarded as "the light itself incarnated through mankind's united hope upon his stone statue". In most forms, Tiga demonstrates the use of Hand Slash (ハンドスラッシュ, Hando Surasshu) beam attack.

All of his forms retain the Protector (プロテクター, Purotekutā) breastplate and Tiga Crystal (ティガクリスタル, Tiga Kurisutaru), the latter allows him to Type Change (タイプチェンジ, Taipu Chenji) into forms based on fighting abilities and body performances:

- Multi Type (マルチタイプ, Maruchi Taipu): Tiga's default form, which bears both the color red and purple. In this form, his fighting performances is balanced in terms of agility, strength and ranged attacks. In the past, this form was resulted when Tiga Dark stealing Camearra's, Darramb's and Hudra's powers. His main finisher is the Zeperion Beam (ゼペリオン光線, Zeperion Kōsen), (Note: Spelt as Zepellion Beam in Crunchyroll subtitle episode 14 of Ultraman X.) which is performed when Tiga makes V-shaped cross arm formation, spreading them open and drawing them backwards, creating a line of light before he performs an L-style beam similar to Ultraseven's Wide Shot. In episode 41, he also used the Multi Spacium Ray (マルチ・スペシウム光線, Maruchi Supeshiumu Kōsen), which was evidently analogous in both appearance and power level to the original Ultraman's signature attack. In The Final Odyssey, after absorbing the powers of Darramb and Hyudra, Tiga Blast evolved further into this form due to his act of saving Rena as a genuine love.
- Power Type (パワータイプ, Pawā Taipu): Tiga's first alternate form, which bears the color red. It focuses on strength, defense and enhanced firepower at the cost of his own speed. In the past, this form was obtained when Tiga stole Darramb's strength. This form's finisher is the Deracium Beam Torrent (デラシウム光流, Derashiumu Kōryū) and an alternate version of the Zeperion Ray.
- Sky Type (スカイタイプ, Sukai Taipu): Tiga's second alternate form, which bears the color purple. It focuses on speed and aerial combat at the cost of strength and firepower. In the past, this form was obtained when Tiga stole Hyudra's speed. This form's finisher is Runboldt Beam Shell (ランバルト光弾, Ranbaruto Kōdan).

In addition, Tiga also have accessed these forms:

- Glitter Tiga (グリッターティガ, Gurittā Tiga): Tiga's strongest form, resulted when he was revived through immense light entering his body. This form debuted in the last episode when Tiga lost to Gatanothor and was revived when children from over the world donated their light to Tiga. This form appeared once more in The Final Odyssey when the lights of deceased ancient Ultramen entered Tiga's body. In this form, Tiga's ability parameters are heightened beyond what his Type Change forms can offer and is twice larger (120 m), allowing him to fight against gigantic opponents. He retains the appearance of Multi Type and is covered with the Glittering Shield (グリタリングシールド, Gurittaringu Shīrudo) that repels any incoming projectiles. (Note: His Glittering Shield shines for a longer period in The Final Odyssey due to the lights of the ancient Ultraman being larger as opposed to those of humanity in the episode final, where the Glittering Shield disappeared moments after his revival.) His finishers are Glitter Zeperion Ray (グリッターゼペリオン光線, Gurittā Zeperion Kōsen) and Timer Flash Special (タイマーフラッシュスペシャル, Taimā Furasshu Supesharu). In The Final Odyssey, he used the Zerades Beam (ゼラデスビーム, Zera Desu Bīmu) when trying to detonate Camearra/Demonthor in off-screen.
  - Glitter Version (グリッターバージョン, Gurittā Bājon): Featured in Superior 8 Ultraman Brothers. The alternate world Tiga and the rest of alt-Ultra Warriors received strength from the citizen's hopes and gained a power boost that is identical to Tiga's Glitter Tiga. His attack combined with the alternate Ultras, was called Superior Myth Flasher (スペリオルマイスフラッシャー, Superioru Maisu Furasshā), made by combining their original finisher attacks. Unlike Glitter Tiga, this form stays in the same height.
  - In Ginga S The Movie, Tiga and other Heisei Ultra Warriors utilizes Crossover Formation (クロスオーバーフォーメーション, Kurosu Ōbā Fōmēshon), a form which is identical to Glitter Tiga but in truth a momentary power boost utilized to strengthen their finishers and destroy Etelgar's castle.
- Tiga Dark (ティガダーク, Tiga Dāku): Tiga's black and silver form, transformed from the Black Sparklence (ブラックスパークレンス, Burakku Supākurensu). This is in fact Tiga's original appearance during his days as a dark giant. According to Darramb, Tiga Dark was considerably the strongest of the dark giants but because of Daigo using his power for good, his full power could not be utilized. When fighting against the former, Tiga utilizes Dark Swim (ダークスイム, Dāku Suimu), allowing him to move in the underwater environment at the speed of 900 km/h.
- Tiga Tornado (ティガトルネード, Tiga Torunēdo): Tiga's partially restored light form, which obtained when Tiga Dark absorbed Darramb's Fire Magnum. This form retained the black color of Tiga Dark and had the red markings in the same position and coloring as his Multi Type. His main finisher was the Deracium Beam Torrent.
- Tiga Blast (ティガブラスト, Tiga Burasuto): Tiga's second partially restored light form, which was obtained when Tiga Tornado absorbed Hudra's Hugust. This form had the purple markings in the same position and coloring of Multi Type, nearing close to the appearance of said form while retaining his darker face and a black and silver-colored Protector. His main finisher was the Runboldt Beam Shell.

== In other media ==
=== Apps ===
- In late 2013, LINE announces the second release of Ultraman stickers sold at the price of US$1.99. Tiga was among the caricatures featured in the sets alongside other Ultra Warriors and Ultra Monsters.
- Ultraman Tiga is one of the characters to be featured in the smartphone game app, Ultra Universe (ウルトラユニバース, Urutora Unibāsu).
- As a tie-in to the Ginga S Movie, a smartphone game was released, called the Ultra 10 Braves (ウルトラ10勇士, Urutora Jū Yūshi). Tiga was reimagined as the original ninja from Sanada Ten Braves, Kirigakure Saizō (霧隠才蔵), also called as Tiga (弖雅). His main weapon is a pair of katana.
- Ultraman Tiga is among the available icons of Ultra Warriors and Ultra Kaiju in the Japanese smartphone app Niwasaki (ニワサキ) made with the joint collaboration with Tsuburaya's Ultra Series.

=== Comic Book ===
- In the Dark Horse Comics comic book adaptation of the series, Tiga was depicted in a similar way to his series counterpart (the English Dub version) but with additional plots such as having him meeting Daigo in a dimensional subspace. His two other companions (whose statues were destroyed by Golza and Melba) had a much larger role compared to their series counterparts such as assisting Tiga in protecting ancient human civilizations and bestowing Daigo with the knowledge to Type Change, the latter was one of the leftover plans of the original series which never made it into the final cut.

=== Commercials ===
- Tiga stars in a 2014 Indonesian commercial, featuring the communications service provider Bolt ULTRA LTE. Here, the Ultra Warrior demonstrated the service's efficiency in speed, coverage and value.
- As part of Ultra Series' collaboration with UNIQLO, Tiga made his appearance in fighting against Gan-Q.

=== Manga ===
- Ultraman Tiga appeared as one of the characters in Mega Monster Battle: Ultra Adventure NEO. This Tiga is from a universe that is similar to the original, which took place after the battle of Gatanothor but instead of disappearing, Tiga maintains his duty while Daigo is nowhere to be seen or mentioned. He first appeared when several aliens try to aim Ai and Kanegon (the manga's protagonists) for the Battle Nizer and killed them, fighting with the help of Kanegon/Ai's Red King. Tiga would reappear later on, fighting against the revived Gatanothor and transformed into Glitter Tiga by Ai, Kanegon and Vittorio's lights, using such power to defeat the monster again. He was last seen disappearing after being shot by EX Zetton, but Ai reassured that the Ultraman is fine.

=== Novels ===
- Ultraman Tiga writer Hideyuki Kawakami wrote and published a novel named Forest of the White Fox in 2000, featuring an expansion of the series' episode 16 as Daigo sought the help of Kagetatsu to save Rena. The novel also gave the origin of the episode 31 monster Bizaaamo as a bonus story.
- Another Genesis, a novel series launched in 2012 has Ultraman Tiga portrayed in a similar way to his past. A long time ago, Tiga was a servant to a villain named Mirror Master and carried out his master's wishes by killing the innocent. Once he was bestowed with the light of reason from Luna, Tiga developed a change of heart, feeling genuinely remorseful for his past actions and tried to atone by fighting his own master, which ended up with him trapped in a prison of darkness made when Mirror Master lured Tiga with a duplicate of himself. Unlike other characters in said novel, Tiga retained his original appearance as Multi-Type, though the only changes he received was his muscular body and his markings looking like armor.
- For the 20th anniversary of Ultraman Gaia, writer Keiichi Hasegawa wrote and published the novel The Adventure in Hyperspace, taking place 20 years after the 1999 movie Ultraman Gaia: The Battle in Hyperspace. Here, it was explained that the Tiga that was summoned by Tsutomu to assist Gaia and defeated Sculla was indeed Daigo, who eventually lost his memory when the first Red Sphere vanished and return him to his world. In order to seek his help again, Tsutomu boarded the XIG Adventure to find Gamu, which lead him in the middle of Ultraman Tiga: The Final Odyssey. Daigo regained his memories and lead the GUTS members in Artdessei as he joined forces with Asuka/Dyna and Super GUTS in assisting Gaia during his fight with Charija's monsters. After killing the monster Galra, Daigo transformed into Tiga and fought in an aerial combat against Psycho Mezard, finally teaming up with the other two Ultras in fighting Demon Gyrares XIV.
- As part of the TDG Project, Chiaki J. Konaka wrote a novel adaptation of Ultraman Tiga in 2019. In the Novel, Konaka revealed the backstory behind the formation of the TPC as well as backstory for Daigo's childhood as an orphan.
- Written by Keiichi Hasegawa, Tiga appears in the spin-off novel of the Ultraman manga, titled Ultraman Suit Another Universe. It features an alternate iteration of Daigo Madoka as the novel's original character and partnering with Yuzare to stop a trio of dark figures from transforming humans into monsters. Along the way, Daigo crossed paths with other Ultraman Suit users, Shinjiro, Dan and Hokuto when hunting the monsters. The mangaka Eiichi Shimizu designed Daigo's Ultraman Suit in the likeness of Ultraman Tiga, bearing the same red, purple and silver tricolor with yellow striped Protector. He wields an original weapon named Zeperion Spear (ゼペリオンスピア, Zeperion Supia) gauntlet, in addition to the original Ultraman's Zeperion Ray. The Tiga Suit also made its appearance as one of the playable characters in the 2020 smartphone game Ultraman: Be Ultra.
  - Also in the novel, Daigo faced against an opponent who initially appeared wearing a black copy of his Tiga Suit, later revealing to be Evil Tiga. In his initial appearance, he reminisces Tiga Dark due to being silhouetted in a black aura. The Evil Tiga Suit utilizes Evil Fork (イーヴィルフォーク, Īviru Fōku), a weapon in similar function to Tiga's Zeperion Spear.

=== Video games ===
- Ultraman Fighting Evolution series
  - Ultraman Fighting Evolution 3 (2004): Tiga is a playable character in the game, participating in level scenarios themed after his fight with Golza (Empowered), Evil Tiga and Gatanothor. The game's narrator, Yuji Machi is also the grunt voice actor for Tiga.
  - Ultraman Fighting Evolution Rebirth (2005): Tiga participated in the game's story mode, facing against Kyrieloid and is last seen among the group of Ultra Warriors that aided Ultraman Cosmos in purifying Neo Chaos Darkness II from Alien Mefilas.
- Compati Hero Series: Tiga is featured as a playable character in most of the games provided.
  - Charinko Hero (2003): In this racing game, Tiga competed in a race by riding tricycles themed after elements of their series. Tiga is L (Light)-class and rides a tricycle that resembles the GUTS Wing.
  - Great Battle Full Blast (2012)
  - Lost Heroes (2013): Though lacking combination attacks with other characters (from Ultra Series or other franchises), Tiga demonstrated the attack called Type Change Combi (タイプチェンジ・コンビ, Taipu Chenji Konbi), where he attacks the opponent with Power Type and Sky Type before reverting to Multi Type and launch Zeperion Ray. This feat is carried over to its sequel game, Lost Heroes 2 (2015).
  - Super Heroes Generation (2014)
- Ultraman Fusion Fight! (2016): Tiga is one of the available characters in the arcade game, which corresponded to the 2016 Ultra Series Ultraman Orb. Aside from that, Tiga's card can also be used to create several combination/Fusion Up for Ultraman Orb, such as the aforementioned Spacium Zeperion, Sky Dash Max (Tiga Sky Type and Ultraman Max), Zeperion Solgent (Tiga Multi type and Dyna Flash Type) and Power Strong (Tiga Power Type and Dyna Strong Type).
- City Shrouded in Shadow (2017): Ultraman Tiga appears in the ninth level of the survival game fighting against his adversary Kyrieloid II (who, like him, has two forms meant to mimic his power and sky type modes) while the players attempt to escape and survive their duel, which takes place next to a railway.
- GigaBash (2022): Ultraman Tiga, along with Ultraman, Alien Baltan, and Tiga's former lover Camearra, appear as guest fighters in a DLC for the game released on November 8, 2023. Two of Tiga's taunts transform him into his Power or Sky Type (which can be reversed back to his Multi Type if the same taunt is triggered) in order to affect his strength or speed in battle, and his ultimate attack involves him shooting beams while in his Glitter form.

== Human hosts ==
=== Daigo Madoka ===
Daigo Madoka
- Ultra Series character
- Hiroshi Nagano as Daigo Madoka in episode 39 of Ultraman Tiga.
- First appearance: Ultraman Tiga
- Created by: Tsuburaya Productions
- Portrayed by: Hiroshi Nagano
- Voiced by: Wayne Grayson (English, 4Kids dub)

Daigo Madoka (マドカ・ダイゴ, Madoka Daigo) is the main protagonist of Ultraman Tiga. He is passionately naïve, wide-eyed, eager, earnest and good-hearted, his ancestral origin from the Ultra-Ancient Civilization led him to become Ultraman Tiga. Though not necessarily physically strong or particularly bright, he accepts and embraces his destiny to be Ultraman Tiga and shows that Ultraman Tiga's strength comes from his very human courage, love and spirit. Prior to the series, Daigo was only an ordinary TPC officer, that belonged to the transport division. He was recruited into GUTS by General Sawai after saving him from an invader's UFO. He fights to protect humanity and the world as Ultraman Tiga based on the belief that humanity is not a weak existence that always repeats old mistakes, but can make a brighter future for future generations. At the end of Tiga's fight with Gatanothor, Daigo lost his power but reassured his friends that mankind themselves can become light on their own. Daigo married Rena at the end of The Final Odyssey and eventually had a daughter named Hikari. He returns in the penultimate episode of Ultraman Dyna, nursing Shin Asuka after his battle with Zeluganoid and giving his fellow Ultra host several words of encouragement.

In Superior Ultraman 8 Brothers, an alternate Daigo is a childhood friend of Asuka and Gamu, with the three desired to fulfill their greatest ambitions but instead, all of them failed and assumed normal lives as an adult. On Daigo's part, his desire to follow Rena had him forsook his own dream as an astronaut and instead, he worked as a tourist guide until his encounter with Mirai Hibino/Ultraman Mebius from the prime reality universe changed his viewpoint. Daigo was the only one to believe in the existence of Ultraman but with Mebius was defeated and the monsters made their way for a rampaging spree, he quickly remembers his original dream, allowing him to receive the Sparklence and become an alternate reality Ultraman Tiga before Asuka, Gamu and the alternate Ultra Brothers joined them.

Daigo Madoka is portrayed by Hiroshi Nagano (長野 博, Nagano Hiroshi), one of the performers of V6 and Takashi Nagata (永田 貴嗣, Nagata Takashi) during his childhood in episode 9. According to an interview with then-president of Tsuburaya Productions, Kazuo Tsuburaya, he stated that the decision to appoint Nagano as the main cast is to invoke the image of a youthful protagonist. His first name, Daigo, was devised by the series' producer, Hiroyasu Shibuya while his last name Madoka first appeared in The Final Odyssey.

=== Tsubasa Madoka ===
Tsubasa Madoka
- Ultra Series character
- Shogo Yamaguchi as Tsubasa in Ultraman Tiga Gaiden.
- First appearance: Ultraman Tiga: Revival of the Ancient Giant (2001)
- Created by: Tsuburaya Productions
- Portrayed by: Shogo Yamaguchi

Tsubasa Madoka (マドカ・ツバサ, Madoka Tsubasa) is the Neo Super GUTS rookie and is the protagonist of the direct-to-video Revival of the Ancient Giant. Aged 17-years-old, he is the son of Daigo Madoka, who was born at some point after the conclusion of Ultraman Dyna and like his father, willingly used the strength he possess to help others.

In the beginning of the story, Tsubasa originally went on a scouting mission while piloting the GUTS Eagle Alpha Superior. However, he found himself up against Jomonoid and was brought into the past by mistake, being healed by the villagers and soon participate in an attack against Dogramagma's Jomonoid. Discovering the bronze Sparklence (青銅のスパークレンス, Seidō no Supākurensu), Tsubasa remembered the tales of his father as Ultraman Tiga and tried to do the same with said item. Although he did transformed, Tsubasa's incompatibility only drew out a portion of Tiga's powers, as his version was 20 m short. This was however enough to defeat Jomonoid in his second transformation before being knocked out by Dogouf. Nonetheless, the final enemy was destroyed by Amui, who managed to draw out the full power of Tiga. In aftermath of the battle, Tsubasa met Mahoroba for the last time and noted her similarities to his sister, Hikari, hinting that she may be his ancestor. He soon repaired the GUTS Eagle Alpha Superior and return to his proper timeline through unknown means.

Tsubasa Madoka was portrayed by Shogo Yamaguchi (山口翔悟, Yamaguchi Shogo). His name was under suggestion by Hiroshi Nagano, Daigo's actor.

=== Amui ===
Amui
- Ultra Series character
- Makoto Kamijo as Amui in Ultraman Tiga Gaiden.
- First appearance: Ultraman Tiga: Revival of the Ancient Giant (2001)
- Created by: Tsuburaya Productions
- Portrayed by: Makoto Kamijo

Amui (アムイ) is an 11-year-old Sakimori villager and is the supporting protagonist of Revival of the Ancient Giant, who is given the Tigu Emblem (ティグの紋章, Tigu no Monshō) headdress by Izare that would serve as an important plot to the story.

Amui was the resident who discovered Tsubasa's crashed GUTS Eagle before saving him and had the other villagers nurse him to health. When Tsubasa was unable to fight as Tiga against Jomonoid, Tsubasa senses the link between himself and Tiga. He took up the bronze Sparklence, which prompted him to transform into Tiga, successfully bringing out his full power and put an end to Dogramagma's tyranny. He was hailed as the village hero for his bravery but while trying to find Tsubasa, he discovered that the crashed GUTS Eagle Alpha Superior was gone, knowing that Tsubasa had returned to his proper time.

Amui was portrayed by Makoto Kamijo (上條 誠, Kamijō Makoto). He was originally the youngest actor to portray an Ultra Host until Yuto Tamaki in Ultraman X The Movie would break his record, who also shared the same Ultra Warrior.

=== Yuto Tamaki ===
Yuto Tamaki
- Ultra Series character
- First appearance: Ultraman X: Here It Comes! Our Ultraman (2016)
- Created by: Tsuburaya Productions
- Portrayed by: Serai Takagi

Yuto Tamaki (玉城 ユウト, Tamaki Yūto) is one of the characters in Ultraman X The Movie. He is described as an adventurous boy who aspires to become his mother's assistant in archaeological works.

After Zaigorg was released and Xio were sent into Operation Hell No.3, Yuto was left behind in the Lab Team's care. During that time, he provided them with several artifacts he found and among them was a petrified Sparklence, which he refer to as "ancient people's hammer" (古代人のトンカチ, Kodai-jin no Tonkachi). When discovering that his mother was in danger, his desire to save her resonated with the Sparklence, X Devizer and the blue stone that was used to seal Zaigorg. Seeing this, Guruman had Rui escort him to his mother, and the Sparklence endowed him the strength needed to lift up a steel beam and save her. As Yuto and Tsukasa were about to be trampled by a wall, the boy quickly raised the Sparklence and transformed into Ultraman Tiga, simultaneously fixing the damaged X Devizer for Daichi to transform into X. After the battle, Tiga vanished and returned Yuto to his mother, where she commended him for his bravery.

Yuto was portrayed by Serai Takagi (高木 星来, Takagi Serai). In an original plan, his mother, Tsukasa was meant to use the Sparklence instead due to her actress, Takami Yoshimoto being known for playing Rena Yanase in Ultraman Tiga before Kiyotaka Taguchi changed the plans.

=== Other hosts ===
- In Ultraman Ginga, Ultraman Tiga was transformed into a Spark Doll and was among those in Dark Lugiel's possession. It later ended up in Hikaru's possession, Ultraman Tiga would later be freed once Dark Lugiel was defeated, although another Tiga Spark Doll appeared certain times after the series:
  - During the Theatre Special, Hikaru Raidō (礼堂 ヒカル, Raidō Hikaru), the host of Ultraman Ginga used Tiga's Spark Doll to fight against Tyrant but as it seemed that he would be defeated due to his time limit, Tomoya summoned Jean-nine, assisting the Ultra Warrior in defeating Tyrant.
  - Tiga's original doll was at first was reanimated by Lugiel into Tiga Dark to attack both Hikaru and Tomoya before Taro moved them to safety. After Tiga Dark was defeated by Jean-nine, his doll was collected by Hikaru returning to its proper state.
  - In order to assist Ultraman Ginga in rescuing Misuzu from Gray's influence, Tiga's Spark Doll was used by Kenta Watarai (渡会 健太, Watarai Kenta) to help delay Super Grand King while Hikaru tried to reach Misuzu. He would later use the Spark Doll copy of Tiga against Alien Magma and Zetton in the extra episode.
  - During the events of Ultraman Ginga Theater Special: Ultra Monster ☆ Hero Battle Royal!, Tiga's Spark Doll was among the copies which created when Tomoya's sketchbook of Ultra Monsters radiated by strange cosmic waves. Chigusa Kuno (久野 千草, Kuno Chigusa) would later use the Spark Doll when playing with her comrades but later participated in a fight against a group of five evil Ultramen, facing Evil Tiga. Ultraman Tiga and the other fake Spark Dolls would later reverted into Tomoya's sketchbook once the effects of cosmic ray radiation dried out.

== Reception ==
In an interview, voice actor Yuji Machi stated that he had fond memories of watching the first three series, Ultra Q, Ultraman and Ultraseven as a child and recalls popular monsters such as Pigmon, Kanegon and Alien Baltan, as well as drawing parallels of Dan Moroboshi's relationship with Anne to Daigo and Rena in Tiga. At the age of 18 years old, Machi was trained under the actor Yasuaki Kurata to prepare for his job as a suit actor in outdoor hero shows. He recalled acting as Ultraseven, Ultraman Taro, Leo and 80, as well as monsters Pigmon and Red King.

His first direct involvement with Tsuburaya Productions was the narration of Gridman the Hyper Agent, citing Hikaru Urano's narration of Ultraman as his source inspiration. His voice role of Ultraman Tiga was offered to him by then-producer Nobuyuki Koyama due to his experience as an Ultraman suit actor in outdoor stage shows. The grunts provided by Tiga were carefully devised alongside director Shingo Matsubara and Hirochika Muraishi. Machi calculated that he provided grunts for at least 10 episodes that required him to be present for recording, while the rest was made by reusing his recorded grunt. Episode 13 in particular has him providing different grunts to emphasize Tiga's fight with Alien Raybeak, as the fight was done in real life instead of special effects. His favorite episodes were episode 3 (featuring the actor Hiroyuki Takano), episode 49 (featuring the crossover with the original Ultraman) and the final episode that focuses on Daigo and Rena's relationship.

After the end of Ultraman Tiga, Machi would later on serve as the narrator of Ultraman Dyna and had a cameo appearance in episode 1 of Ultraman Gaia. He also interacted with Shin Asuka's actor, Takeshi Tsuruno while guiding him over the dubbing of Dyna's grunts. His latest reprisal to Tiga was during the Ultra Heroes Expo 2021 Summer Festival in Ikebukuro Sunshine City, noting that it was his first time portraying Tiga talking normally and felt glad that his voice role is well-received by the audiences.

=== Popularity ===
In 2006, a character popularity poll was launched in response to the 40th anniversary of Ultra Series. Based on Oricon's list, Ultraman Tiga was placed seventh in the list in according to the total of voters. He is ranked fourth place in by female voters and tenth place by of male voters. Five years later in the Ultra Series' 45th anniversary, Tiga was placed fourth in the popularity poll after losing to Zero (the first-place winner), who scored the first place and ranked first in 2013 with a total of 9369 voters.

Tiga's host, Daigo, shared his surname Madoka with the main character of Puella Magi Madoka Magica, Madoka Kaname. Because of this, the Japanese fandom (especially in the pixiv site) tends to illustrate Madoka with the Sparklence and/or having her wearing the GUTS uniform.

Ultraman Tiga is also one of the guest of honors in the annual Act Against Aids (AAA) charity concert in Japan, as the character himself appeared during the concert when the songs from his series were played. He was also present in an award ceremony when the Ultra Series was nominated by Guinness World Records as the series with most spin-offs and sequels.

In 2022, NHK ran a Big OOO poll of all the Ultra series leading up to Trigger, Tiga was placed 1st on the list according to a total of 355,563 voters.

=== Merchandise ===
Ultraman Tiga was released multiple times as soft vinyl dolls by Bandai. His first ULTRA-ACT figure (Tsuburaya's official toy-line of poseable action figures) was released on March 26, 2011 with Tiga Sky Type and Tiga Dark's figure was released on April 23 of the same year. In August 2014, Tiga Power Type was released, followed by a reissue of the original Tiga Multi Type, which was meant to coincide with the Blu-Ray release of Ultraman Tiga. There is also a promotion picture which featured the actual character playing his own ULTRA ACT figure. In 2015, two exclusive figure releases were made: first is the re-release of Tiga Power Type and Sky Type bundled in the same box and later in November 2015 for Glitter Tiga bundled with Camearra.
