= Tatsuya Maeda =

Japanese musician and singer from Japan (born 1958)

Tatsuya Maeda (前田 達也, Maeda Tatsuya, was born 22 August 1958 in Naha, Okinawa, USCAR) is a Japanese musician and singer from Japan. Maeda is best known as the singer and guitarist of the theme songs of Ultraman Dyna and Blue SWAT.

== Musical work ==
=== Ultraman: The Ultimate Hero 1993 ===
- "Ultraman Powered" (ウルトラマンパワード, Urutoraman Pawādo)
- "Somewhere in This Universe" (この宇宙のどこかに, Kono Uchū no Doko ka ni)

=== Blue SWAT 1994 ===
- "TRUE DREAM"
- "Evil Pilgrimage ~GET THE WAR~" (邪悪の巡礼~GET THE WAR~, Jaaku no Junrei ~Getto Za Wō~)
- "Sign of Departure" (出発のサイン, Tabidachi no Sain)
- "Power Up Blue Swat ~If You Love~ (パワーアップ・ブルースワット~愛する心があれば~, Pawā Appu Burū Suwatto ~Aisuru Kokoro ga Areba~)
- "Resting Soldiers" (兵士達の休息, Heishitachi no Kyūsoku)
- "HELLO THERE!"

=== Gekisou Sentai Carranger 1996 ===
- "CATCH THE WIND"

=== Ultraman: Super Fighter Legend (OVA) 1996 ===
- "Super-Fighter Ultraman" (超闘士ウルトラマン, Chōtōshi Urutoraman)

=== Ultraman Dyna 1997 ===
- "Ultraman Dyna" (ウルトラマンダイナ, Urutoraman Daina)
- "Now Flash" (いまこそフラッシュ, Ima koso Furasshu)

=== Ultraman Tiga & Ultraman Dyna 1998 ===
- "SHININ on LOVE" (with Hironobu Kageyama)
- "Your Love and My Courage ~ I Do Not Already Grieve" (君の愛と僕の勇気~もう悲しみなんかない, Kimi no Ai to Boku no Yūki ~ Mō Kanashimi Nankanai)

=== Ultraman Neos 2000 ===
- "Ultraman Neos" (ウルトラマンネオス, Urutoraman Neosu)
- "Ultraseven 21" (ウルトラセブン21, Urutorasebun 21)
