= Blue SWAT =

- Genre: Tokusatsu; Superhero fiction Mystery fiction Science fiction
- Created by: Saburō Yatsude
- Developed by: Junichi Miyashita
- Directed by: Makoto Tsuji
- Starring: Souji Masaki; Yuka Shiratori; Kou Domon; Tomoko Higata; Yuki Tanaka
- Narrated by: Tsutomu Tareki
- Music by: Kei Wakakusa
- Country of origin: Japan
- No. of episodes: 51

Production
- Running time: 25 minutes
- Production companies: Toei Company; Asatsu-DK

Original release
- Network: TV Asahi (ANN)
- Release: January 30, 1994 – January 29, 1995

Related
- Tokusou Robo Janperson; Juukou B-Fighter

Blue SWAT (ブルースワット, Burū Suwatto) is a Japanese television show and the 13th installment in the Metal Hero Series franchise. It ran from January 30, 1994 to January 29, 1995 for a total of 51 episodes and one theatrical film, aired as part of the 1994 Toei Super Hero Fair. Blue SWAT deviated from the Metal Hero trend by using a realistic vibe for the series instead of fantastic, over-the-top action by focusing on the martial arts and gunplay aspects of the series. While the mood of the series appealed to the genre's adult fanbase and older viewers, the show was not well received by children, which resulted in a change into a lighter tone midway through the series. The Blue SWAT team later appeared for a special team-up in the final episodes of Juukou B-Fighter.

== Plot ==
When Earth is tearing itself apart by means of crime, pollution and war, aliens choose the time to invade, taking advantage of the lowering of everyone's guard. The Japanese government establishes an elite police organization known as Blue SWAT to combat the aliens known as the Space Mafia. The aliens attack by possessing humans to obtain their goals. When an alien possesses the chief of the Blue SWAT unit to infiltrate the organization, it manages to completely demolish their building of operations and murder all but three SWAT members; Sho, Sara and Sig.

Managing to keep the suits and equipment assigned to them, the three form their own private detective-like agency called Blue Research to continue their mission of defeating the Space Mafia. Now working on their own, their battle with the Space Mafia is only beginning.

== Characters ==
Main cast of Blue SWAT. From left to right: Sumire, Sig, Sho, Sara and Seiji.

=== Blue SWAT/Blue Research ===
- Sho Narumi (鳴海 翔/ショウ, Narumi Shō): The hot-shot mercenary member of the team in metallic blue armor with blue patches, Sho tends to goof off and act on his own. His Blue SWAT officer number is 153. He is an aspiring Olympic triathlete. Upon obtaining the DrumGunner from Gold-Platinum, he is upgraded to Hyper Sho.
- Sara Misugi (美杉 沙羅/サラ, Misugi Sara): The no-nonsense, second-in-command, female member in metallic purple armor with red patches and officer number 077, Sara was a member of the L.A.P.D. before having lost her partner in an incident which she still is deeply bothered by. She demonstrates levelheadedness and often helps to keep Sho in check, and is highly skilled in combat.
- Sig (シグ, Shigu): The leader of the team in gunmetal-grey armor with yellow patches, ID number 011, a calm and intelligent telepath. After being wounded and showing green blood in a battle with an Alien, he reveals that he was part of the Space S.W.A.T., and an alien from a planet devastated by the Space Mafia. He came to Earth and possessed the cadaver of Gou Hirose (広瀬 剛, Hirose Gō), a brain-dead organ donor involved in a traffic accident, in order to survive on the planet and fight the Space Mafia. Although his identity as an Alien originally results in suspicion from Sho and Sara, he quickly earns their trust. In a twist of events, Gou had a son named Zaji who, comatose after being involved in the same accident as Gou, is being possessed by a member of the Space Mafia named Jisp. Sig is, in truth, 800 Earth years old.
- Seiji Usami (宇佐美 星児/セイジ, Usami Seiji): A computer nerd who assists the Blue SWAT in their Blue Research group after he was saved by them. He had originally been listening in on the Blue SWAT headquarters, and quickly contacted the three survivors after their base was destroyed. After they saved him from an Alien which had possessed his boss, he began working with them as their analyst and guide for missions.
- Sumire Asou (麻生 すみれ/スミレ, Asō Sumire): A loudmouth who joins Blue Research as their secretary. She is the only one not initially aware of her employers' role as Blue S.W.A.T.
- Gold-Platinum (ゴールドプラチナム, Gōrudo Purachinamu): A friendly alien who appears late into the series. After giving Sho a special weapon that allows him to upgrade into "Hyper Sho", he becomes a member of the team.

=== Space Mafia ===
An intergalactic crime syndicate of alien invaders. These beings are able to possess or "invade" human beings by force. By doing so, they are able to make quick escapes from host-to-host.

- Jisp/Monsieur J (ジスプ/ムッシュJ) is a member of the Space Mafia and a major villain in Blue Swat. His first host of choice was a comatose boy named Zaji (ザジ Zaji?), the son of Sig's human host. He later used another host, only known as Monsieur J (ムッシュJ Musshu Jei?).
- Zodor (ゾドー, Zodō) is a fang-faced alien who wields a crystal sword and reports directly to Jisp. Zodor's human host is portrayed by Shinichi Sato (佐藤信一 Sato Shinichi?).
- Riga (リーガ, Rīga) is another subordinate of Jisp who welds a whip and a head that resembles a Parasaurolophus.
- Mademoiselle Q/Queen (マドモアゼル・Q/クイーン, Madomoazeru Kyū/Kuīn) is female villain with a "drag-queen" humanoid form and a monstrous bird-like winged form. Queen was later revived during the B-Fighter finale by Jagul, who used her as a pawn before absorbing Queen into her body.
- The Space Mafia Foot Soldiers are aliens that come in different types, can liquify their bodies, and can materialize a mini-computer on their arms to communicate with one another. Once Blue SWAT locates their weak points, the Dictators are sufficient to destroy them.
  - The Leto (レト, Reto) are bluish-colored aliens with small yellow tendrils in their mouths.
  - The Bona (ボナ, Bona) are light green-colored aliens that can elongate their arms and fingers.
  - The Goa (行きます, Ikimasu) are black-colored aliens that are often seen bossing and disciplining the Leto, Bona, and Kell types. Some Goa will either have a whip arm or a blade arm. The most common types of aliens that Blue SWAT encounters, and typically work in packs of three.
  - The Kell (ケル, Keru) are green-colored aliens that have the ability to cloak themselves.
  - The Kui (クイ, Kui) was an alien monster of the Space Mafia. A subspecies of Leto but with shorter mouth tentacles.

==== Space Mafia's monsters ====
The following alien monsters are used by the Space Mafia:

- The Three Death Killer Brothers (デスキーラ三兄弟, Desukīra San Kyōdai), consisting of Goku (ゴク, Goku), Dou (ドー, Dō), and Mon (モン, Mon), are three full-armored aliens who were hired by the Space Mafia to impersonate Blue SWAT and commit crimes to tarnish their reputation. Dou's true form is a skeletal snake. In their latest caper, Mon was killed, but Goku and Dou were able to steal Blue SWAT's armory and kidnap Sumire. Gold Platinum arrived in time to take back the Blue SWAT armor. Goku and Dou were destroyed by the Drumgun Fire. Aliens resembling these three made additional appearances. Goku, Dou, and Mon are voiced by Eisuke Yoda, Eizo Tsuda, and Kazunori Arai respectively.
- Geruma (ゲルマ, Geruma) is a Space Mafia scientist and white-skinned alien warrior that invaded the body of a female earth scientist named Rina Okuyama. When Geruma left Rina's body, the research he working on was accidentally left behind in Rina's mind. Using Rina as bait, Sho planted a tracer on her when Geruma came to abduct her. After collecting his missing research, Geruma was ready to dispose of Rina until the timely intervention of Blue SWAT. Geruma was destroyed by the Drumgun Fire. Geruma is voiced by Tsutomu Tareki.
- Mougu (モーグ, Mōgu) is a four-eyed alien with the ability to invade inanimate objects, including Blue SWAT's Dictators. During his first confrontation with Blue SWAT, Sho was accidentally doused with a chemical that would make him explode. To prevent Sho from getting an antidote, Mougu possessed any vehicle and weapon Sho tried to use. Seiji was able to get the antidote to Sho in time while Sig and Sarah fought Mougu. Hyper Sho dealt the final blow and destroyed Mougu with his Dictator. Mougu is voiced by Wataru Abe.
- Mademoiselle Eva (マドモアゼル・エバ, Madomoazeru Eba), under Queen's orders, was sent to terminate Jisp for his repeated failures to conquer the Earth for the Space Mafia. Ironically, she was destroyed by Jisp. Eva is portrayed by Mayumi Tateishi.
- Kui (クイ, Kui)
- Zazanga (ザザンガ, Zazanga)
- Zaiba (ザイバ, Zaiba) is an alien. During her tenure with the LAPD, Sarah and her old partner John encountered a Zaiba, which was too powerful against Earth firearms. In their fight, John sacrificed himself to save Sarah. Sig also had history with this Zaiba during his time with Space SWAT. The Zaiba reappeared in present-day and invaded the body of a cyborg called the TR-99 which had a protective barrier to shield the Zaiba from the Dictators. Using gunpowder to set off an explosion, Sarah and Sig were able to damage the TR-99 and locate its weakpoint and destroy it. With the TR-99's barrier out of commission, Sarah and Sig destroyed the Zaiba with their Dictators. Additional Zaiba types appeared with various colored heads.
- Yanimi (ヤニミ, Yanimi) is Jisp's third subordinate who wields a bone scythe. In her human form, Yanimi was capable of utilizing wrestling moves against Blue SWAT. In her last stand against Blue SWAT, Yanimi masqueraded as Oto-hime from the legend of Urashima Tarō to seduce a scientist into helping her create deadly turtles that would latch on to people and explode. Yanimi was destroyed by each SWAT's Dictators. Yanimi's human host is portrayed by pro female wrestler Mitsuko Nishiwaki (西脇充子 Nishiwaki Mitsuko?), credited as MIZKO.

== Arsenal ==
- BW-01 Dictator (BW-01 ディクテイター, Bī Daburyū Zero Wan Dikuteitā) : The standard firearm of each Blue S.W.A.T. member, the Dictator is a semi/auto pistol which is able to be freely switched between the two modes.
- BW-02 Plugloada (BW-02 プラグローダ, Bī Daburyū Zero Tsū Puragurōda): Cannon weapon which can be mounted on the Interceptors.
- DrumGunner (ドラムガンナー, Doramugannā): A special weapon provided to Sho by Gold-Platinum. It allows Sho to upgrade his armor to "Hyper Sho." Can be combined with his Dictator for a finishing attack.
- Missile Launcher (ミサイルランチャー, Misairu Ranchā): A heavy-duty rocket launcher which is used against the Aliens.
- Laser Rifle (レーザーライフル, Rēzā Raifuru): A large laser cannon weapon.

== Vehicles ==
- CV-01 Striker (CV-01 ストライカー, Shī Bui Zero Wan Sutoraikā): An Autozam AZ-1, equipped with a large-capacity computer, a gas turbine engine and a built-in strategic system. The Blue SWAT's armored patrol car, driven by Sho. Later on in the series gets destroyed and then repaired and renamed the Blue Striker (ブルーストライカー, Burū Sutoraikā).
- CV-02 Interceptor (CV-02 インターセプター, Shī Bui Zero Tsū Intāseputā) High speed pursuit motorcycles, ridden by Sig and Sara.
- Governor (ガバナー, Gabanā): A Chevrolet Van driven by Seiji. It has various computers which that allow to communicate and to transmit and receive information to the Blue SWAT personnel. It can analyze the whereabouts of hidden enemies and also access to the satellite SS17.
- SS17 (エスエスセブンティーン, Esuesu sebuntīn): Blue SWAT's recon satellites. It plays an effective role in reconnaissance and tracking from space. It's equipped with a laser cannon, a radar and an electromagnetic wave-absorbing barrier.
- Star Fortress (スターフォートレス, Sutāfōtoresu): Gold Platinum's Dimension moving-fortress.
- Pulsar Pod (パルサーポッド, Parusāpoddo): A re-entry capsule used when Gold Platinum descended to Earth. It's launched from the Star Fortress.

== Episodes ==
The episodes are released in five DVD volumes in Japan.

1. Beginning!! (ビギニング!!, Biginingu!!): written by Junichi Miyashita, directed by Makoto Tsuji
2. Lonely Battle (ロンリーバトル, Ronrī Batoru): written by Junichi Miyashita, directed by Makoto Tsuji
3. Invade!! (インヴェード!!, Invēdo!!): written by Junichi Miyashita, directed by Michio Konishi
4. Getaway!! (ゲッタウェイ!!, Gettawei!!): written by Junichi Miyashita, directed by Michio Konishi
5. The Rival!! (ザ・ライバル!!, Za Raibaru!!): written by Junichi Miyashita, directed by Masao Minowa
6. One Chance!! (ワンチャンス!!, Wan Chansu!!): written by Junichi Miyashita, directed by Masao Minowa
7. Scoop!! (スクープ!!, Skūpu!!): written by Nobuo Ogizawa, directed by Kaneharu Mitsumura
8. E.T., Baby (E.Tベイビィ, Ī Tī Beibı): written by Kyoko Sagiyama, directed by Kaneharu Mitsumura
9. Pretty Girl (プリティーガール, Puritī Gāru): written by Hirohisa Soda, directed by Michio Konishi
10. The Mission (ザ・ミッション, Za Misshion): written by Yasuko Kobayashi, directed by Michio Konishi
11. Yesterday... (イエスタディ..., Iesutadi...): written by Akira Asaka, directed by Masao Minowa
12. Goodbye... (グッドバイ..., Guddobai...): written by Junichi Miyashita, directed by Masao Minowa
13. Death Trap (デス・トラップ, Desu Torappu): written by Junichi Miyashita, directed by Kaneharu Mitsumura
14. The Villainous Star is Born (極悪スター誕生, Gokuaku Sutā Tanjō): written by Nobuo Ogizawa, directed by Kaneharu Mitsumura
15. The Aggressive Commercial: Great Broadcast (侵略CM大放送, Shinryaku Shī Emu Dai Hōsō): written by Hirohisa Soda, directed by Michio Konishi
16. Duel!! Assassin Car (激突!! 暗殺カー, Gekitotsu! Ansatsu Kā): written by Yasuko Kobayashi, directed by Michio Konishi
17. The Goofy New Members (ズッコケ新隊員, Zukkoke Shin Taīn): written by Akira Asaka, directed by Masao Minowa
18. The Robbers are the Heroes!! (強盗犯は英雄(ヒーロー)!!, Gōtōhan wa Hīrō!!): written by Mutsumi Nakano, directed by Masao Minowa
19. The Demon Kid's Identity!! (魔少年(デーモンキッド)の正体!!, Dēmonkiddo no Shōtai!!): written by Junichi Miyashita, directed by Kaneharu Mitsumura
20. Sig: The Impact of the Past (シグ衝撃の過去, Shigu Shōgeki no Kako): written by Junichi Miyashita, directed by Kaneharu Mitsumura
21. The Assaulting Old Man's Soul (突撃爺ちゃん魂, Totsugeki Jī-chan Tamashī): written by Nobuo Ogizawa, directed by Michio Konishi
22. Sig Bids Farewell!? (シグよ さらば!?, Shigu yo Saraba!?): written by Yasuko Kobayashi, directed by Michio Konishi
23. The Super Dimensional New Warriors (超時空の新戦士, Chō Jikū no Shin Senshi): written by Junichi Miyashita, directed by Masao Minowa
24. Zero Seconds Before the Earth Conquest (地球征服0秒前, Chikyū Seifuku Zero Byō Mae): written by Junichi Miyashita, directed by Masao Minowa
25. The Detectives' Uneven Procedure (進め凸凹探偵団, Susume Ōtotsu Tanteidan): written by Nobuo Ogizawa, directed by Kaneharu Mitsumura
26. A True Theory: Taro Urashima (真説・浦島太郎, Shinsetsu Urashima Tarō): written by Kyoko Sagiyama, directed by Michio Konishi
27. The Blue SWAT Striking by Mistake!! (ＢＳ(ブルースワット)同士討ち!!, Burū Suwatto Dōshiuchi!!): written by Junichi Miyashita, directed by Kaneharu Mitsumura
28. Ah, Uncertainly Motherly Life (あぁ無常 母の命, Ā Mujō Haha no Inochi): written by Naoyuki Sakai, directed by Michio Konishi
29. Summer Vacation Demon Extermination (夏休み悪霊退治, Natsuyasumi Akuryō Taiji): written by Junichi Miyashita and Yasuyuki Suzuki, directed by Hidenori Ishida
30. Farewell!! Demon Kid (さらば!! 魔少年(デーモンキッド), Saraba!! Dēmonkiddo): written by Junichi Miyashita and Yasuyuki Suzuki, directed by Hidenori Ishida
31. Alien's Innocence... (異星人(エイリアン) 純情す..., Eirian Junjōsu...): written by Nobuo Ogizawa, directed by Kaneharu Mitsumura
32. Miserable Sho: Bomb Victim (無残ショウ爆死, Muzan Shō Bakushi): written by Akira Asaka, directed by Kaneharu Mitsumura
33. Completed!! The Strongest Gun (DrumGun Fire) (完成!! 最強銃(ドラムガンファイヤー), Kansei!! Saikyō Kū (Doramugan Faiyā)): written by Junichi Miyashita and Yasuyuki Suzuki, Masao Minowa
34. Nefarious!! Fake Blue SWAT (極悪!! にせＢＳ(ブルースワット), Gokuaku!! Nise Burū Suwatto): written by Takahiko Masuda, directed by Masao Minowa
35. The Galactic Wolf: The Flaming Iron Fists (銀河狼(ウルフ)炎の鉄拳, Ginga Urufu Honō no Tekken): written by Shozo Uehara, directed by Itaru Orita
36. My Derailed Confidential Directive (脱線僕の㊙指令, Dassen Boku no Maruhi Shirei): written by Yasuko Kobayashi, directed by Itaru Orita
37. The Queen's Declaration of War (女王(クイーン)の宣戦布告, Kuīn no Sensen Fukoku): written by Junichi Miyashita and Yasuyuki Suzuki, directed by Michio Konishi
38. Gold Platinum: Obliteration Command! (ＧＰ(ゴールドプラチナム)抹殺指令, Gōrudo Purachinamu Massatsu Shirei): written by Junichi Miyashita and Yasuyuki Suzuki, directed by Michio Konishi
39. The Space Beast: The Shout of the Life (宇宙獣 命の絶叫, Uchū Jū Inochi no Zekkyō): written by Akira Asaka, directed by Kaneharu Mitsumura
40. People Sends the Trap to the Queen (女王(クイーン)に罠を張れ, Kuīn ni Wana o Hare): written by Nobuo Ogizawa, directed by Kaneharu Mitsumura
41. Invasion!! Murderous Insect (襲来!! 殺人昆虫, Shūrai!! Satsujin Konchū): written by Mutsumi Nakano, directed by Masao Minowa
42. The Messiah is a Demon!! (救世主は悪魔!!, Kyūseishu wa Akuma!!): written by Kyoko Sagiyama, directed by Masao Minowa
43. Blue SWAT's Final Day (ＢＳ(ブルースワット)最期の日, Burū Suwatto Saigo no Hi): written by Junichi Miyashita and Kazuhiro Inoue, directed by Michio Konishi
44. The Cyber Warrior of the Carious Tooth (虫歯の電脳戦士, Mushiba no Dennō Senshi): written by Junichi Miyashita and Ryu Arakawa, directed by Michio Konishi
45. The Targeted Bodies! (狙われた肉体(ボディ)！, Nerawareta Bodi!): written by Akira Asaka, directed by Kaneharu Mitsumura
46. Gold Platinum: Combat Impossible! (ＧＰ(ゴールドプラチナム)戦闘不能！, Gōrudo Purachinamu Sentō Funō!): written by Akira Asaka, directed by Hidenori Ishida
47. Uncovered! The Confidential Program Document (暴け！ ㊙計画書, Abake!! Maruhi Kaikakusho): written by Nobuo Ogizawa, directed by Hidenori Ishida
48. Rebellion! I'm the King (反逆！ 俺が王(キング)だ, Hangyaku! Ore ga Kingu da): written by Nobuo Ogizawa, directed by Kaneharu Mitsumura
49. Showdown! The End of the King (決戦！ 王(キング)の最後, Kessen! Kingu no Saigo): written by Nobuo Ogizawa, directed by Kaneharu Mitsumura
50. Great Duel: Is it Life or Death? (大激突 生か死か, Dai Gekitotsu Ikashika): written by Junichi Miyashita and Yasuyuki Suzuki, directed by Masao Minowa
51. Goodbye, Blue SWAT (グッバイ ＢＳ(ブルースワット), Gubbai Burū Suwatto): written by Junichi Miyashita and Yasuyuki Suzuki, directed by Masao Minowa

== Movies ==
- Blue SWAT: The Movie (compilation of the first two episodes): written by Junichi Miyashita, directed by Makoto Tsuji
- Toei Hero Daishugō (compilation of Janperson: The Movie, Blue SWAT: The Movie, and Super Sentai World): written by Kyoko Sagiyama, directed by Katsuya Watanabe

== Cast ==
- Show Narumi: Souji Masaki (正木 蒼二, Masaki Sōji)
- Sara Misugi: Yuka Shiratori (白鳥 由夏, Shiratori Yuka)
- Sig/Gou Hirose: Kou Domon (土門 廣, Domon Kō)
- Sumire Asou: Tomoko Higata (干潟 智子, Higata Tomoko)
- Seiji Usami: Yūki Tanaka (田中 優樹, Tanaka Yūki)
- Chief Fuwa: Yoshizou Yamaguchi (山口 嘉三, Yamaguchi Yoshizō)
- Mash J: Ryuji Kasahara (笠原 竜司, Kasahara Ryūji)
- Zodor: Shin'ichi Satou (佐藤 信一, Satō Shin'ichi)
- Reega: Shin'yuki Nagai (中井 信之, Nagai Shin'yuki)
- Yanimi: Sachiko Kokuri (小栗 さちこ, Kokuri Sachiko)
- Mademoiselle Q/Queen: Miyuki Nagato (長門 美雪, Nagato Miyuki) (as 長門 美由樹)

=== Voice cast ===
- Gold-Platinum: Masaki Terasoma (てらそま 昌紀, Terasoma Masaki)
- Jisp: Yūichi Komine (小峰 裕一, Komine Yūichi)
- Narrator: Tsutomu Tareki (垂木 勉, Tareki Tsutomu)

== Songs ==
=== Opening theme ===
- "TRUE DREAM"
  - Lyrics and composition: Kaoru Itō (伊藤 薫, Itō Kaoru)
  - Arrangement: Osamu Totsuya
  - Artist: Tatsuya Maeda

=== Ending theme ===
- "HELLO THERE!"
  - Lyrics and composition: Kaoru Itō
  - Arrangement: Osamu Totsuya
  - Artist: Tatsuya Maeda

== Big Bad Beetleborgs ==
Some Blue SWAT characters have been adapted for Big Bad Beetleborgs:

- The costume for Mademoiselle Q/Queen's monster form was adapted for the episode "Convention Dimension" as Wingar.
- The head from Riga's costume was used in the episode "Space Case" to combine with the partially-repainted body of Muscle from Juukou B-Fighter to form the alien form of Maguirk while the partially-repainted head of Muscle was combined with the body of Synthetic Beast Heavyznake's second form (unused in Big Bad Beetleborgs) to form the alien form of Guirk.

== International Broadcasts and Home Video ==
- In Thailand, the series was released on home video under Blue SWAT Alien Destroyer (หน่วยพิฆาตต่างดาว บลูสวาท) by Video Square with a Thai dub.
- In Indonesia, it aired on RCTI with an Indonesian dub in 2002.
