= Ultraman Dyna =

- Title card
- Genre: Superhero; Tokusatsu; Kaiju; Sci-Fi; Kyodai Hero
- Created by: Tsuburaya Productions
- Developed by: Naoyuki Edo
- Directed by: Kazuya Konaka
- Starring: Takeshi Tsuruno; Ryo Kinomoto; Toshikazu Fukawa; Risa Saito; Takao Kase; Joe Onodera; Mariya Yamada
- Narrated by: Yūji Machi
- Opening theme: "Ultraman Dyna" by Tatsuya Maeda
- Ending theme: "Kimi dake o Mamoritai" by Fumiaki Nakajima; "ULTRA HIGH" by Lazy
- Composer: Tatsumi Yano
- Country of origin: Japan
- Original language: Japanese
- No. of episodes: 51

Production
- Running time: 24 minutes (per episode)
- Production companies: Tsuburaya Productions; Mainichi Broadcasting System

Original release
- Network: JNN (MBS, TBS)
- Release: September 5, 1997 – August 28, 1998

Related
- Ultraman Tiga; Ultraman Gaia

Ultraman Dyna (ウルトラマンダイナ, Urutoraman Daina) is a Japanese tokusatsu TV show which aired from 5 September 1997 until 28 August 1998. It is a direct sequel to the previous Ultraman series, Ultraman Tiga and the ninth entry (thirteenth overall) to the Ultra Series.

== Plot ==
In the year 2017 (seven years after the final episode of Ultraman Tiga), TPC has advanced beyond earth, and has created a new team, "Super GUTS". Humans have begun terraforming Mars and other planets in what is known as the "Age of the Neo Frontier". One day, the Neo Frontier is attacked by an alien race known as the Spheres. Shin Asuka has just joined Super GUTS and is in the middle of training maneuvers above Earth's atmosphere when he and his comrades are attacked. He proves himself in battle and can hold his own against ace pilot Ryo Yukimura. However, his ship is damaged and he ejects, after which he encounters a shining light. It is then that a new giant of light merges with the bewildered Shin, saving his life. When the Spheres enter Mars' atmosphere and merge with the Martian rocks to form monsters, Shin again participates in the battle, now equipped with a mysterious device known as the "Lieflasher". Upon the Sphere's new attack, Shin suddenly transforms into a colossal giant and manages to protect Mars from a group of monsters sent by the Spheres. The members of Super GUTS quickly catch on that this giant being is not Ultraman Tiga, but a new giant of light, "Ultraman Dyna".

The final story arc is rather somber, in contrast to the rest of the series. Dyna/Shin sacrifices themselves to save the Earth from Gransphia, the planet-sized mother form of the Spheres. He was last seen reuniting with his disappeared father and the two decided to continue traveling in-between dimensions. Eleven years after the end of the television series, the movie Mega Monster Battle: Ultra Galaxy establishes Shin's survival, and the Ultraman Saga had him briefly reunited with the rest of the Super GUTS before vanishing.

== Episodes ==
No.	Title	Directed by	Written by	Original release date
1	"A New Light (Part 1)"; Transliteration: "Arata naru Hikari (Zenpen)" (Japanese: 新たなる光 (前編))	Kazuya Konaka	Keiichi Hasegawa	September 6, 1997
2	"A New Light (Part 2)"; Transliteration: "Arata naru Hikari (Kōhen)" (Japanese: 新たなる光 (後編))	Kazuya Konaka	Keiichi Hasegawa	September 13, 1997
3	"Awaken, Asuka!"; Transliteration: "Mezame yo Asuka" (Japanese: 目覚めよアスカ)	Teruyoshi Ishii	Shin Yoshida	September 20, 1997
4	"Battle! The Underground City"; Transliteration: "Kessen! Chichū Toshi" (Japanese: 決戦! 地中都市)	Teruyoshi Ishii	Masakazu Migita	September 27, 1997
5	"Winning Shot"; Transliteration: "Uiningu Shotto" (Japanese: ウイニングショット)	Masaki Harada	Kenji Konuta	October 4, 1997
6	"The Biggest Monster on Earth"; Transliteration: "Chijō Saidai no Kaijū" (Japanese: 地上最大の怪獣)	Masaki Harada	Junki Takegami	October 11, 1997
7	"The Friend in a Box"; Transliteration: "Hako no Naka no Tomodachi" (Japanese: 箱の中のともだち)	Hirochika Muraishi	Hideyuki Kawakami	October 18, 1997
8	"Bao-on Far Away"; Transliteration: "Harukanaru Baōn" (Japanese: 遥かなるバオーン)	Hirochika Muraishi	Ai Ōta	October 25, 1997
9	"Attack of Two Thousand Creatures"; Transliteration: "Nisen-biki no Shūgeki" (Japanese: 二千匹の襲撃)	Teruyoshi Ishii	Keiichi Hasegawa	November 1, 1997
10	"The Forbidden Geoglyph"; Transliteration: "Kindan no Chijōe" (Japanese: 禁断の地上絵)	Teruyoshi Ishii	Masakazu Migita	November 8, 1997
11	"Phantom Planet"; Transliteration: "Maboroshi no Yūsei" (Japanese: 幻の遊星)	Masaki Harada	Hideyuki Kawakami	November 15, 1997
12	"Phantom Thief Himala"; Transliteration: "Kaitō Himara" (Japanese: 怪盗ヒマラ)	Masaki Harada	Ai Ōta	November 22, 1997
13	"Monster Factory"; Transliteration: "Kaijū Kōjō" (Japanese: 怪獣工場)	Tsugumi Kitaura	Hideyuki Kawakami	November 29, 1997
14	"The Lord Who Sleeps on the Moon"; Transliteration: "Tsuki ni Nemuru Haō" (Japanese: 月に眠る覇王)	Tsugumi Kitaura	Kenji Konuta	December 6, 1997
15	"Gentle Target"; Transliteration: "Yasashii Hyōteki" (Japanese: 優しい標的)	Hirochika Muraishi	Keiichi Hasegawa	December 13, 1997
16	"The Fierce Battle! Monster Island"; Transliteration: "Gekitō! Kaijūtō" (Japanese: 激闘! 怪獣島)	Hirochika Muraishi	Hideyuki Kawakami	December 20, 1997
17	"Ghost Spaceship"; Transliteration: "Yūrei Uchūsen" (Japanese: 幽霊宇宙船)	Teruyoshi Ishii	Masakazu Migita	December 27, 1997
18	"The Girls Who Call on Darkness"; Transliteration: "Yami o Yobu Shōjo-tachi" (Japanese: 闇を呼ぶ少女たち)	Teruyoshi Ishii	Keiichi Hasegawa	January 10, 1998
19	"The Phantom Bird"; Transliteration: "Mugen no Tori" (Japanese: 夢幻の鳥)	Masaki Harada	Junki Takegami	January 17, 1998
20	"The Alien Boy"; Transliteration: "Shōnen Uchūjin" (Japanese: 少年宇宙人)	Masaki Harada	Ai Ōta	January 24, 1998
21	"Fever Monster – 3000 Degrees"; Transliteration: "Hatsunetsu Kaijū Sanzen-do" (Japanese: 発熱怪獣3000度)	Tsugumi Kitaura	Kenji Konuta	January 31, 1998
22	"The Soldiers of Tsukuyo"; Transliteration: "Tsukuyo no Heishi" (Japanese: ツクヨの兵士)	Tsugumi Kitaura	Ai Ōta	February 7, 1998
23	"Fortress of Dreams"; Transliteration: "Yume no Toride" (Japanese: 夢のとりで)	Yoshiaki Kobayashi	Shinsuke Onishi	February 14, 1998
24	"Vampire of the Lake"; Transliteration: "Mizuumi no Kyūketsuki" (Japanese: 湖の吸血鬼)	Yoshiaki Kobayashi	Hideyuki Kawakami	February 21, 1998
25	"Clarkov, Come to the Surface! (Part 1)"; Transliteration: "Kurākofu Fujō Sezu! (Zenpen)" (Japanese: 移動要塞(クラーコフ)浮上せず! (前編))	Hirochika Muraishi	Keiichi Hasegawa	February 28, 1998
26	"Clarkov, Come to the Surface! (Part 2)"; Transliteration: "Kurākofu Fujō Sezu! (Kōhen)" (Japanese: 移動要塞(クラーコフ)浮上せず! (後編))	Hirochika Muraishi	Keiichi Hasegawa	March 7, 1998
27	"Monster Game"; Transliteration: "Kaijū Gēmu" (Japanese: 怪獣ゲーム)	Takashi Kodama	Shin Yoshida	March 14, 1998
28	"Forest of the Ape-Man"; Transliteration: "Enjin no Mori" (Japanese: 猿人の森)	Takashi Kodama	Junki Takegami	March 21, 1998
29	"In the Light of Fate"; Transliteration: "Unmei no Hikari no Naka de" (Japanese: 運命の光の中で)	Tsugumi Kitaura	Shin Yoshida	March 28, 1998
30	"Invasion Scenario"; Transliteration: "Shinryaku no Shinario" (Japanese: 侵略の脚本(シナリオ))	Tsugumi Kitaura	Hideyuki Kawakami	April 4, 1998
31	"Battle to Death! Dyna vs. Dyna"; Transliteration: "Shitō! Daina Bāsasu Daina" (Japanese: 死闘！ダイナVSダイナ)	Masaki Harada	Takahiko Masuda	April 11, 1998
32	"The Singing Exploration Robot"; Transliteration: "Utau Tansa Robotto" (Japanese: 歌う探査ロボット)	Masaki Harada	Masakazu Migita	April 18, 1998
33	"Star of Peace"; Transliteration: "Heiwa no Hoshi" (Japanese: 平和の星)	Kazuya Konaka	Keiichi Hasegawa	April 25, 1998
34	"The Time of Decision"; Transliteration: "Ketsudan no Toki" (Japanese: 決断の時)	Kazuya Konaka	Shin Yoshida	May 2, 1998
35	"The Uncanny Smile (Part 1)"; Transliteration: "Horobi no Bishō (Zenpen)" (Japanese: 滅びの微笑 (前編))	Hirochika Muraishi	Keiichi Hasegawa	May 9, 1998
36	"The Uncanny Smile (Part 2)"; Transliteration: "Horobi no Bishō (Kōhen)" (Japanese: 滅びの微笑 (後編))	Hirochika Muraishi	Keiichi Hasegawa	May 16, 1998
37	"Yumenokatamari"; Transliteration: "Yumenokatamari" (Japanese: ユメノカタマリ)	Mitsunori Hattori	Sadayuki Murai	May 23, 1998
38	"Monster Drama"; Transliteration: "Kaijū Gikyoku" (Japanese: 怪獣戯曲)	Akio Jissoji	Sadayuki Murai	May 30, 1998
39	"The Light and Shadows of Youth"; Transliteration: "Seishun no Hikari to Kage" (Japanese: 青春の光と影)	Takashi Kodama	Shin Yoshida	June 6, 1998
40	"Tree of Jagila"; Transliteration: "Jagira no Ki" (Japanese: ジャギラの樹)	Takashi Kodama	Gaku Roppongi	June 13, 1998
41	"We Want to See Our Earth"; Transliteration: "Boku-tachi no Chikyū ga Mitai" (Japanese: ぼくたちの地球が見たい)	Kyōta Kawasaki	Ai Ōta	June 20, 1998
42	"A Vanishing Dream"; Transliteration: "Utakata no Sorayume" (Japanese: うたかたの空夢)	Kyōta Kawasaki	Kyōta Kawasaki	June 27, 1998
43	"Captain Long-Legs"; Transliteration: "Ashinaga Taichō" (Japanese: あしなが隊長)	Hirochika Muraishi	Masakazu Migita	July 4, 1998
44	"Venus Snow"; Transliteration: "Kinsei no Yuki" (Japanese: 金星の雪)	Hirochika Muraishi	Keiichi Hasegawa	July 11, 1998
45	"Churasa's Tears"; Transliteration: "Churasa no Namida" (Japanese: チュラサの涙)	Toshiyuki Takano	Shōzō Uehara	July 18, 1998
46	"The Power of Love"; Transliteration: "Kimi o Omō Chikara" (Japanese: 君を想う力)	Masaki Harada	Masakazu Migita	July 25, 1998
47	"Farewell, Hanejiro"; Transliteration: "Saraba Hanejirō" (Japanese: さらばハネジロー)	Masaki Harada	Hideyuki Kawakami	August 1, 1998
48	"N'damoshite X"; Transliteration: "Ndamoshite Ekkusu" (Japanese: ンダモシテX)	Tsugumi Kitaura	Masakazu Migita & Junki Takegami	August 8, 1998
49	"Final Chapter I: A New Shadow"; Transliteration: "Saishūshō Wan Arata naru Kage" (Japanese: 最終章I 新たなる影)	Kazuya Konaka	Keiichi Hasegawa	August 15, 1998
50	"Final Chapter II: Destruction of the Solar System"; Transliteration: "Saishūshō Tsū Taiyōkei Shōmetsu" (Japanese: 最終章II 太陽系消滅)	Kazuya Konaka	Keiichi Hasegawa	August 22, 1998
51	"Final Chapter III: To Tomorrow…"; Transliteration: "Saishūshō Surī Ashita e" (Japanese: 最終章III 明日へ…)	Kazuya Konaka	Keiichi Hasegawa	August 29, 1998

== Films ==
- Ultraman Tiga & Ultraman Dyna: Warriors of the Star of Light (1998): Ultraman Dyna was one of the main Ultramen to appear in this movie (as events of the movie are set during times of the Dyna series). Ultraman Tiga also makes an important appearance.
- Ultraman Tiga & Ultraman Dyna & Ultraman Gaia: Battle in Hyperspace (1999)
- Ultraman Dyna: Return of Hanejiro (2001): An original video release that serves as a sequel to episode 47 of the series.
- Mega Monster Battle: Ultra Galaxy (2009): Ultraman Dyna appears in this movie alongside the Showa-Era Ultramen, Ultraman Mebius, and the ZAP SPACY crew from Ultra Galaxy Mega Monster Battle. His storyline follows on directly from the finale of his series.
- Ultraman Saga (2012): Ultraman Dyna is the main Ultraman in the movie (set after the events of Ultra Galaxy Legend and Dyna has travelled to another universe), joined Ultraman Zero and Ultraman Cosmos in this movie, and merges with Zero and Cosmos to become Ultraman Saga.

== Other appearances ==
- Superior Ultraman 8 Brothers (2008): Ultraman Dyna joined Ultraman Tiga, Ultraman Gaia and Ultraman Mebius in this movie, alongside Showa-era Ultra Heroes.
- Ultraman Ginga S: Showdown! Ultra 10 Warriors!! (2015): Ultraman Dyna is one of the Heisei-era Ultra Heroes to fight along with other 9 Heisei-era Ultra Heroes.
- Ultraman Orb: The Origin Saga (2016-2017): Ultraman Dyna joined Ultraman Orb, Ultraman Cosmos, Ultraman Gaia and Ultraman Agul.
- Ultraman Decker (2022): Ultraman Dyna first appeared as a flashback and later joined Ultraman Decker.
- Ultraman Decker Finale: Journey to Beyond (2023): Ultraman Dyna arrived on Planet Lavie at some point during his travels, as it was being ravaged by aliens sent by Gibellus. After dealing with the immediate threats, Dyna turned to the planet native, Dinas, to give her some of his light. This caused a reaction with her will that created Ultraman Dinas. The two liberated the planet from the rest of the invaders together before Dyna left to continue travelling and protect more civilizations.

== Cast ==
- Shin Asuka (アスカ・シン, Asuka Shin): Takeshi Tsuruno (つるの 剛士, Tsuruno Takeshi)
- Gousuke Hibiki (ヒビキ・ゴウスケ, Hibiki Gōsuke): Ryo Kinomoto (木之元 亮, Kinomoto Ryō)
- Toshiyuki Kouda (コウダ・トシユキ, Kōda Toshiyuki): Toshikazu Fukawa (布川 敏和, Fukawa Toshikazu)
- Ryo Yumimura (ユミムラ・リョウ, Yumimura Ryō): Risa Saito (斉藤 りさ, Saitō Risa)
- Kouhei Kariya (カリヤ・コウヘイ, Kariya Kōhei): Takao Kase (加瀬 尊朗, Kase Takao)
- Tsutomu Nakajima (ナカジマ・ツトム, Nakajima Tsutomu): Joe Onodera (小野寺 丈, Onodera Jō)
- Mai Midorikawa (ミドリカワ・マイ, Midorikawa Mai): Mariya Yamada (山田 まりや, Yamada Mariya)
- Kouki Fukami (フカミ・コウキ, Fukami Kōki): Toshiaki Amada (天田 俊明, Amada Toshiaki)
- Seiji Miyata (ミヤタ・セイジ, Miyata Seiji): Hiroshi Tsuburaya (円谷 浩, Tsuburaya Hiroshi)
- Kihachi Gondou (ゴンドウ・キハチ, Gondō Kihachi): Shinobu Kameyama (亀山 忍, Kameyama Shinobu)
- Saeko Shiina (シイナ・サエコ, Shiina Saeko): Yasumi Maezawa (前沢 保美, Maezawa Yasumi)
- Kazuma Asuka (アスカ・カズマ, Asuka Kazuma): Daisuke Ryu (隆 大介, Ryū Daisuke)
- Masami Mishina (ミシナ・マサミ, Mishina Masami): Edo Yamaguchi (エド山口)

=== Voice cast ===
- Narrator: Yūji Machi (真地 勇志, Machi Yūji)

=== Guest cast ===
- Kurea Nebula Alien "Shion" (クレア星雲人 シオン, Kurea Seiunjin Shion; 15): Masaru Shishido (宍戸 マサル, Shishido Masaru)
- Takuma (拓磨; 19): Takuma Aoki (青木 拓磨, Aoki Takuma)
- Mayumi Shinjoh (シンジョウ・マユミ, Shinjō Mayumi; 19, 38): Kei Ishibashi (石橋 けい, Ishibashi Kei)
- Satoru Kishi (岸悟 役, Kishi Satoru; 20): Hiromi Sakimoto (崎本大海, Sakimoto)
- Toko Ayano (綾野塔子博士 役, Ayano Toko; 22): Hairi Katagiri (片桐 はいり, Katagiri Hairi)
- Officer Fujikura (フジクラ隊員, Fujikura-taiin; 23): Keiichi Wada (和田 圭市, Wada Keiichi)
- Chief Komatsu (チーフ・コマツ, Chīfu Komatsu; 24): Shun Ueda (うえだ 峻, Ueda Shun)
- Taichi (太一少年 役, Taichi; 27): Yuta Kanai (金井勇太, Kanai Yuta)
- Masaki Akechi (明智 正輝, Akechi Masaki; 27), Gōda (豪田; 27): Hiroshi Watari (渡 洋史, Watari Hiroshi)
- Sōichiro Sawai (サワイ・ソウイチロウ, Sawai Sōichirō; 33, 51): Tamio Kawachi (川地 民夫, Kawachi Tamio)
- Tetsuji Yoshioka (ヨシオカ・テツジ, Yoshioka Tetsuji; 33): Ken Okabe (岡部 健, Okabe Ken)
- Helio Power Plant engineer (34): Daisuke Ban (伴 大介, Ban Daisuke)
- Director Hinoda (35, 36) : Jinya Sato (佐藤仁哉, Sato Jinya)
- Seiichi Munakata (ムナカタ・セイイチ, Munakata Seiichi; 34, 36, 42): Akitoshi Ohtaki (大滝 明利, Ōtaki Akitoshi)
- Tetsuo Shinjoh (シンジョウ・テツオ, Shinjō Tetsuo; 35, 36, 42): Shigeki Kagemaru (影丸 茂樹, Kagemaru Shigeki)
- Masami Horii (ホリイ・マサミ, Horii Masami; 35, 36, 42): Yukio Masuda (増田 由紀夫, Masuda Yukio)
- Megumi Iruma (イルマ・メグミ, Iruma Megumi; 36, 49, 52): Mio Takaki (高樹 澪, Takaki Mio)
- Masayuki Nahara (ナハラ・マサユキ, Nahara Masayuki; 36, 42): Uketa Take (タケ・ウケタ, Take Uketa)
- Hiroya Narumi (鳴海浩也, Narumi Hiroya; 38): Koji Shimizu (清水弘治, Shimizu Koji)
- Rena Yanase (ヤナセ・レナ, Yanase Rena; 42, 50): Takami Yoshimoto (吉本 多香美, Yoshimoto Takami)
- Chief Mukai (ムカイ班長, Mukai-hanchō; 43): Eiichi Kikuchi (きくち 英一, Kikuchi Eiichi)
- Shin Hayate (ハヤテ・シン, Hayate Shin; 48): Masaki Kyomoto (京本 政樹, Kyōmoto Masaki)
- Daigo Madoka (マドカ・ダイゴ, Madoka Daigo; 50, 51): Hiroshi Nagano (長野 博, Nagano Hiroshi)
- Jun Yazumi (ヤズミ・ジュン, Yazumi Jun; 50): Yoichi Furuya (古屋 暢一, Furuya Yōichi)
- Rui Kisaragi (キサラギ・ルイ, Kisaragi Rui; 50): Aya Sugimoto (杉本 彩, Sugimoto Aya)

== Songs ==
Opening theme

- "Ultraman Dyna" (ウルトラマンダイナ, Urutoraman Daina)
  - Lyrics: Gorō Matsui (松井 五郎, Matsui Gorō)
  - Composition: Kisaburō Suzuki (鈴木 キサブロー, Suzuki Kisaburō)
  - Arrangement: Tatsumi Yano (矢野 立美, Yano Tatsumi)
  - Artist: Tatsuya Maeda (前田 達也, Maeda Tatsuya)

Ending themes

- "Kimi dake o Mamoritai" (君だけを守りたい; "You Alone I Want to Protect")
  - Lyrics & Composition: Toshihiko Takamizawa (高見沢 俊彦, Takamizawa Toshihiko)
  - Arrangement: Akira Inoue (井上 鑑, Inoue Akira)
  - Artist: Fumiaki Nakajima (中島 文明, Nakajima Fumiaki)
  - Episodes: 1-26, 35, 50
- "ULTRA HIGH"
  - Lyrics, Composition, Arrangement, & Artist: Lazy
  - Episodes: 27–34, 37–49, 51
- "Brave Love, TIGA (Instrumental Version)"
  - Composition: BarbeQ Wasada (バーベQ和佐田, Bābekyū Wasada)
  - Arrangement: Yasuhiko Fukuda (福田 裕彦, Fukuda Yasuhiko)
  - Episodes: 36

Insert & image themes

- "Take off!! Super GUTS" (Take off!! スーパーGUTS, Taiku Ofu!! Sūpā Gattsu)
  - Lyrics: Kumiko Aoki (青木 久美子, aoki Kumiko)
  - Composition & Arrangement: Toshihiko Sahashi (佐橋 俊彦, Sahashi Toshihiko)
  - Artist: Night Scats (ナイトスキャッツ, Naito Sukyattsu) (Peeka-Boo (ピーカブー, Pīkabū), Etsurō Wakakonai (若子内 悦郎, Wakakonai Etsurō), MoJo)
  First used in episode 1.
- "LOVE & PEACE"
  - Lyrics & Composition: Fumiaki Nakajima
  - Arrangement: Fumiaki Nakajima, Youtenji hiromi (祐天寺 浩美, Yūtenji Hiromi)
  - Artist: Fumiaki Nakajima with Sara & Rei
  Unused in the series.
- "EVERYBODY WANTS LOVE"
  - Lyrics, Composition, Arrangement, & Artist: Lazy
  Unused in the series.
- "Miracle no Kaze ni Nare" (ミラクルの風になれ, Mirakuru no Kaze ni Nare; "Become a Miracle Wind")
  - Lyrics: Gorō Matsui
  - Composition: Kisaburō Suzuki
  - Arrangement: Mitsuhiro Tada (タダ ミツヒロ, Tada Mitsuhiro)
  - Artist: Fumikazu Miyashita (宮下 文一, Miyashita Fumikazu)
  - Episodes: 9
- "Dyna no Akai Kagayaki ni" (ダイナの赤い輝きに, Daina no Akai Kagayaki ni; "To the Red Glow of Dyna")
  - Lyrics: Gorō Matsui
  - Composition: Kisaburō Suzuki
  - Arrangement: Toshihiko Sahashi
  - Artist: Shinichi Ishihara (石原 慎一, Ishihara Shin'ichi)
  - Episodes: 24
- "Ima koso Flash" (いまこそフラッシュ, Ima koso Furasshu; "Now It's a Flash")
  - Lyrics: Gorō Matsui
  - Composition: Kisaburō Suzuki
  - Arrangement: Tatsumi Yano
  - Artist: Tatsuya Maeda
  - Episodes: 35

== Ultraman Decker ==
To celebrate the 25th anniversary of the series, Tsuburaya released the sequel of Ultraman Trigger: New Generation Tiga titled Ultraman Decker (ウルトラマンデッカー, Urutoraman Dekkā), serving as a modern reimagining of the original series.

== Home media ==
In July 2020, Shout! Factory announced to have struck a multi-year deal with Alliance Entertainment and Mill Creek Entertainment, with the blessings of Tsuburaya and Indigo, that granted them the exclusive SVOD and AVOD digital rights to the Ultra series and films (1,100 TV episodes and 20 films) acquired by Mill Creek the previous year. Ultraman Dyna, amongst other titles, will stream in the United States and Canada through Shout! Factory TV and Tokushoutsu.
