= List of Ultraman Gaia characters =

This is the character page for the 1998-1999 tokusatsu Ultra Series Ultraman Gaia.

== Protagonists ==
=== Gamu Takayama ===
Gamu Takayama (高山 我夢, Takayama Gamu) is the main character and hailed from Chiba Prefecture. Aged 20 years old, he was a member of Alchemy Stars, and obtained a doctorate in Quantum physics at the age of 17. Back in his childhood days, Gamu was usually ostracized by other children due to his exceptional intelligence but he does have a pure heart, choosing not to provoke a fight and is on good terms with several people he has met.

At the beginning of the series, Gamu enrolled in the Quantum Physics Laboratory of Jonan University and met Ultraman Gaia in an experiment to discover the will of the Earth. During C.O.V.'s invasion, he was bestowed with Gaia's light to fight against the monster and was hired as the XIG's analyzer. His XIG Fighter possesses a remote control system that allowed him to transform without raising suspicions. While fighting as Gaia, Gamu always found himself clashing with an Alchemy Stars deserter Fujimiya, who gained the ability to transform into Agul. Their connection caused him to be fired from XIG in episode 23 until he was hired again under Commander Ishimuro's wishes. Gamu accidentally revealed his identity as Gaia, and Fujimiya's identity as well, to his XIG teammates when he was witnessing Agul's defeat by Zebubu. After Gaia and Agul's defeat by Zogu, Gamu and Fujimiya's identities were exposed worldwide and he briefly regained the ability to transform to fight against her. In the aftermath of the battle, Gamu resumed his life as a university student. In Once Again Gaia, Gamu was given the position of an irregular soldier when briefly joining the XIG again. His encounter with Rinar provided him the power to transform into Gaia again and fight against Gakuzom.

Despite his excellence in the scientific field, Gamu is shown to be weak in terms of physical fitness and eventually trains harder as the series progresses to keep up Gaia's performance. This becomes essential when Gaia received the light of Agul as it needed a stronger body to catch up with the increase of power. In The Battle In Hyperspace, Gamu's favorite book is the Irish novel Gulliver's Travels, being the source of his inspiration in Quantum physics. His main transformation device is the Esplender (エスプレンダー, Esupurendā), lifting it upwards when transforming into Ultraman Gaia.

Gamu Takayama is portrayed by Takeshi Yoshioka (吉岡 毅志, Yoshioka Takeshi) and Jun Masuo (増尾 遵, Masuo Jun) in his childhood. The setting of Gamu is supposedly to be a "boy genius", but Takeshi is able to portray him in several feats. Takeshi himself overjoyed when he was able to reprise Gamu in a separate work, Superior Ultraman 8 Brothers, although Gamu in said movie is portrayed as a separate iteration to the original television series.

=== Hiroya Fujimiya ===
Hiroya Fujimiya (藤宮 博也, Fujimiya Hiroya) is the 22 year old Alchemy Star deserter, serving as both rival and senior to Gamu. (Note: In episode 23, his birthdate is October 21, 1979.) He spent his time searching for answers to counter the threat of Radical Destruction Bringer through the prediction of Chrisis and was eventually bestowed with the light of Agul, three years before Gamu obtained Gaia's light.

Having been deceived by Chrisis that humanity would be Earth's destroyer, Fujimiya deserted the Alchemy Stars and became a wanted person in the eyes of G.U.A.R.D. His point of view usually clashed with the more idealistic Gamu, which gradually became an intense rivalry. He also met the KCB reporter, Reiko on various occasions. With the death of his colleague Kyoko Inamori, he reached his breaking point and this led to him awakening various monsters from around the Earth via Agul's power. With the advent of Zoruim and Gamu revealing that his supercomputer Chrisis was long ago hacked, Fujimiya descended into the point of breakdown, surrendering Agul's light to Gamu before seemingly vanishing in an explosion from a fireball. Although surviving the attack, Fujimiya tried multiple times to attack the Radical Destruction Bringer with his own resources before he fell into despair and became near suicidal. At the time of Gamu's capture by Σ-Zuiguru, Fujimiya regained both his will and Agul's light to save his comrade, eventually leading him to join forces with Gamu. His identity as Agul was accidentally exposed by Gamu after witnessing his defeat by Zebubu, simultaneously revealing his identity as Gaia to the XIG members. After losing Agul's light to Zogu, Fujimiya's Chrisis was put to use by G.U.A.R.D. as they briefly restore the Ultras' powers for a counterattack. In the epilogue, Fujimiya left for parts unknown while wearing bright clothes and smiling.

In Once Again Gaia, Fujimiya once again went on the run from G.U.A.R.D. after attempts to lure Zonnel away from an urban area went awry. While hiding, he met Melissa, a Rinar who restore Agul's light to the Agulater.

Although he is not affiliated to any group, Fujimiya is rich enough to own a private jet and was seen twice riding a motorcycle. (Note: Said private jet is made from a modified prop of Rockwell B-1 Lancer.) Agul's light is stored within the Agulater (アグレイター, Agureitā), a brace worn on the right arm which spins 180 degree before opening up its wing-like appendage to reveal Agul's light. In Once Again Gaia, Fujimiya held the device directly on his hand and transform in a similar manner to Gamu with his Esplender. He can also channel Agul's power, such as moving in a blinding speed to evade G.U.A.R.D. troops and break into the Geo Base.

Hiroya Fujimiya is portrayed by Hassei Takano (高野 八誠, Takano Hassei), who in real life is married to Yukari Ishida, Reiko Yoshii's actor in the same series. In Superior Ultraman 8 Brothers, both of their characters' alternate iterations were portrayed as a married couple with their real life daughter on the set.

=== Tsutomu Niiboshi ===
Tsutomu Niiboshi (新星 勉, Niiboshi Tsutomu) is the main character of The Battle in Hyperspace.

A boy whose grades failing from addiction to Ultramen, his encounter with Lisa allowed him to bring Gamu to his universe but accidentally set forth the motion of events. During King of Mons' rampage, Tsutomu was able to wish for Tiga and Dyna's arrival to assist Gaia and turn the tables of the battle. Although having wished for the Red sphere (and Lisa)'s nonexistence, he met Lisa as a normal girl in the repeated day as they became fast friends.

Tsutomu Niiboshi is portrayed by Gaku Hamada (濱田 岳, Hamada Gaku).

=== Lisa Nanase ===
Lisa Nanase (七瀬 リサ, Nanase Risa) is one of the characters of The Battle in Hyperspace.

She is the interface of Red Sphere (赤い球, Akai Tama), a device created by mankind from another world but sought a person that could wish its nonexistence after the dangerous potential it held. Arriving on Tsutomu's world, she developed an interest on the boy and allowed him to wish for Gamu's existence to their world. Unfortunately, it also fell into the hands of Hiroshi Kashimada, who wished Satan Bizor to their world as well. After being sent back to his world, Gamu decided to return after being visited by Lisa's vision. With Hiroshi and his friends influenced by the Red sphere's power, they created King of Mons as a result until Tsutomu knock them back to their senses and Gaia arrived. Tsutomu would later wish for Tiga and Dyna before wishing for the ball to exist. Despite its nonexistence and the event was reset, Lisa appeared as a normal girl who was transferred to Tsutomu's class as they quickly became friends.

Lisa Nanase is portrayed by Mai Saitō (斉藤 麻衣, Saitō Mai) and voiced by Nana Yamaguchi (山口 奈々, Yamaguchi Nana) as the Red Sphere. Director Kazuya Konaka mentioned that the Red Sphere's took the appearance of Lisa from a girl who Tsutomu would meet in the future (who he met at the last scene of the movie), making Tsutomu's image as "protector of the future". He also envisioned the Red Sphere's role based on Brainwave Monster Gango (脳波怪獣 ギャンゴ, Nōha Kaijū Gyango) from Ultraman and due to this, a lot of comedic elements were placed in the movie's plot.

== XIG ==
XIG (シグ, Shigu; eXpanded Interceptive Guardians) is a group of elite members of G.U.A.R.D. which act as the forefront in against Radical Destruction Bringer. Their main base of operation is the Aerial Base, later on relocated to Geo Base after its destruction by Mokian as part of a Kamikaze attack.

Operation Crew

Operation Crew (オペレーション・クルー, Operēshon Kurū): The main operating team which provides plans and strategies. Their main base of operation is the Aerial Base's command room.

- Akio Ishimuro (石室 章雄, Ishimuro Akio): The XIG commander, aged 45 years old. He is capable of understanding the capabilities of other officers and at the same time trying to uncover the true intention of Radical Destruction Bringer. He is well aware of Gamu's true identity as Gaia but kept it to himself until XIG's migration to Geo Base after Mokian's assault. His family consist of his wife and a son. He is portrayed by Hiroyuki Watanabe (渡辺 裕之, Watanabe Hiroyuki).
- Seiichiro Tsutsumi (堤 誠一郎, Tsutsumi Seiichirō): Aged 33 years old, he was previously the lieutenant of an air force. Aside from being the field commander, he also assist the pilots in the field by piloting the Peace Carry. Because of his weakness for children, he assigns the role of tour guide to Gamu in episode 40 during a school tour in Aerial Base. He is portrayed by Takashi Ukaji (宇梶 剛士, Ukaji Takashi).
- Atsuko Sasaki (佐々木 敦子, Sasaki Atsuko): An excellent operator in the command room. Aged 21, she previously harbored an admiration for Kajio of Team Lightning but stepped down due to his relationship with her sister. Despite her dark past as a child, she has a bright personality and slowly develop feelings for Gamu despite being initially cold towards him, to the point of acting as an elder sister figure. She is portrayed by Ai Hashimoto (橋本 愛, Hashimoto Ai) and Arisa Suzuki (鈴木 亜里咲, Suzuki Arisa) as a child.
- Georgie Leland (ジョジー・リーランド, Jojī Rīrando): A 20 year old half Australian operator. Aside from her job, she is also an expert in printed circuit board and keeps a black cat as a pet. Compared to Atsuko's cold outlook, Georgie is friendlier with Gamu and sometimes went out with him. Despite her interest to get married, she has yet to get a boyfriend. She is portrayed by Maria Theresa Gow (マリア・テレサ・ガウ, Maria Teresa Gau).
- Saika Ukai (鵜飼 彩香, Ukai Saika): A fill-in operator during Atsuko or Georgie's absence, wearing a different uniform. She almost lacking an expression and worked alongside the two when XIG were relocated to Geo Base. She is portrayed by Saika Tanaka (田中 彩佳, Tanaka Saika).

Fighter Teams

- Team Lightning (チーム・ライトニング, Chīmu Raitoningu): An air force team organized by young ace pilots, having the largest number of times of exercise and as such called "Top Guns" during their early days in defense force.
  - Katsumi Kajio (梶尾 克美, Kajio Katsumi): Aged 24 years old and the leader of Team Lightning. As Gamu was a student who quickly enlisted into XIG, Kajio shows initial dissatisfaction in the rookie but grew acceptance to him, even portraying as an older brother-like figure. Despite his pride and overconfidence, Kajio is not good in socializing and rarely talks with people when outside missions. Despite his proficiency in piloting, Kajio has a poor aiming skills, which eventually improved in episode 34. As of Psycho Mezard II's assault, he is dating Ritsuko, Atsuko's sister. He is portrayed by Masami Nakagami (中上 雅巳, Nakagami Masami).
  - Yasushi Kitada (北田 靖, Kitada Yasushi): Aged 23 years old. Despite his delicate appearance, his body and mind are well trained. Although he usually provides Kajio with advises, Kitada is prone to crashes and is more interested in Gamu. He is portrayed by Katsuhiko Hasegawa (長谷川 勝彦, Hasegawa Katsuhiko).
  - Satoshi Ohgawara (大河原 聡志, Ōgawara Satoshi): Aged 25 years old. Although being the oldest of the team member, he has a respect for his leader Kajio. Alongside Kitada, he is usually prone to crashed and often gets scold by Kajio. Since Gaia occasionally saves him during crashes, Ohgawara labels him as a friend, which caused trouble for him when he was forced to attack the Ultra's own impostor, Meemos. He is portrayed by Yusuke Sawaki (沢木 祐介, Sawaki Yūsuke).
- Team Falcon (チーム・ファルコン, Chīmu Farukon): An air force team of veteran pilots. The way of fighting by making use of veteran teamwork also surpasses Team Lightning. During Aeroviper's assault, the team gets to watch a future where Aerial Base was destroyed, with the only way to save it is for the team to sacrifice their lives. After Gamu trails them into the past, they were able to destroy said monster and therefore negated its own existence.
  - Tatsuhiko Yoneda (米田 達彦, Yoneda Tatsuhiko): Aged 34 years old and is the Team Falcon's leader. Due to his experience in the defense force, he gains complete trust from Tsutsumi, although he believes that young pilots should obtain more attention. Unlike Kajio, Yoneda is willing to receive advice from Gamu during tactical missions. In Once Again Gaia, Yoneda picks Gamu from his university to assist XIG in Gakzom's attack. He is portrayed by Kuronosuke Kagawa (賀川 黒之助, Kagawa Kuronosuke).
  - Koichi Hayashi (林 幸市, Hayashi Kōichi): Aged 33 years old, he was Kajio's senior during the era of defense force. He was portrayed by Shogo Shiotani (塩谷 庄吾, Shiotani Shōgo).
  - Toru Tsukamoto (塚守 亨, Tsukamoto Tōru): Aged 32 years old. He is portrayed by Shin Ishikawa (石川 真, Ishikawa Shin), who would portray Kazuya Serizawa in Ultraman Mebius.
- Team Crow (チーム・クロウ, Chīmu Kurō): An all-women fighter team whose first deployment was against C.O.V. II. They are known for their penchant of rock and sometimes use sign language during formation attacks.
  - Miho Inagi (稲城 美穂, Inagi Miho): Aged 26 years old and the team leader. She was known for being the first female pilot back in her days in the defense force and hides her caring side under an overconfident outlook. She is portrayed by Tomoko Kawashima (川嶋 朋子, Kawashima Tomoko).
  - Julie Mishima (三島 樹莉, Mishima Juri): Aged 24 years old and speaks in Hiroshima accent. Initially a test pilot of an American aircraft engineer, she was transferred due to her passion for machines. She is also knowledgeable in fighter jets due to her background. She is portrayed by Izumi Matsuda (松田 いずみ, Matsuda Izumi).
  - Kei Tadano (多田野 彗, Tadano Kei): Aged 22 years old, she is a pilot whose rumored to have overcome an unknown trauma in the past. From her team members, she is the one who brought a cassette player which plays rock music and harbors feelings for Yoneda of Team Falcon. She is portrayed by Kei Ishibashi (石橋 けい, Ishibashi Kei), who previously portray Mayumi Shinjo in Ultraman Tiga and Ultraman Dyna.

Other teams

- Team Hercules (チーム・ハーキュリーズ, Chīmu Hākyurīzu): A team consist of physically athletic cadets which specializes in terrestrial combat. Despite having the fewest missions, their participation are usually successful.
  - Satoru Yoshida (吉田 悟, Yoshida Satoru): Aged 30 years old and leader of Team Hercules. Although he is a thoughtful person, there are also times when acts stubborn. He has affinity for extinct animals and had a childhood friend who calls him Yocchan (ヨッちゃん). He is portrayed by Masaru Matsuda (松田 優, Matsuda Masaru).
  - Takanobu Kuwabara (桑原 孝信, Kuwabara Takanobu): Aged 28 years old. The most physically fit among his teammates and usually took Gamu's advice. His cousin in episode 34 is a wrestler who trains under Shinya Hashimoto. He is portrayed by Koji Nakamura (中村 浩二, Nakamura Kōji).
  - Mitsugu Shima (志摩 貢, Shima Mitsugu): Aged 35 years old. He came up with the nickname "chewing gum" for Gamu and accompanies him on a mission to track Algona's egg. Team leader Yoshida as well called Gamu "chewing gum" in episode 50. He is portrayed by Kei Kagaya (加賀谷 圭, Kagaya Kei).
- Team Seagull (チーム・シーガル, Chīmu Shīgaru): A team which specializes in natural disasters and rescues during attacks instigated by Radical Destruction Bringer.
  - Atsushi Koyama (神山 篤志, Kōyama Atsushi): Aged 28 years old and the team leader. When working alone, he acts as the pilot of Peace Carry alongside chief Tsutsumi and often wears sunglasses. He has been working in rescue missions since 18 years old and guide his team member Renji. He is portrayed by Shunsuke Gondo (権藤 俊輔, Gondō Shunsuke).
  - Renji Matsuo (松尾 蓮二, Matsuo Renji): Aged 25 years old. He studied under Koyama's guidance and is usually shy around people. He is portrayed by Tomu Saeba (冴場 都夢, Saeba Tomu).
  - Michael Simmons (マイクル・シモンズ, Maikuru Shimonzu): Aged 27 years old and a native from Colorado. He previously worked as a helicopter pilot back in his days as an American rescue team member. He is portrayed by Samuel Pop Aning (サムエル・ポップ・エニング, Samueru Poppu Eningu)
- Team Marlin (チーム・マーリン, Chīmu Mārin): A team specializes in ocean warfare. Since not much of threats came from the sea, they possess two sortie records, one was during the series' run and the second on Once Again Gaia. Their name derives from Marlin, a type of fish and often mistaken as "Marine" due to their operational environment.
  - Katsutoshi Yokotani (横谷 勝歳, Yokotani Katsutoshi): Aged 28 years old and Team Marlin's leader. He is a designer of submarines who had engaged in various marine projects in several countries, including the XIG's Siren 7500. Although shows hostility for Gamu, he is friendly towards his teammates. He is portrayed by Tetsuro Shoji (庄司 哲郎, Shōji Tetsurō).
  - Gentaro Imai (今井 源太郎, Imai Gentarō): Aged 25 years old. He was a marine biologist and geologist from Marine Defense Center. In the OV, he provided Gamu with various explanations. He is portrayed by Hiroaki Irisawa (入沢 宏彰, Irisawa Hiroaki).
  - Kingo Iwao (厳 均悟, Iwao Kingo): Aged 32 years old. Despite being a hyperactive person, he is usually quiet during missions. His membership in XIG was suggested by his leader Yokotani, who scouted him during his time as a crew of a private submarine boat. He is portrayed by Naoyuki Yokoyama (横山 尚之, Yokoyama Naoyuki).

Arsenal

- XIG Converts (XIGコンバーツ, Shigu Konbātsu): Standard operating uniforms for XIG members.
- XIG Met (XIGメット, Shigu Metto): A helmet with built-in high performance digital camera. Despite being lightweight, the helmet is very durable. Depending on the team, each have different color schemes.
- Jector Gun (ジェクターガン, Jekutā Gan): A high performance laser gun which fires different HYPOP ammunitions, including heat ray and anesthesia.
- XIG Vulcan (XIGバルカン, Shigu Barukan): A "though weapon" which can fire destructive energy bullets by simultaneously loading three HYPOP bullets. As it is a heavy equipment, Team Hercules frequently using the weapon.
- XIG-NAVI: A small high-performance computer worn on the left wrist. Although possessing various functions, it was mainly used for communication. In Ultraman Orb: The Origin Saga, Gamu can also warp himself with a Repulsor Lift bubble to escape.
- Mobile Machine (モバイルマシン, Mobairu Mashin): Gamu's handmade personal high performance mobile, which allows him to use the line freely.

Mechas

Due to cooperation with Alchemy Stars, the mechas of XIG were comparably beyond the normal standards of science, being developed with greater attack power against monster attacks and Radical Destruction Bringer. Since members of XIG are all experts, the versatility was made to be limited and focuses more on execution missions.

- Peace Carry (ピースキャリー, Pīsu Kyarī): XIG's largest mecha, which functions as a carrier if the operation place is faraway. The pilot is usually Koyama, while the passenger seat is usually ridden by Tsutsumi or Gamu. Serving its function as a carrier, it can carry three Container Mechas and has twin cannons on its nose.
- Container Mecha (コンテナメカ, Kontena Meka): Mechas used by XIG members, kept in a form of 8 m-long containers. Once deployed, they can easily fold into their respective vehicles, either from the Aerial Base or the Peace Carry.
  - XIG Fighter SS (XIGファイターSS(スカイサーファー), Shigu Faitā Esu Esu (Sukai Sāfā)): Fighter team leader's jet, colored blue and labelled as Fighter 1 (ファイター1, Faitā Wan). Flying with the Repulsor Lift technology, its main arsenal is missiles and occasionally hyperspace destroying bullets.
  - XIG Fighter SG (XIGファイターSG(スカイゲイナー), Shigu Faitā Esu Jī (Sukai Geinā)): Red-colored fighter jets that are labelled as Fighter 2 (ファイター2, Faitā Tsū) and Fighter 3 (ファイター3, Faitā Surī) for the use of other fighter team members. Aside from HEAT Missiles (HEATミサイル, Hīto Misairu), it can also be equipped with bombs or liquid nitrogen bullets. Should the aircraft gets attacked, the pilots can use the ejector seat to escape.
  - XIG Fighter EX (XIGファイターEX(エキサイター), Shigu Faitā Ī Ekkusu (Ekisaitā)): Originally an aircraft made for Chief Tsutsumi's use, Gamu's first sortie in it without permission allowed him keep it as his personal jet. Aside from the development of remote flying system, he can also install his AI PAL to maneuver it when transforming as Gaia, allowing him to operate in secret. The aircraft was destroyed by Zogu in episode 50 when PAL piloted it to save Gamu.
  - XIG Fighter ST (XIGファイターST, Shigu Faitā Esu Tī): An improved variant of XIG Fighter SS. Initially, the development stopped due to the excessive driving force but continued upon the arrival of Radical Destruction Bringer. Aside from the improved speed, motor performances also went escalated. (Note: Miniature is modified from XIG Fighter SS.)
  - XIG Fighter GT (XIGファイターGT, Shigu Faitā Jī Tī): An improved variant of XIG Fighter SG. Despite lagging behind SS in terms of speed, it possess enhanced mobility. Unlike its predecessors, team leaders are required to pilot it, which was filled by Kajio and Inagi. (Note: Miniature is repaint from XIG Fighter SG.)
  - Seagull Floater (シーガル・フローター, Shīgaru Furōtā): A rescue machine piloted by Team Seagull to save civilians via thermal detector. The aircraft is highly stable and can also operate under heavy winds and fire.
  - MLRS Bison (MLRSバイソン, Emu Eru Āru Esu Baison): Also deployed by the G.U.A.R.D. ground base. An armored combat buggy which is used by Team Hercules, armed with Cyclidor Cannon (サイクライダー砲, Saikuraidā-hō) and 200 mm Armor-Piercing Bullet (200mm徹甲弾, Nihyaku-mirimētoru Tekkōdan).
  - GBT Stinger (GBTスティンガー, Jī Bī Tī Sutingā): A high performance mobile tank piloted by Team Hercules. It has 900 kg of various ammunition, including 50 Grenade Missiles (グレネードミサイル, Gurenēdo Misairu) and Ultimate Napalms (アルティメイトナパーム, Arutimeito Napāmu) to fight under various circumstances.
  - Seagull Fantop (シーガル・ファントップ, Shīgaru Fantoppu): A terrestrial rescue vehicle deployed by Team Seagull in ground-based rescue missions. It also possess a fire extinguisher to put out fires from monster attacks, including secondary disasters that carried out by fighter team attacks.
  - Siren 7500 (セイレーン7500, Seirēn Nanasen-gohyaku): A compact universal submarine operated by Team Marlin, capable of operating even on 10,000 meters below the sea level. Its also drives upon jet propulsion and attacks via Marlin Blast Cannon (マーリンブラスト砲, Mārin Burasuto-hō).
- Bellman (ベルマン, Beruman): A modified Honda Accord Wagon used for travelling and tracking purposes via high exploration device. Although it possess machine guns, it was never put to use.
- XIG Adventure (XIGアドベンチャー, Shigu Adobenchā): (Note: In Uchūsen YEAR BOOK 2000, the name is referred to as "Unit Adventure" (アドベンチャー号, Adobenchā-gō) whereas a certain magazine referred to it as "Adventure" (アドベンチャー, Adobenchā).) An experimental hyperspace traveling machine used by Gamu in The Battle In Hyperspace movie. It was named after the titular character's ship from Gulliver's Travels. It has two forms, the vehicle mode is used for hyperspace traveling while its combat mode can be used in against monster attacks. Gamu used the machine to go to Tsutomu's dimension and fought against the King of Mons. When said monster easily shrugs Gamu's assaults, he was forced to transform into Gaia to finish the fight.

== G.U.A.R.D. ==
The Geocentric Universal Alliance against the Radical Destruction (対根源的破滅地球防衛連合, Tai Kongen-teki Hametsu Chikyū Bōei Rengō), abbreviated as G.U.A.R.D. (ガード, Gādo), is an organization founded in the year 1996 and based on New York. Formed by the United Nations and Alchemy Stars, its purpose is to prepare against the assault carried on by Radical Destruction Bringer as predicted by the supercomputer Chrisis. Despite its militaristic approach, they can also resort to democratic aspects such as giving priority to self-hope for assignment.

Members

- Tatsumi Chiba (千葉 辰巳, Chiba Tatsumi): The 51 year old staff officer who stations in the Aerial Base Command Room and observes the activities of XIG members. He is also a reasonable person when it comes to questioning the existence of Radical Destruction Bringer and has a huge trust upon XIG members. He is portrayed by Sei Hiraizumi (平泉 成, Hiraizumi Sei).
- Hiroyuki Hiiragi (柊 博之, Hiiragi Hiroyuki): A brigadier general who develops the use of Underground Penetrate Nuclear Missile to attack Tigris, believing that he can protect precious things. It wasn't until he realized that the world he see is small and cooperated with the Earth monsters in against armies of Radical Destruction Bringer. He is portrayed by Takeshi Yamato (大和 武士, Yamato Takeshi).
- Ryuichi Senuma (瀬沼 龍一, Senuma Ryūichi): The chief of Geo Base's special investigation team Lizard (リザード, Rizādo). He investigates paranormal cases, including the traces of Fujimiya during monster attacks. He is portrayed by Hiroshi Ishii (石井 浩, Ishii Hiroshi).
- Akira Tanimoto (谷本 明, Tanimoto Akira): The staff officer who indulges the Worm Jump Missile (ワーム・ジャンプ・ミサイル, Wāmu Janpu Misairu) to prepare for a counterattack against the Radical Destruction Bringer. He is portrayed by Shin Tatsuma (辰馬 伸, Tatsuma Shin).
- Kosuke Ranbashi (乱橋 巧介, Ranbashi Kōsuke): A terminally ill chief who serves as the director for constructions of new XIG Fighter models. He is portrayed by Mitsuo Hamada (浜田 光夫, Hamada Mitsuo).
- Higuchi (樋口): The chief of the chemical department of Geo Base. He is portrayed by Ryōsuke Kaizu (海津 亮介, Kaizu Ryōsuke).
- Doctor Hoshiyama (星山博士, Hoshiyama-hakase; 14): The doctor of the quantum mechanics department of the scientific inquiry section of Geo Base. He is portrayed by Kazuma Suzuki (鈴木 一馬, Suzuki Kazuma).
- Alf Mckay (アルフ・マッケイ, Arufu Makkei; 33): The command team captain of G.U.A.R.D. United States. He is portrayed by Patrick Harlan (パトリック・ハーラン, Patorikku Hāran).
- Jeremy Spinoza (ジェレミー・スピノザ, Jeremī Supinoza; 10, OV): The executive of G.U.A.R.D. United States, he was among the members who chased Fujimiya in America after being accused for awakening Zonnel. When Rinar recharged Agul's light, Jeremy returned the Agulater to Fujimiya. He is portrayed by Jack Woodyard (ジャック・ウッドヤード, Jakku Uddoyādo) and voiced by Yasunori Masutani (増谷 康紀, Masutani Yasunori), who would later voice Ultraman Nexus in his titular series.

Base of operations

- Aerial Mother Ship Base Aerial Base (空中母艦基地 エリアル・ベース, Kūchū Bokan Kichi Eriaru Bēsu): The 600 m long G.U.A.R.D.'s forefront base and XIG's main base of operations, acting as "the front line of offense and defense". It was built under the cooperation of Alchemy Stars and floats above the clouds via Repulsor Lift (リパルサーリフト, Riparusā Rifuto), Gamu's own invention. Despite being a simple base, it can also act as a space battleship in case of emergency. The Aerial Base almost fall in episodes 18 and 27 under Fujimiya and Chrisis Ghost's attack before both of them were banished. In episode 47, it was used as the final line of defense against Mokian as Commander Ishimuro had PAL navigated the ship in against the monster. Seconds before the entire ship exploded, Gaia managed to save him and brought to Earth. In Once Again Gaia, a second Aerial Base was mentioned and nearing completion.
- Geo Base (ジオベース, Jio Bēsu): A facility which acted as the center operations for G.U.A.R.D. Japan, situated in Tokyo. Most of its buildings and basements were situated underground. Originally it was relatively a facility for research but gradually expanded to a huge base with large military and defense facilities, and is frequently exposed to raids of invaders. Aside from being the Lizard's operational base, it also serve as the temporary base for XIG after Aerial Base's destruction.
- G.U.A.R.D. International Forum (G.U.A.R.D.国際フォーラム, Gādo Kokusai Fōramu): An operational base which performs secret experimentation of weapons underneath the basement. It was once attacked by Blitz Blotz.

Mechas

The mechas of G.U.A.R.D. are only focused on existing weapons, they were lagging behind XIG in terms of attack and defensive power despite being much more versatile. As the organization gets bigger, they started to develop more dangerous weapons.

- Dove Liner (ダヴ・ライナー, Davu Rainā): Mass-produced shuttles used for transportation of passengers from Aerial Base to ground base. Being a non-combat mecha, it serves in a similar vein to commercial airplane and possess no defensive weapons.
- Bellman (G.U.A.R.D. Custom) (ベルマン (G.U.A.R.D.仕様), Beruman (Gādo Shiyō)): Similar type of vehicles used by XIG, it possess the Team Lizard's logo and rode by Senuma during investigation missions.
- G.U.A.R.D. Fighter (G.U.A.R.D.戦闘機, Gādo Sentō-ki): A modified F-15 Eagle made in America and deployed by G.U.A.R.D. members in various branches. Each nations had different color schemes, such as gray for Australia and white and blue for South Pacific. In episode 51, which focuses on Mission Gaia, XIG Fighter Teams deployed in the machine itself which was modified with the Repulsor Lift technology.
- Defense Force Support Fighter (防衛隊支援戦闘機, Bōei-tai Shien Sentō-ki): A type of aircraft deployed by defense forces, based on F-15J and armed with AAM-9 Sidewinder missiles. It was first shown in against C.O.V. during the first episode.
- G.U.A.R.D. Medium Tank (G.U.A.R.D.中戦車, Gādo Chū Sensha): Anti aircraft tanks drove by Hiiragi and belonged to the Land Force Troops of Arizona Pacific Rims. It was also shown in against Zonnel II and Kaiser Dobishi.
- Underground Penetrate Nuclear Missile Launch Base (地底貫通弾発射基地, Chitei Kantsū-dan Hassha Kichi): It was built around Lake Tsumura under command of Hiiragi and attacked Tigris towards 1500 m underground. It is also developed in G.U.A.R.D. Europe and China branch.
- Nature Circulation Protection System Ent (自然循環保護システム・エント, Shizen Junkan Hogo Shisutemu Ento): A system built by American branch of G.U.A.R.D. to control the increasing numbers of carbon dioxide due to deforestation. Catherine was one of the developers of said project and decided to call it off after finding a failure within it, as well as seeing how it threatens the nearby forest during a test launch in Canada.

== KCB ==
The Kantoh Community Broadcasting Station, Ltd (関東コミュニケーションテレビ, Kantō Komyunikēshon Terebi; KCB), is the central broadcasting station of media. Although there were no relation, same television media also made their cameo appearances in Ultraman Dyna, Ultraman Max and Ultraman Mebius.

- Kenji Tabata (田端 健二, Tabata Kenji): The 28-year-old director who pursues truth and has a skeptical viewpoint regarding G.U.A.R.D. Despite being hot-blooded and usually enters the dangerous sites just to get news coverage, he is surprisingly caring to Reiko. Tabata was absent during the events of Once Again Gaia, as he went to an interview in Bosnia. He is portrayed by Hiroshi Tsuburaya (円谷 浩, Tsuburaya Hiroshi).
- Reiko Yoshii (吉井 玲子, Yoshii Reiko): A 24-year-old popular announcer who gains interest in Fujimiya after frequently crosses paths with him, eventually supporting him during his hardship. As of Once Again Gaia, Reiko is promoted to the program caster and had a different hairstyle. She is portrayed by Yukari Ishida (石田 裕加里, Ishida Yukari), who in turn is married to Hassei Takano, Fujimiya's actor.
- Michifumi Inoue (井上 倫文, Inoue Michifumi): A 25-year-old cameraman, more commonly known by his nickname "Rinbun" (リンブン; an alternate reading of "Michifumi"). Due to his actions in recording the battle of Gaia and Agul against Zogu, this caused their identities to be publicly unmasked and unintentionally spreads despair among humanity. In the final episode, he recorded the return of Gaia and Agul under Tabata's orders. He is portrayed by Eisuke Tsunoda (角田 英介, Tsunoda Eisuke).
- Umezawa (梅沢; 8): A director of a branch office and Tabata's senior, taking his place during Anemosu's appearance. He is portrayed by Kazuo Andou (安藤 一夫, Andō Kazuo).

== Alchemy Stars ==
Alchemy Stars (アルケミー・スターズ, Arukemī Sutāzu) is a British scientist based network founded back in the 1980s, composed of child prodigies from around the globe. In response to the incoming assault from Radical Destruction Bringer, they provide major contributions to G.U.A.R.D. and its umbrella, XIG.

Members

- Daniel McPhee (ダニエル・マクフィー, Danieru Makufī): The 24-year-old chairman of Alchemy Stars, who frequently contacts G.U.A.R.D. and XIG. He is portrayed by John O'Connor (ジョン・オコーナー, Jon O Kōnā).
- Miku Asano (浅野 未来, Asano Miku; 8, 44): A 20-year-old specialist whose work involves ancient monsters. She is portrayed by Masami Imamura (今村 雅美, Imamura Masami).
- Catherine Ryan (キャサリン・ライアン, Kyasarin Raian): The 20-year-old development officer of Natural Circulation Protection System Ent in Canada. She is also involved in Mission Gaia. She is portrayed by Debbie Regier (デビー・リギアー, Debī Rigiā).
- Klaus EcCult (クラウス・エッカルト, Kurausu Ekkaruto): A founding member who is one of the designers of the Chrisis integrated-circuit. After Chrisis predicted the arrival of Radical Destruction Bringer, Klaus voluntarily surrenders himself and became a member of the Spirit Parasites. He is portrayed by Albert Smith (アルバート・スミス, Arubāto Sumisu; 42).
- Alan (アラン, Aran; 14), Al (アル, Aru), and Natalie (ナタリー, Natarī): Members with each had a supercomputer and cooperated in the design of antimatter conversion system. Alan is portrayed by Benjamin Rotla (ベンジャミン・ロトラ, Benjyamin Rotora).
- Michel (ミッシェル, Missheru; 42): A French member. She is portrayed by Tom Watson (トム・ワトソン, Tomu Watoson).
- Melinda (メリンダ, Merinda; 51): The girl who cooperated in the Mission Gaia, voicing her excitement for working with Kajio. She is portrayed by Belinda Passwell (ベリンダ・パスウェル, Berinda Pasuweru).
- Azif (アジフ, Ajifu; 42, 51): A Pakistani member who cooperated in the Worm Jump Missile and Mission Gaia. He is portrayed by Gen Satō (佐藤 元, Satō Gen).

Arsenal

- Chrisis (クリシス, Kurishisu): A supercomputer that was created by Fujimiya in 1997. Its original purpose is to assist the Alchemy Stars but was secretly hacked by the Chrisis Ghost virus sent by the Radical Destruction Bringer, deceiving Fujimiya into believing humanity as the Earth's destroyer. The computer went berserk from Zorium's arrival and eventually ceased operations by European branch of Alchemy Stars. At the height of the final episode, Fujimiya reactivated Chrisis to support XIG and G.U.A.R.D. in an operation to restore Gaia and Agul's light.

== Ultraman ==
=== Ultraman Gaia ===
Ultraman Gaia (ウルトラマンガイア, Urutoraman Gaia) is the titular character of the series. The red giant of light who appeared when the Earth responded to the strong will of Gamu Takayama's desire to protect people of Earth, and bestowed the young man Gaia's red "light of Earth" (大地の光, Daichi no Hikari). Gaia was named by Gamu in episode 3 after the Greek personification of the Earth and Gaia hypothesis. Although Gamu is consciously in control of the giant, there are times when Gaia would exert his own full strength due to his dedication to the human beings and Earth.

Gaia's forms includes:

- V1: Gaia's original form, appears in episodes 1 to 26. Being empowered by the will of the Earth, Gaia's abilities revolves around the use of heat energies and brute strength. His main finishers are Photon Edge (フォトンエッジ, Foton Ejji) and Quantum Stream (クァンタムストリーム, Kuantamu Sutorīmu). Although being revolved around thermal energies, Gaia can also radiates frozen energy called Gaia Blizzard (ガイアブリザード, Gaia Burizādo).
- V2: Gaia's current appearance, making its debut in episode 26. After being bestowed with the blue light of Sea from Fujimiya, Gaia's Gaia Breastar (ガイアブレスター, Gaia Buresutā) changes its color from red to black. Aside from the upgraded strength of his original attacks, Gaia can also perform Agul V1's original techniques, such as the Liquidator, the Photon Crusher and the Agul Blade. Because of the improvements in Gaia's body and the acceptance of Agul's light, Gamu required the need to train himself in order to catch up with his compatibility.
- Supreme Version (スプリーム・ヴァージョン, Supurīmu Vājon): Gaia's strongest form, which was accessed after simultaneously utilizing both the power of the land and sea. The Gaia Breastar extended to his shoulders and gains blue markings on the hips. Aside from his muscular appearance, Gaia gains a massive power boost in his attacks. His main finisher is Photon Stream (フォトンストリーム, Foton Sutorīmu).
- Super Supreme Version (スーパー・スプリーム・ヴァージョン, Sūpā Supurīmu Vājon): A fusion of Gaia and Agul that debuted in the 2023 stage show Ultra Heroes Expo 2023 Summer Festival in Ikebukuro Sunshine City.

Ultraman Gaia is voiced by Takeshi Yoshioka (Gamu Takayama's actor) in the series and by Junichi Miyake (三宅 淳一, Miyake Jun'ichi) in Ultraman Boy no Urukoro. The change of color in his Gaia Breastar in V2 is due to designer Hiroshi Maruyama's wish for a black coloration in a titular Ultra Warrior. Said color is inspired by the black tea. His mouth is designed after the B Type suit of Ultraman.

=== Ultraman Agul ===
Ultraman Agul (ウルトラマンアグル, Urutoraman Aguru) is the supporting character of the series. He is "the sea giant of light" (海の光の巨人, Umi no Hikari no Kyojin) that was born three years earlier than Gaia in the Alchemy Star's base of Pronone Caramos. His true purpose was to guard the Earth from the threats of Radical Destruction Bringer but was sidetracked from his human host (Fujimiya)'s misguided ideology and fought Gaia on certain occasions. After realizing his mistake, Fujimiya surrendered Agul's light to Gaia but regained it from the Earth at the height of Σ-Zuiguru's invasion. It was at this point the two started to fight on the same side and eventually faced against the Radical Destruction Bringer's minions at the series' finale arc.

His forms include:

- V1: Agul's original appearance from episode 3 to 26. His Agul Breastar (アグルブレスター, Aguru Buresutā) covers his chest, shoulders and hips while fighting in elegance as opposed to Gaia. In close combat, he is capable of drawing the Agul Blade (アグルブレード, Aguru Burēdo), an energy sword from his right arm. His finishing attacks are Liquidator (リキデイター, Rikideitā) and Photon Crusher (フォトンクラッシャー, Foton Kurasshā).
- V2: Agul's updated form and his current appearance, debuted in episode 41. His Agul Breastar is reduced to the chest, while he retains his original fighting style. Because of his human host's renewed friendship with Gamu, Agul is shown to be more kind and surprising defeat but usually performs a tremendous combination with Gaia during the battle. His new main attacks are the Agul Stream (アグルストリーム, Aguru Sutorīmu), the Photon Screw (フォトンスクリュー, Foton Sukuryū) and the Agul Saber (アグルセイバー, Aguru Seibā), the latter two are upgrades of V1's Liquidator and Agul Blade.
- Supreme Version: A further-enhanced form of Agul which parallels Gaia's form of the same name. Design of this form already existed since the series' original conception, but received its suit in the 2021 stage show Ultra Heroes Expo 2021 Summer Festival in Ikebukuro Sunshine City.

Ultraman Agul is voiced by Hassei Takano (Hiroya Fujimiya's actor) in the original series and by Kouta Nemoto (根本 幸多, Nemoto Kōta) in Ultraman Boy no Urukoro. His name officially appeared in episode 16 after the Roman letters "AGUL" appeared on the screen from Fujimiya's flashback. In real life, Ultraman Agul is named by the coined word for the English words "aggressive" and "agreement", as well as the Japanese word aku (悪; lit. "evil"). His mouth is designed after the B Type suit of Ultraseven. In the original planning, Agul was meant to disappear but his and Fujimiya's eventual return was decided after finding the character's increasing popularity.

=== The Battle in Hyperspace ===
- Ultraman Tiga: See here
- Ultraman Dyna (ウルトラマンダイナ, Urutoraman Daina): An Ultraman who was summoned to the reality by Tsutomu's wish alongside Tiga to assist Gaia in against King of Mons and its cohorts. Dyna engaged in a space combat against Basiliss, destroying the monster with Empowered Solgent Ray before disappearing with Tiga when Tsutomu's world was given a reset. 20 years later in The Adventure in Hyperspace, the Dyna that Tsutomu summoned to fight against Basiliss was indeed a dimensional-displaced Shin Asuka (アスカ・シン, Asuka Shin) from his series' run. While trying to reach Gamu with the rebuilt XIG Adventure, an adult Tsutomu found himself in the middle of Super GUTS' campaign against Spume and Reicubas (circa episodes 25 and 26 of Ultraman Dyna). Asuka regained his memories and led the Super GUTS members in Kraakov to join forces with Daigo/Tiga and GUTS in assisting Gaia during his fight with Charija's monsters. After killing Nosferu, Asuka transformed into Dyna in against Chaos Jilark, finally teaming up with the other two Ultras in fighting Demon Gyrares XIV. In the movie, Dyna is voiced by Takeshi Tsuruno (つるの 剛士, Tsuruno Takeshi), who portrays Shin Asuka his titular series.

== Antagonists ==
=== Radical Destruction Bringer ===
Radical Destruction Bringer (根源的破滅招来体, Kongen-teki Hametsu Shōrai-tai) is portrayed as a mysterious force that aimed to destroy humanity from Earth by sending monsters from a wormhole. Its existence was predicted by sorcerer Kijuro Mato from 500 years prior and eventually led to the foundation of G.U.A.R.D. and its branch XIG. Having foreseen the arrival of Earth's guardians (Gaia and Agul), it was responsible for deceiving Fujimiya into viewing humanity as Earth's enemies. Despite G.U.A.R.D.'s attempts to resist it, there are several cults on Japan which praises the Radical Destruction Bringer as a force of divine punishment to sinners. According to the Deathbringer, the Radical Destruction Bringer's reason to destroy humanity was due to its assumption on said race as a dangerous pathogen to the universe.

Chiaki J. Konaka never visualizes how did the Radical Destruction Bringer appeared to be. In fact, he left the interpretation to the writers of the series.

=== Forces of Radical Destruction Bringer ===
- Space Combat Beast C.O.V. (宇宙戦闘獣 コッヴ, Uchū Sentō-jū Kovvu; 1, 2): The first monster to appear on Earth, brought by the Radical Destruction Bringer. Its name is an acronym for Cosmic Organism Vanguard. It is capable of firing energy bullets from its head and has a pair of C.O.V. Sickles (コッヴシッケル, Kovvu Shikkeru) for hands. Although C.O.V. becomes Gaia's first kill during Gamu's first bond, its arrival had caused the awakening of multiple Earth monsters and is also consistent with the prediction of Kijuro Mato.
  - Space Combat Beast C.O.V. II (宇宙戦闘獣 コッヴII, Uchū Sentō-jū Kovvu Tsū; 10): (Note: Also called as Space Combat Beast C.O.V. II (White Version) (宇宙戦闘獣 コッヴII (ホワイトヴァージョン), Uchū Sentō-jū Kovvu Tsū (Howaito Vājon); 10) in the Uchusen YEAR BOOK 2000.) White variants of C.O.V. that house themselves within the Planet Destruction Machine Versite (惑星破壊機 ヴァーサイト, Wakusei Hakai-ki Vāsaito) and acted as invasion weapons against the Earth. After luring the Versite to Alaska, an adult C.O.V. II fought against Gaia and gain support from its cubs until XIG Fighters destroyed the smaller monsters, allowing Gaia to finish both C.O.V. II and the crashed Versite.
  - Space Combat Beast Super-C.O.V. (宇宙戦闘獣 超(スーパー)コッヴ, Uchū Sentō-jū Sūpā Kovvu; 44): A C.O.V. which was enlarged and mutated when G.U.A.R.D.'s attempt to strike the M91 wormhole (44 light years away from Earth) failed. Although initially a harmless adult monster, Super-C.O.V. becomes rampant once it stepped onto Earth and fought against Gaia and Agul with the help of Super-Pazuzu, only for both monsters to be defeated by the combined Ultras' attack. Due to being an upgraded variant, Super-C.O.V. wielded a pair of C.O.V. Sickles on its arms and launches Flash C.O.V. Shot (フラッシュコッヴショット, Furasshu Kovvu Shotto) energy bullets.
- Nature Control Machines (自然コントロールマシーン, Shizen Kontorōru Mashīn): robots programmed by Radical Destruction Bringer to reset the entire environment on Earth and bring humanity to extinction. They were self-proclaimed to be creations from the future humanity, who were on the verge of despair and had already submit to the power of Radical Destruction Bringer.
  - Ten-Kai (天界(テンカイ), Tenkai; 7): The first machine to appear, it attempts to create a large typhoon which emits hazardous substances that led to humanity's extinction within six months. After being attacked by Team Lightning, Ten-Kai fought against Gaia and destroyed after he removed the robot's core and slammed it to the entire body.
  - Enzan (炎山(エンザン); 28): The second machine, emerging from Mt. Aburada in Gamu's hometown. Its main purpose is to prevent the coming of another ice age, thus the emission of heatwaves towards nearby village. Upon transformation into a stag beetle-themed monster, Enzan went on a rampaging spree until Gaia appeared as he assumed Supreme Version and penetrated Enzan's core to destroy it.
  - Shinryoku (深緑(シンリョク); 46): The last control machine that emerged from Kohoku Techno Park. Its main purpose is to cleanse the human civilization with excessive vegetation. After Catherine destroyed the main circuit, Shinryoku absorbed the energies of nearby plants to evolve into its robot form and fought against Gaia before being defeated by Photon Edge. As an alleged creation of future humanity, Shinryoku's inner frame matches that of Nature Circulation Protection System Ent that was developed by Catherine and the Alchemy Stars members in Canada.
- Space Thunder Beast Pazuzu (宇宙雷獣 パズズ, Uchū Raijū Pazuzu; 22): A monster that was sent from a wormhole which was covered by thunderclouds. Through Special Radio Wave Brain (特殊電波ブレイン, Tokushu Denpa Burein), it caused disruption in communication waves, uses Thunder Shock Horn (雷撃ホーン, Raigeki Hōn) to launch lightning bolts and exhales fireballs from its mouth. It attacked Tokyo, which was nearby Kōki's house, Chiba's nephew. Gaia fought against the monster and managed to destroy it with Quantum Stream.
  - Space Thunder Beast Super-Pazuzu (宇宙雷獣 超(スーパー)パズズ, Uchū Raijū Sūpā Pazuzu; 44): A Pazuzu which was enlarged and mutated when G.U.A.R.D.'s attempt to strike the M91 wormhole (44 light years away from Earth) failed. Although initially a harmless adult monster, Super-Pazuzu becomes rampant once it stepped onto Earth and fought against Gaia and Agul with the help of Super-C.O.V., only for both monsters to be defeated by the combined Ultras' attack.
- Giant Beast Zorium (巨獣 ゾーリム, Kyojū Zōrimu; 26): (Note: Its tentative name was Zorick (ゾーリック, Zōrikku). In addition, the length of its original prop is 4 meters.) A large dragon-like creature from the black hole, feeding energies from Gaia and Agul's fight. Once it emerged, Chrisis Ghost begins to react from its arrival as Gaia obtains the light of Agul when Fujimiya descends into a breakdown. By utilizing Supreme Version, Gaia enters Zorium's mouth and terminated the monster from within via Photon Stream.
- Electric Organism Chrisis Ghost (電子生命体 クリシスゴースト, Denshi Seimei-tai Kurishisu Gōsuto; 26, 27): A computer virus created by Radical Destruction Bringer to infect Fujimiya's supercomputer Chrisis, doing so to deceive him when receiving Agul's light. After it went berserk from Zoruim's arrival, Chrisis was shut down by Alchemy Stars, forcing the virus to escape and attempted to hack into Aerial Base until Atsuko drive the virus out. Once arriving at the Geo Base, Chrisis Ghost fused with remnants of Apatee and Algyuros to form its own body.
  - Imit-Ultraman Gaia (ニセウルトラマンガイア, Nise Urutoraman Gaia; 27): The first form taken by using the data of Ultraman Gaia (V1) in the Geo Base. After holding Ohgawara due to his faith in Gaia as a friend, the real Ultra saved him and exposed the impostor.
  - Metal Organism Mimos (金属生命体 ミーモス, Kinzoku Seimei-tai Mīmosu; 27): The monstrous form of Chrisis Ghost after assimilating with remnants of Apatee and Alguros. It is capable of transform parts of its metal organs into makeshift weapons. After his Imit-Ultraman Gaia form being unmasked, Mimos further attacked the original Ultra until XIG Fighters attacked and Gaia Supreme Version to conclude it with Photon Stream.
- Space Ninja Beast X-Savarga (宇宙忍獣 X(クロス)サバーガ, Uchū Ninjū Kurosu Sabāga; 36): Emerged from the wormhole created by Fujimiya, whose failed attempt in suicide bombing caused by a barrier closing it. Gaia managed to save him before his ship detonated as X-Savarga landed on Earth. Its main abilities is to use a wide array of tricks (true to its subtitle "Space Ninja Beast"), regenerating destroyed limbs and summoning Mini X-Savarga as suicide bombers. Fujimiya managed to attack the real monster when it unleashes two other illusions, allowing Gaia Supreme to end it with Supreme Kick.
  - Biological Weapon Mini X-Savarga (生体兵器 小X(クロス)サバーガ, Seitai Heiki Shō Kurosu Sabāga; 36): Suicide bombers launched from the hands of X-Savarga, they detonated once absorbing their target's energies.
- Large Air Demon Pasgeek (大宙魔 パスギーク, Dai Chūma Pasugīku; 40): Arrived on Earth via the Wave Tube (波動チューブ, Hadō Chūbu), Pasgeek was a bio-weapon sent from a mysterious wormhole to attack the Geo Base. While trying to escape in the middle of a fight with Gaia, Pasgeek was killed by the Ultra's Shining Blade.
- Space Capture Mecha Beast Σ-Zuiguru (宇宙捕獲メカ獣 Σズイグル, Uchū Hokaku Meka-jū Shiguma Zuiguru; 41): A robot send from a giant wormhole under the directive to capture Ultraman Gaia. After descending via metallic powders, Σ-Zuiguru reconstitute itself and feigned destruction from Gaia's Gaia Slash. Sometime later, Σ-Zuiguru reconstitute itself and crucified Gamu to its own torso using Cross Catcher (クロスキャッチャー, Kurosu Kyatchā), only to be defeated by Agul V2 via Photon Screw. After its second reconstitution, Σ-Zuiguru flies via a Christian cross-like formation by folding its arms and revealing a pair of Gravity Control Device (重力コントロール装置, Jūryoku Kontorōru Sōchi).
- Spirit Parasite (精神寄生体, Seishin Kisei-tai; 42): Servants to the Radical Destruction Bringer, they converted Klaus into one of them after surrendering himself. During Σ-Zuiguru's attack, Klaus implanted a transmission diode in Gamu's XIG-NAVI in an attempt to psychologically haunt him before his schemes exposed. After being discovered by Gamu and Catherine, Klaus merged with other Spirit Parasites to form Bizorm.
  - Parasitic Spirit Beast Bizorm (精神寄生獣 ビゾーム, Seishin Kisei-jū Bizōmu; 42): A combination of Spirit Parasites, called as "wisdom of a distant star" (遥かなる星の叡智, Harukanaru Hoshi no Eichi) and empowers itself with humanity's minus energy. Facing against Gaia, Bizorm engaged in a sword fight before being sliced into several pieces, allowing them to regenerate into Mini Bizorms (ミニビゾーム, Mini Bizōmu) until Gaia Supreme Version cleared them with Photon Stream. Bizorm merged but once more destroyed by Gaia's Supreme Cross Counter.
- Destruction Devil Blitz-Blotz (破滅魔人 ブリッツブロッツ, Hametsu Majin Burittsu Burottsu; 45): An intelligent life form that aimed for the Life Gauges of Ultraman Gaia and Agul. Aside from its aerial proficiency, it is capable of redirecting incoming attacks through the hidden crystal on its chest. Having defeated Agul, Blitz-Blotz attacked Geo Satellite 3 that contained a hidden experimental weapon underneath and faced resistance from XIG and Tigris II. After overloading itself with Gaia's Quantum Stream, Team Hercules and Hiiragi open fire on its chest, allowing Gaia Supreme Version to finish him with Photon Stream.
- Super Gigantic Monopole Organism Mokian (超巨大単極子(モノポール)生物 モキアン, Chō Kyodai Monopōru Seibutsu Mokian; 47): A gigantic organism that served the Deathbringer. Acting as a "present" on behalf of Radical Destruction Bringer, Mokian's true motif is to cleanse the Earth through the use of a monopole within its body, which would cause the union of all continents into a single land. In order to stop Mokian, Gamu suggested the use of Aerial Base's Repalser Wheel as a South pole force to counter its monopole effect at the cost of the base. Although evacuation process completed, the damage of Repalser Wheel and Gaia's capture by Mokian forced Ishimuro to stay on board and direct PAL to charge the base towards the monster. As a result of the collision course, Gaia was able to free himself and rescued Ishimuro in time before the explosion. It is named after the Japanese word for "goosefish liver" (アンコウの肝, Ankō no Kimo), further tying to its goosefish design motif.
- Deathbringer (死神, Shinigami; 47, 48): The messenger of Radical Destruction Bringer that took residence in the Womb of Mokian (モキアンの体内, Mokian no Tainai). After luring Fujimiya by kidnapping Reiko, the Deathbringer conveyed the former with Radical Destruction Bringer's offer to join them in exchange for Mokian. When Fujimiya rejected the offer, he took on the challenge against the Ultras by transforming into his true form Zebubu. He is portrayed by Masami Horiuchi (堀内 正美, Horiuchi Masami), who also had a cameo appearance as a KCB newscaster in the same episode he debuted. He is themed after Bodhisattva
  - Destruction Devil Zebubu (破滅魔人 ゼブブ, Hametsu Majin Zebubu; 48): The true identity of Deathbringer, whose design motif is based on a housefly. His main weapon is a sword that was sharp enough puncture an Ultra's flesh and shielding its entire body with electromagnetic barriers. Having defeated Agul, Zebubu fought against Gaia V2 and XIG Fighters before Yoneda opened fire on his eyes (the only part that was unprotected), allowing Gaia Supreme Version to finish it with Photon Stream.
- Destruction Demon Bug Dobishi (破滅魔虫 ドビシ, Hametsu Machū Dobishi; 49-51): Zogu's army of locusts, coming from a strange wormhole and covered the entire Earth from the sun. Its main ability is to form into Kaiser Dobishi (カイザードビシ, Kaizā Dobishi) to face giant opponents, both Ultramen and Earth monsters alike. The entire army were cleared by the revived Gaia and Agul. The Dobishi itself were themed after Abaddon from the Book of Revelation.
- Radical Destruction Angel Zogu (根源破滅天使 ゾグ, Kongen Hametsu Tenshi Zogu; 49-51): The final monster to appear in the series, being the largest in both of her forms and is a figure that is close to the Radical Destruction Bringer. She led the Dobishi into attacking Earth and destroyed other means of communications except television to ensure despair among humanity. Although defeated both Gaia and Agul in her debut and absorbed their lights, the Earth monsters and G.U.A.R.D. forces band together as they restore the giants and launch a successive counterattack, destroying the monster itself.
  - First Form (第1形態, Dai-ichi Keitai; 49-51): Zogu's first appearance consist of an angel/white goddess, which allowed her to deceive her opponents. Standing at the height of 127 metres, this form is capable of launching shockwave balls and manipulating light, doing so to recharge Gaia and Agul or remove their ability to transform. Zogu's first form is portrayed by stunt actress Motoko Nagino (梛野 素子, Nagino Motoko). Chiaki J. Konaka emphasized her first form not to spread fears among others while special skill director Kazuo Segawa viewed it as a new image of Space Dinosaur Zetton (宇宙恐竜 ゼットン, Uchū Kyōryū Zetton). (Note: The final monster from episode 39 of Ultraman.)
  - Second Form (第2形態, Dai-ni Keitai; 51): After receiving multiple attacks from the revived Gaia and Agul, Zogu changes into a gigantic monster that resembles a griffon. This form bears the height of 666 metres and unleashes a shrill scream upon transformation. Mizunoeno Dragon joined the Ultras in their fight before the former two combined their energy beams and destroy her for good.
- Radical Destruction Sea-God Gakzom (根源破滅海神 ガクゾム, Kongen Hametsu Kaijin Gakuzomu; OV): Gakzom is a remnant of Radical Destruction Bringer's followers and made its attack by absorbing the lights from Rinar civilization. When Team Marlin picked their signal, they fired upon said monster but it managed to get to the surface and attacked the Tokyo Bay city. Facing against Gaia and Agul, Gakzom absorbs several Baiakuhee into Gakzom (Empowered Form) (ガクゾム (強化体), Gakuzomu (Kyōka-tai)) and almost defeated the two Ultras until Rinar replenished their energies, allowing them to turn the tides of the battle and destroy it.
- Radical Destruction Flying Fish Baiakuhee (根源破滅飛行魚 バイアクヘー, Kongen Hametsu Hikō-gyo Baiakuhē; OV): Gakzom's followers, aside from being aquatic, they can also fly and turn their wings into blades. The entire school faced against G.U.A.R.D. Fighter squadron and absorbed Agul's strength before merging with Gakzom.

=== Wave Life Forms ===
The Wave Life Form Primal Mezard (波動生命体 プライマルメザード, Hadō Seimei-tai Puraimaru Mezādo; 4, 13, 19, 37) are jellyfish-like life forms that came from a different space-time location. Because of their nature, the XIG Fighters have trouble combating them until Gamu discovered their location. Upon being defeated, the Primal Mezard can transform themselves into their monstrous forms. The Adventure in Hypserspace novel has Charija acknowledged Psycho Mezard (and to a lesser extent, the Wave Life forms) as part of the forces of Radical Destruction Bringer.

Mezards

- Hyperspace Wave Monster Mezard (超空間波動怪獣 メザード, Chō Kūkan Hadō Kaijū Mezādo; 4): The first Mezard to appear. It was burned after being destroyed by Gaia's Photon Edge. (Note: Because of the destruction scene, the actual suit of Mezard was destroyed in the fire.)
- Hyperspace Wave Monster Psycho Mezard (超空間波動怪獣 サイコメザード, Chō Kūkan Hadō Kaijū Saiko Mezādo; 13, Novel): A monster that gained an interest in the experimentation of human mind control on the resort area of United States, causing it to shut down. Sometime later, it migrated to the resort area of Yamanishi Prefecture and brainwashed its population via communication waves. After its Wave Life Form stage was defeated, Psycho Mezard faced Gaia and tried to use the brainwashed citizens as hostages until Ultraman Agul blown the monster to pieces as Gaia shield its hostages. In Tiga, Dyna and Ultraman Gaia Novel: The Adventure in Hyperspace, the Psycho Mezard was kidnapped by Charija when Gaia was in the middle of fighting it and forced to serve the dimension-hopping alien in securing the Red Sphere. Psycho Mezard fought against Tiga Sky Type in an aerial combat and was destroyed when colliding with Chaos Jirak, who happened to be destroyed by Dyna Strong Type's Garnate Bomber Shooting Version.
- Hyperspace Wave Monster Psycho Mezard II (超空間波動怪獣 サイコメザードII, Chō Kūkan Hadō Kaijū Saiko Mezādo Tsū; 19): The same type of Psycho Mezard, with exception of a human-like face appearing on its abdomen. It emits hallucinogenic particles to manipulate humans, targeting Atsuko Sasaki of XIG through illusions of Lilia while hiding itself from a wormhole. When exposed by Team Falcon, the monster fought against Gaia and was destroyed by Quantum Stream after being weakened from Lilia's destruction.
- Hyperspace Wave Monster Queen-Mezard (超空間波動怪獣 クインメザード, Chō Kūkan Hadō Kaijū Kuin Mezādo; 37): The final Wave Life Form to appear in the series, displaying a sense of sentience and intelligence. By hiding itself within the KCB station, it tried to brainwash humanity via the station's communication wave and attempted to deceive Fujimiya with the image of Kyoko Inamori. When Gaia breached its hyperspace, Queen-Mezard summoned the illusion of Agul until XIG's missile caused the distortion in her hyperspace, allowing Gaia to destroy her via Liquidator.

Associated figures of illusions

- Lilia (リリア, Riria; 19): Atsuko's illusion of a little girl, created by Psycho Mezard II via hallucinogenic particles. Its main appearance is based on the similarly lost doll from her childhood and is the embodiment of her regret for not being able to participate in school events due to poor health. She is portrayed by Hisae Kamogawa (鴨川 寿枝, Kamogawa Hisae).
- Phantom-Ultraman Agul (幻影ウルトラマンアグル, Gen'ei Urutoraman Aguru; 37): A replica of Ultraman Agul (V1) created by Queen-Mezard, proclaimed to be the combined souls of monsters who died from G.U.A.R.D.'s Underground Penetrate Nuclear Missiles. The replicated giant fought against Gaia until XIG's special missile caused the disruption in the hyperspace and Phantom-Ultraman Agul to disappear.

=== Satan Bizor ===
Giant Aberrant Beast Satan Bizor (巨大異形獣 サタンビゾー, Kyodai Igyō-jū Satan Bizō) is a monster that appeared in The Battle In Hyperspace. (Note: Also romanized as "Satan-Bizarre".)

In the show-within-a-show Ultraman Gaia episode The Devil's Kiss, Satan Bizor was an enemy from Devil World Zorland (魔界ゾーランド, Makai Zōrando) who copied Gamu's appearance (declared as Black Gamu (黒い我夢, Kuroi Gamu)) before facing against Gaia. When Hiroshi Kashimada wished for the Red Sphere, he inadvertently brought Satan Bizor to his homeworld as well, leaving the dimensional-displaced Gamu to fight against it. In episode 42 of the original series, Satan Bizor is portrayed as an illusion in Gamu's nightmare, which resulted from a transmission diode placed in his XIG-NAVI during his capture by Σ-Zuiguru. This prompted Gamu to go to Germany and uncover the perpetrator.

Satan Bizor's main attacks are Satan's Kiss (サタンズキッス, Satanzu Kissu), Biss Beam (ビスビーム, Bisu Bīmu) and retractable Giant Claws (巨大爪, Kyōdai Tsume).

Satan Bizor is voiced by Daisuke Gōri (郷里 大輔, Gōri Daisuke) in The Battle In Hyperspace. As Black Gamu, he is portrayed by Takeshi Yoshioka.

=== Kijuro Mato/Gan-Q ===
Kijuro Mato (魔頭 鬼十朗, Matō Kijūrō; 31) is a sorcerer that lived 500 years ago prior to the series. Having predicted the arrival of Radical Destruction Bringer, Mato desired its power to rule Japan and transformed into Gan-Q to assassinate those who tried to prepare for its arrival. However his actions were discovered, and he was forced to curse his descendants to inherent his power until the arrival of the Radical Destruction Bringer and committed suicide to avoid capture.

Several months after the original Gan-Q's defeat, Mato appeared in the present and terrorized the city as a battered version of his Gan-Q form while coercing his cursed descendant Shusaku Sawamura to return his powers to him. When Shusaku refused to willingly comply, Mato took it by force and upgraded into Gan-Q Code No.02, nearly defeating Gaia before Shusaku weakened the monster long enough to be destroyed by Gaia Supreme Version.

The Strange Creature Gan-Q (奇獣 ガンQ, Ki-jū Gan Kyū; 6, 31) is a space monster that was once assumed as a form of Mato before his death. This monster is perhaps known for its tendency to insanely laugh and deliver psychological torture to its victim (Gamu) even from distance. Its forms include:

- Code No.00 (コードNo.00, Kōdo Nanbā Zero Zero; 6): Its original eyeball form, first appeared in the middle of XIG members Team Falcon and Hercules' aerial training. Gan-Q was able to absorb incoming projectiles and travel underground.
- Code No.01 (コードNo.01, Kōdo Nanbā Zero Wan; 6, 31): After absorbing the missile earlier and several rocks, Gan-Q gained its own physical body and is capable of firing energy projectiles while emitting tractor beams from its main eye. Gaia appears after he saved the XIG aircraft Peace Carry from being absorbed. During the fight, Gaia was absorbed into Gan-Q's body and tormented by its countless laughter before escaping, simultaneously destroying the monster.
- Code No.02 (コードNo.02, Kōdo Nanbā Zero Tsū; 31): Several months after its original defeat, Gan-Q was resurrected as a wandering ghost at a nearby city before Mato absorbed his descendant's power and further empowered it. As a result, Gan-Q was fully healed to the point of gaining blood vessel-like structures around its body and is capable of firing three eye probes in addition to its upgraded strength. After Shusaku's intervention, Gan-Q was reduced to its battered state long enough for Gaia to finish it.

Kijuro Mato is portrayed by Kimiaki Makino (牧野 公昭, Makino Kimiaki).

=== King of Mons ===
Strongest Combined Monster King of Mons (最強合体獣 キングオブモンス, Saikyō Gattai-jū Kingu Obu Monsu) (Note: Name is officially stated in Crunchyroll subtitle of Ultraman Orb episode 5. In the magazine, it was romanized as "King of Monster".) was designed and wished into existence by Hiroshi Kashimada after his will corrupted by the Red Sphere. Gamu/Gaia appeared in the midst of its rampage but the Ultra was no match for its strength, further weakened by the arrival of Basiliss and Sculla. It wasn't until Tsutomu wished for Tiga and Dyna to even the playing field and thus allowing Gaia to destroy King of Mons once its subordinates defeated. King of Mons returned 20 years later in The Adventure in Hyperspace novel, wherein it was revived by its three creators as a heroic force to defend their city from Kaiser Gyrares XIII. Unfortunately since the condition was different from their childhood, the King of Mons was easily decimated from Gyrares' attack.

King of Mons' signature attack is Cremate Beam (クレメイトビーム, Kuremeito Bīmu), firing a stream destructive laser from its mouth. Other attacks includes a pair Bone Wings (ボーンウイング, Bōn Uingu) that allow it to fly at Mach 7 or initiating defensive barrier Bone Shield (ボーンシールド, Bōn Shīrudo) and close combat tactics via Bone Tail (ボーンテール, Bōn Tēru) and Shark Fangs (シャークファング, Shāku Fangu) on its abdomen. As a result of Yu Hirama's corruption via the Red Sphere, the King of Mons can summon two other monsters that Hiroshi's friends designed earlier but would can also weaken the monster itself should the other two destroyed.

- Bone-Winged Super Monster Basiliss (骨翼超獣 バジリス, Kotsuyoku Chōjū Bajirisu): A monster designed by Wataru Kosugi and spawned from King of Mons' Bone Wings. It is capable of flying at the speed of Mach 10, rivaling those of Dyna Miracle Type's flying speed and ramming opponents with Basiliss Body Attack (バジリス・ボディアタック, Bajirisu Bodi Atakku). It is also armed with a pair of Scissor Arms (シザーアーム, Shizā Āmu) on its hands to pin enemies with Arm Clipper (アームクリッパー, Āmu Kurippā) and fires Barbary Ball (バルバリボール, Barubari Bōru) from its mouth. It engaged in a duel against Dyna in outer space and defeated by Empowered Solgent Ray.
- Big-Jaw Sea Monster Sculla (巨大顎海獣 スキューラ, Kyodai-ago Kaijū Sukyūra): A monster designed by Kohei Nakahara and spawned from King of Mons' Shark Fangs. It is capable of unveiling Secret Jaw (シークレットジョー, Shīkuretto Jō) and performing rush attack called Scullash (スキューラッシュ, Sukyūrasshu). Its running speed rivals that of Tiga Sky Type (Mach 2) and can swim at the speed of Mach 3. It engaged in a duel against Tiga in the ocean floor and was decimated by Zeperion Ray.

=== Kaiser Gyrares XIII ===
Space Vicious Beast Kaiser Gyrares XIII (宇宙凶獣 カイザーギラレス13世, Uchū Kyō-jū Kaizā Giraresu Jū-san-sei) is a monster that exclusively appear in the 2018 novel, Tiga, Dyna and Ultraman Gaia Novel: The Adventure in Hyperspace. It was created by Shunsuke Kuji as his entry for a monster modeling competition held by toy company Gigantes. After losing the competition as a result of implied nepotism, Kaiser Gyrares XIII was brought to life by the Red Sphere under Kuji's wish, who proceed to destroy an elementary school before disappearing from an attack made by Raputer drones by the Garland Foundation. Five hours later, Gyrares was resurrected in its full power and managed to destroy King of Mons and Gigantes toy company. Takeshi Yoshioka transforms into Ultraman Gaia and defeated the monster with Photon Edge after evolving into Version 2. Not content on giving up, Charija assimilated Gyrares' carcass with the cells of his defeated monster and resurrected it as Demon Gyrares XIV (デーモンギラレス14世, Dēmon Giraresu Jū-yon-sei). It proceed to attack the combined forces of Tiga, Dyna, Gaia, and both generations of GUTS and Super GUTS until Kraakov fired off its shield, giving all forces the chance of incinerating the monster.

From Shunsuke's in-fiction setting, Kaiser Gyrares XIII has served 13 generations of malevolent figures and destroyed countless civilizations. Its main weapon is a sword with a shield-hilt capable of reflecting incoming attacks and a mace for left hand. Its signature attack is a beam capable of taking down King of Mons in one shot. Once revived as Demon Gyrares XIV, it grew 3 times larger the original size, followed by a black body coloration and its face transformed into one described as "a demon crawling out of hell". Aside from a large eye on the back of its head, it also spew multiple tentacles and can regenerate dismembered body parts.

=== Charija ===
Space Demon Charija (宇宙魔人 チャリジャ, Uchū Majin Charija) in an extraterrestrial monster dealer from episode 49 of Ultraman Tiga and is the main antagonist of Tiga, Dyna and Ultraman Gaia Novel: The Adventure in Hyperspace. After capturing several monsters from various Ultra Series universe, Charija arrived in Tsutomu's world to aim for the Red Sphere and sent his monster armies in against Gaia and the Ultra Warriors. After Demon Gyrares XIV's destruction, Charija retreated and continue in his pursuit for the Red Sphere.

His captured monsters, used as his vanguards to secure the Red Sphere include:

- Ultla Ancient Monster Galra (超古代怪獣 ガルラ, Chō Kodai Kaijū Garura): A Ultla Ancient Monster whose skin is protected by the Counterattack Armor (カウンターアタックアーマー, Kauntā Atakku Āmā). Galra was obtained in the middle of the Shibito Zoigers' invasion across the globe. Galra was killed by the GUTS Wing 1 piloted by Daigo Madoka when it shot the monster's defenseless neck. First appeared in episode 39 of Ultraman Tiga.
- Super Space Synthetic Beast Neo Geomos (超宇宙合成獣 ネオジオモス, Chō Uchū Gōsei-jū Neo Jiomosu): The evolved version of Geomos and a Sphere Synthetic Beast from episode 36 of Ultraman Dyna. Due to the use of its shields, both Munakata and Koda combined their firepower to attack the horns, preventing Neo Geomos from using the same ability and allowing Gaia to kill it with Photon Edge.
- Hyperspace Wave Monster Psycho Mezard: See above
- Parasitic Spirit Beast Chaos-Jilark (精神寄生獣 カオスジラーク, Seishin Kisei-jū Kaosu Jirāku): A Chaos Monster born from the infusion of Chaos Header parasites and their illusory Flywhale Jilark, first appeared in episode 16 of Ultraman Cosmos. It fought against Ultraman Dyna in Strong Type, who proceed to toss the former towards an airborne Psycho Mezard before perishing at the simultaneous attack of Garnate Bomber Shooting Version and Tiga Sky Type's Runboldt Beam Shell.
- Fiendish Type Beast Nosferu (フィンディッシュタイプビースト ノスフェル, Findisshu Taipu Bīsuto Nosuferu): A rodent Space Beast with regenerative healing factor that first appeared in episode 11 of Ultraman Nexus. Charija kidnapped the monster in the middle of its fight with Night Raider operatives and upon deployment, it begins fighting Ultraman Gaia. Through Tsutomu's wish on the Red Sphere, GUTS and Super GUTS members materialized in the real world. Having survived and regenerate upon GUTS Wing 2's Dexus Beam, Nosferu begins targeting the GUTS Eagle until the aircraft splits into three. Asuka/GUTS Eagle Alpha took this opportunity to open fire on its throat, its main weakness and therefore destroying it.

== Other monsters and aliens ==
=== Earth monsters ===
- Hyperspace Energy Being Dragon in Vision (超空間エネルギー体 ヴィジョンの龍, Chō Kūkan Enerugī-tai Vijon no Ryū; 1): (Note: Also addressed as "Dragon in Gamu's Vision" via romanization. Other sources referred its name as "Underground Dragon" (地底の龍, Chitei no Ryū).) A snake-like monster which Gamu encounter during a virtual reality experiment to uncover the will of the Earth. The monster was quickly defeated by Gaia via Photon Edge.
- Magma Underground Monster Geel (マグマ怪地底獣 ギール, Maguma Kai Chiteijū Gīru; 2): An underground monster which was awakened by the arrival of C.O.V., possessing the ability to fire magma bullets from its stomach and has a durable hide. It rise to prominence from the same place the aforementioned monster land on and begins munching several buildings. After facing against the combined assaults of Team Lightning and Hercules, it fought against Gaia and defeated by Photon Edge.
  - Magma Underground Monster Geel II (マグマ怪地底獣 ギールII, Maguma Kai Chiteijū Gīru Tsū; 24): A same type of monster which Agul awakened to eradicate humanity, this variant sports a reddish hide. Seeing the hope of a patient has upon the Ultraman, Fujimiya was forced to use Agul in an injured state and successfully destroying it.
  - Magma Underground Monster Geel III (マグマ怪地底獣 ギールIII, Maguma Kai Chiteijū Gīru Surī; 51): The same variation of monster from Geel II, it was awakened in Siberia to fight against a horde of Dobishi and Kaiser Dobishi, perishing as a result of their relentless onslaught.
- Ocean Demon Bokrag (大海魔 ボクラグ, Dai Kaima Bokuragu; 5): A monster named after H.P. Lovecraft's Bokrug. It attacked Gamu's hometown and managed to evade detection from radar due to bearing the same chemical property as the sea. Aside from its regenerative factor, Bokrag can also utilize electrical attacks and absorbing life energy upon direct contact. When fighting against the Ultras, Bokrag met its end by Agul via Liquidator.
- Hyperspace Symbiotic Monster Crabgan & Anemosu (超空間共生怪獣 クラブガン&アネモス, Chō Kūkan Kyōsei Kaijū Kurabugan Ando Anemosu; 8): The combined form of Anemosu and Crabgan through symbiosis. Anemosu sprays the hypnotic gas for Crabgan to feed in human victims. Gaia separated the monsters back before finishing them via Photon Edge.
  - Hyperspace Symbiotic Monster Anemosu (超空間共生怪獣 アネモス, Chō Kūkan Kyōsei Kaijū Anemosu; 8): A sea anemone-like creature which lives since 500 million years from the Cambrian Era. It emerges in the modern era as a ghost due to Miku's own sympathy for said monster's extinction. As part of symbiosis with Crabgan, Anemosu secreted pheromone which attract a school of said monsters.
  - Hyperspace Symbiotic Monster Crabgan (超空間共生怪獣 クラブガン, Chō Kūkan Kyōsei Kaijū Kurabugan; 8): A crab-like monster that possess the same origin as Anemosu. A single Crabgan appeared and merged with Anemosu as part of their symbiosis. Although more Crabgans surfaced and try to reach Anemosu, its destruction caused the other swarm to vanish.
- Land Emperor Monster Mizunoeno Dragon (地帝大怪獣 ミズノエノリュウ, Chitei Dai Kaijū Mizunoeno Ryū; 11, 45, 50, 51): (Note: Kanji notation "壬龍" (Mizunoe Ryū; lit. "Invitation Dragon"). Also romanized as "Misunoenodragon".) An eight-headed guardian dragon of the Earth which lies under the vicinity of Tokyo. Its main attacks are Flash of Dragon (龍の閃光, Ryū no Senkō) energy beam, Eight Headed Violent Collision Light (八頭激衝光, Yatsugashira Gekishō-kō) energy bullet and Super Psychokinesis (超念動力, Chō Nendōryoku). Angered of Tokyo's civilization that disrupts its dragon veins, Mizunoeno Dragon begins to destroy critical infrastructures in hopes of restoring its strength. Using the Marunouchi underground passage, Team Hercules try to attack Mizunoeno Dragon but it only provoke the monster further enough to get into the surface. As it easily overpowers Gaia via telekinesis, Megumi's prayer managed to quell the dragon's anger as it return underground. During the Dobishi invasion, Mizunoeno Dragon fend itself against the invaders and cooperated with Mission Gaia to restore Gaia and Agul, going as far as to assist them when fighting Zogu in its Second-Form. It was last seen as a spiritual illusion from Gamu's view after he returns to Jonan University.
- Crustacean Underground Monster Zonnel (甲殻怪地底獣 ゾンネル, Kōkaku Kai Chitei-jū Zonneru; 17, 18): A monster with a biological fusion reactor on its back, which is as strong as the sun. Originally a peaceful monster, Fujimiya utilized Agul's power to awaken it and used his controller to manipulate Zonnel. When Diglobe is about to strike Earth, Agul opens its back abdomen long enough to destroy it, leaving said monster back to Mt. Biho.
  - Crustacean Underground Monster Zonnel II (甲殻怪地底獣 ゾンネルII, Kōkaku Kai Chitei-jū Zonneru Tsū; 24, 50, 51): A blue variation of Zonnel that appeared in Scottsdale, Arizona. After being awakened by Agul, Zonnel II went on a rampage until Gaia used Gaia Healing to calm it down, returning Zonnel to its original habitat until the arrival of Dobishi army, where it supported G.U.A.R.D. in Mission Gaia. In Once Again Gaia, Zonnel II awakened from the signs of Gakzom's arrival as Fujimiya attempted to return the monster back to sleep. G.U.A.R.D. forces open fire on said monster and this caused Fujimiya to be blamed for its awakening.
- Absolute Organism Geschenk (絶対生物 ゲシェンク, Zettai Seibutsu Geshenku; 20): Originally an organism from a preserved egg, it was awakened by Fujimiya to reduce the population of humanity by posing as Professor Sugai. Although Fujimiya managed to have Gamu restrained, he managed to escape and transforms into Gaia to conclude its threat with Photon Edge.
- Rigid-Armed Underground Monster Gomenos (剛腕怪地底獣 ゴメノス, Gōwan Kai Chitei-jū Gomenosu; 23): A monster that awakened from the Chichibu Mountains. Kyoko Inamori tried to manipulate Gomenos via Percel but the monster shrugs off and killed her. Gaia destroyed Gomenos with Photon Edge, at the same time avenge her death.
  - Rigid-Armed Underground Monster Gomenos II (剛腕怪地底獣 ゴメノスII, Gōwan Kai Chitei-jū Gomenosu Tsū; 50, 51): A monster of the same kind that appeared in Sydney. It fends off against the Dobishi army and donated its energy to revive Gaia and Agul.
- Legendary Mystical Beast Syazac (伝説魔獣 シャザック, Densetsu Majū Shazakku; 33, 50, 51): A monster which lives in the vicinity of Alberta, Canada with its cubs. It was regarded by the local as a god who ate intruders of the forest, although in reality, it was trying to protect its own nest. Catherine attempted to attack the monster through various weapons and bombs, although it managed to survive. When Gaia Supreme Version almost try to destroy it, Catherine stopped him and allow both the monster and its cub to left in peace. Syazac and the rest of its cubs reawakened during the Dobishi invasion as they faced against it and assisted in Mission Gaia by donating their energy to revive Gaia and Agul.
- Ancient Monster Algona (古代怪獣 アルゴナ, Kodai Kaijū Arugona; 35): Originally an egg of a transitional fossil from a carnivorous monster which was discovered in Antarctica. During the delivery, it emits acidic goo which caused itself to fall from a delivery jet and landed on Furuta Iron Works. Its workers and a local doctor try to ransom the egg back to G.U.A.R.D. as Alien Furuta but seeing the egg gets bigger, they decided to lure it towards the mountains, catching the attention of XIG and KCB. Once they managed to get it out from the city, Algona hatched and grabbed Kajio's XIG Fighter SS, attempting to eat him until Gaia appeared. Under Prof. Kyogoku's advice, Gaia freeze the monster via Gaia Blizzard and sent it back to Antarctica.
- Crust Underground Monster Alboom-Tigris (地殻怪地底獣 アルブームティグリス, Chikaku Kai Chitei-jū Arubūmu Tigurisu; 38): (Note: Shortened as Tigris (ティグリス, Tigurisu), or alternatively romanized as "Album Tigris".) An ancient monster that slept 1,500 m beneath the Tsumura Lake. Although protected by an enermous Earth energy, Tigris fell victim into Hiiragi's Underground Penetrate Nuclear Missile and surfaced in an injured state as it try to march towards its attacker before succumbing to its injuries. Gaia decided to return the corpse underground.
  - Crust Underground Monster Alboom-Tigris II (地殻怪地底獣 アルブームティグリスII, Chikaku Kai Chitei-jū Arubūmu Tigurisu Tsū; 45): A second variation, it possesses a pair of shorter tusks as distinction from the original. Awakened from Blitz-Blotz's arrival, Tigris II fought against in before Gaia interfered and continue to support him alongside G.U.A.R.D. and XIG forces. In aftermath of the battle, Tigris II died with its corpse standing up and was saluted by Hiiragi and XIG members.
  - Crust Underground Monster Alboom-Tigris III (地殻怪地底獣 アルブームティグリスIII, Chikaku Kai Chitei-jū Arubūmu Tigurisu Surī; 50, 51): A variation that is identical to Tigris II, it awakened in the mountains of Yamanashi Prefecture to fight against the Kaiser Dobishi.

=== Space monsters ===
- Metal Organisms (金属生命体, Kinzoku Seimei-tai): A term referred to sentient metal life forms which arrived on Earth. They acted as antithesis of their respective Ultra Warriors (to the point of mimicking their Life Gauges) and is capable of transforming parts of their anatomies into weapons. Both of their essence were collected and stored within Geo Base for further studies before Chrisis Ghost assimilated with them into Meemos.
  - Apatee (アパテー, Apatē; 3): (Note: Name is officially appeared in episode 16.) Attracted to the appearance of Ultraman Gaia, Apatee arrives on Earth but crashed the Middle East instead of Tokyo due to a shot from XIG Fighter. Apatee fought against Gaia and managed to weaken the red Ultra with its attacks until it was destroyed by Ultraman Agul.
  - Alguros (アルギュロス, Arugyurosu; 16): Attracted to the appearance of Ultraman Agul, Alguros appeared as four spears merged into a single body. Fighting against Agul at the outskirt of Pronone Caramos, Alguros used its MetamorArm (メタモルアーム, Metamoru Āmu) to change its hands into weapons before mimicking the appearance of Agul.
    - Imit-Ultraman Agul (ニセ・ウルトラマンアグル, Nise Urutotraman Aguru; 16): While clashing with Agul, Alguros transforms into an impostor of its own opponent, to the point of copying his attacks. It was destroyed shortly when clashing their Photon Crushers.
- Photothermal Manastone Rezaito (光熱魔石 レザイト, Kōnetsu Maseki Rezaito; 9): A monster that descends to Tokyo in its crystalline form. Because of its density and heat, Rezaito slowly sinks underground and nearly caused almost the entire Kanto region to sink had not for Team Lightning's nitrogen liquid missile. After Team Seagull rescued all victims, Gaia appeared and defeated the monster with Photon Edge.
- Beastman Wolfgas (獣人 ウルフガス, Jūjin Urufugasu; 12): A life form which emerges after a strange capsule descends to Tokyo from space. The Wolfgas went active during the night and turn into gas substance by day due to its modified genetic. After being shot with an anesthesia, Wolfgas' genetic once more adapted to absorb other gas to enlarge and fought against Agul before Gaia interfered, allowing Team Lightning to fire with a special bullet that revert Wolfgas into its gaseous form. Gaia would later send Wolfgas back to space in a gas container. The Wolfgas is themed after werewolf and the titular character of The Human Vapor.
  - Cyborg Beastman Wolffire (サイボーグ獣人 ウルフファイヤー, Saibōgu Jūjin Urufufaiyā; 34): The same type of Wolfgas, with the addition of the red color. Their body performances were enhanced by a Physicality Enhancement Chip (身体能力強化チップ, Shintai Nōryoku Kyōka Chippu) developed by an alien saucer, who attempted to have human victims planted with the same chip for experiment. XIG members managed to destroy several Wolffire as one escaped and enlarged until Gaia destroyed it via Photon Stream. The alien saucer was destroyed by Team Lightning in a futile attempt to escape.
- Antimatter Monster Anti Matter (反物質怪獣 アンチマター, Han Busshitsu Kaijū Anchimatā; 14): Coming from a wormhole in Jupiter trojan, this monster's physiology bears the namesake of its antimatter material. Through the Antimatter Converter Shield (反物質化シールド, Han Busshitsu-ka Shīrudo), it begins to consume Ohata city and try to initiate a second Big Bang to recreate the universe. Gaia (converted into antimatter by Agul) entered the barrier and fought against Anti Matter by destroying its horns, followed by Team Falcon's Anti-Anti Matter beams which allows the reduction of the Antimatter Shield before Agul seals the leak. Gaia would later return Anti Matter to the same wormhole it came from and return to normal.
- Super Gigantic Astrobiology Diglobe (超巨大天体生物 ディグローブ, Chō Kyodai Tentai Seibutsu Digurōbu; 17, 18): A life form with the size of a celestial body which was first sighted near Jupiter. Its original route is to travel pass the Earth in 98 hours but suddenly changed its course to hit the planet in 72 minutes. It was destroyed by Zonnel when Agul opened the fusion reactor from its abdomen.
- Space Monster Gokigumon (宇宙怪獣 ゴキグモン, Uchū Kaijū Gokigumon; 30): Emerges from the far side of the Moon, the monster is themed after arthropod insects and receives its name from Gamu when combining the Japanese words for "cockroaches" (ゴキブリ, Gokiburi) and "spiders" (クモ, Kumo). Gokigumon manages to evade Team Lightning with Sonic Boom flight and made a nest on Tokyo to house its eggs. While building said nest, it accidentally took Ritsuko and a little girl with it. Team Seagull managed to launch as anesthesia on the monster, but the rescue mission was forced to abandon Ritsuko on the tower when its effect ran out. In an attempt to destroy the eggs, Team Lightning almost destroy its tower before Gaia interfered (yet trapped in the same webbing) and Gokigumon reflected the bullet. After escaping his capture, Gaia assumed Supreme Version to eliminate Gokigumon while Kajio rescued Ritsuko and for the rest of Team Lightning to destroy the nest.

=== Others ===
- Bizarre Life Mother Deents (奇怪生命 マザーディーンツ, Kikai Seimei Mazā Dīntsu; 15): A monster on Hayami City, created when green raindrops phenomenon came in contact with the illegally-disposed artificial organs. Her main ability is to feed on the organic matter of her targets, turning them into liquids while retaining conscious and produced other smaller Deents. As she and her children being nocturnal, Tsutsumi led a troop of G.U.A.R.D. officers with him to attack her base, forcing Mother Deents to enlarge after her children's demise. While fighting against Gaia, Reiko revealed that Mother Deents' essence can be used to heal all victims, as the Ultra obliged by destroying the monster. She is voiced by Fushigi Yamada (山田 ふしぎ, Yamada Fushigi).
  - Bizarre Life Deents (奇怪生命 ディーンツ, Kikai Seimei Dīntsu; 15): Smaller versions of Mother Deents created from its own secretion. They went on a hunting spree by night as Tsutsumi's G.U.A.R.D. troops eliminated them at their base by the next day. They are voiced by Fushigi Yamada.
- Anoxic Sea Creature Candea (無酸素海獣 カンデア, Mu Sanso Kaijū Kandea; 21): Originally a group of bacteria which existed way before the presence of oxygen on Earth, illegal waste disposal made in 8 years prior cause them to mutate into a giant monster, bend on terminating oxygen. During Team Marlin's investigation, Candea attacked the Siren 7500 before Gaia arrived and destroy the monster with Photon Edge.
- Guardian Beast Ruku (守護獣 ルクー, Shugo-jū Rukū; 29): (Note: Also called as Rukulion (ルクーリオン, Rukūrion).) A monster which heralds from a flying city named Uqbar (ウクバール, Ukubāru), named after the short story Tlön, Uqbar, Orbis Tertius from that was written by Jorge Luis Borges. Nagata, a senior citizen, always dream of returning to Uqbar and eventually gets his wish when Ruku called him home.
- Spacetime Monster Aeroviper (時空怪獣 エアロヴァイパー, Jikū Kaijū Earovaipā; 32): A time-travelling monster which jumps through timeline via a wormhole. When Team Falcon went to one of the possible futures, they discovered their deaths after performing suicidal attacks on Aeroviper. Gamu however convinces them to change the future through the theory of Schrödinger's cat, as he transforms into Gaia and destroy said monster. By the time return to the present day, Aeroviper vanished in its scheduled attack on the Aerial Base.
- Mud Phantom Tsuchikera (泥怪人 ツチケラ, Doro Kaijin Tsuchikera; 39): Originally a Pacific War scientist named Kondo (近藤, Kondō), he was administered with an artificial bacteria which transforms him into a monster. After attacking the soldiers that were responsible for his mutation, Tsuchikera hid within the Nazure Village swamp for years, watching his old friend Hirano taking care of his daughter Chie before she died in an air raid. In the present day, Tsuchikera's presence in the swamp caught the attention of XIG to investigate. To make things worse, leftover toxic waste from the Underground Penetrate Nuclear Missiles used to attack Tigris prior caused Tsuchikera to grow large on a rampaging spree until Gaia Supreme Version purified said monster, allowing Kondo's spirit to pass on to afterlife while thanking his old friend for his dedication. Kondo is portrayed by Masashi Oka (岡 真志, Oka Masashi).
- Altes Tiger Monster Izac Platiard (アルテスタイガー怪獣 イザクプラチアード, Arutesu Taigā Kaijū Izaku Purachiādo; 43): Originally the endling of Altes Tiger species, Izac was distinctively known for its silver eyes and had spent its final moments fending off against various poachers. In the present day, researchers from Iwakura Foundation Natural Science and Research Institute (岩倉財団自然科学研究所, Iwakura Zaidan Shizen Kagaku Kenkyū-jo) managed to revive Izac through cloning, only to be kidnapped and remodeled into a monster by Radical Destruction Bringer. Unlike most monsters, Izac retained its free will and fight for the sake of survival as Agul refused to attack said monster due to the understanding of its hatred. However it also puts humanity's life in peril due to its instinct, as well as the ideology of how both humanity and the Radical Destruction Bringer were the same. Wanting to destroy the sources of its water contamination, Izac targeted several oil refineries and progressed to Kawasaki. Gaia assumed Gaia Supreme Version and managed to destroy Izac with Supreme Kick.
  - Altes Tiger (アルテスタイガー, Arutesu Taigā; 43): An extinct race of tigers that were known for their beauty and formerly resided the Altes forest. After their forest were invaded by mankind due to a nearby oil farm, the entire species went scattered and hunted down by poachers for their fur and bones.
- Phantom Monster Deep Ones (幻影怪物 魚人, Gen'ei Kaibutsu Gyojin; 49, 50): A group of illusive fish-like ghosts that roam around the city in response to the Dobishi invasion.
- Stray Creature Hanejiro (迷子珍獣 ハネジロー, Maigo Chinjū Hanejirō): A recurring character from Ultraman Dyna who appears in the bonus video Set! Ultra 3 Great Warrior Movie Gaia's Secret. Hanejiro brought Ryo and Nakajima into Aerial Base and meeting Gamu to explain the exploits of Ultraman Gaia. At the end of the special, Hanejiro returned the two to the world of Neo Frontier. When equipped with the translator that Nakajima built, Hanejiro is voiced by Junko Aoki (青木 順子, Aoki Junko).
- Deep-Sea Life Form Rinar (深海生命体 リナール, Shinkai Seimei-tai Rināru; OV): A race of advanced plankton-like species who build their civilization within Celephais trench 8,000 meters below sea level. When Gakzom attacked their environment, they sent a distress signal which picked the attention of XIG while one of them, Melissa (メリッサ, Merissa), went to the surface and restore Agul's light in Fujimiya's Agulater. When Gakzom went to attack the Tokyo Bay, they restore Gaia's light before supporting the Ultra Warriors in their battle. Melissa's human form is portrayed by Jasmine Allen (ジャスミン・アレン, Jasumin Aren).
- Love and Hatred Warrior Camearra (愛憎戦士 カミーラ, Aizō Senshi Kamīra; Novel): A Giant of Darkness and the major antagonist of Ultraman Tiga: The Final Odyssey. While riding the XIG Adventure to reach Daigo Madoka, Tsutomu found himself in the middle of GUTS's campaign against the Giants of Darkness. Seeing Tiga being pinned down by Camearra, Tsutomu distracted Camearra long enough for Tiga to deliver his counterattack.
- Space Sea Monster Reicubas (宇宙海獣 レイキュバス, Uchū Kaijū Reikyubasu; Novel): While riding the XIG Adventure, Tsutomu arrived in the middle of Super GUTS's campaign against Spume and Reicubas (episodes 25-26 of Ultraman Dyna). The monster made its brief appearance during Tsutomu's attempt to reach out for Shin Asuka's help.

== Other characters ==
- Sato (サトウ, Satō), Makoto (マコト), and Nakaji (ナカジ): Gamu's friends at Jonan University. Sato is a playboy who comes from a family of five that runs a resort while Makoto is Gamu's right-hand man and Nakaji being a realist in sunglasses. When Gamu's identity as Gaia were exposed by KCB, the three helped him by hiding from several mobs. They are portrayed by Togo Okumoto (奥本 東五, Okumoto Tōgo), Hiroaki Nishijima (西嶋 大明, Nishijima Hiroaki) and Masashi Kagami (加々美 正史, Kagami Masashi) respectively.
- Shigemi Takayama (高山 重美, Takayama Shigemi): Gamu's mother. She is principle of laissez-faire to Gamu and started to use e-mail to communicate with him during his involvement with XIG. Compared to her husband, she is more open to Gamu when hi identity as Gaia is exposed. She is portrayed by Aki Mizusawa (水沢 アキ, Mizusawa Aki).
- Yuiichi Takayama (高山 唯一, Takayama Yuiichi): Gamu's father. He is working as a caseworker in the city office. Initially astonished by his son being Gaia, Yuiichi eventually shows support on Gamu's final battle against Zogu. He is portrayed by Sen Yamamoto (山本 亘, Yamamoto Sen).
- Kyoko Inamori (稲森 京子, Inamori Kyōko; 16, 23): A 30-year-old scientist who helped develop Chrisis with Fujimiya; also a romantic interest of his who died in a failed attempt to manipulate Gomenos. In episode 37, the Queen Mezard used her image to deceive Fujimiya until he managed to overcome the deception. The notes left by her allows Fujimiya to reactivate Chrisis and restore communications after being jammed by Dobishi. She is portrayed by Makiko Kuno (クノ 真季子, Kuno Makiko).
- Ritsuko Sasaki (佐々木 律子, Sasaki Ritsuko; 19, 30, 46): Atsuko's 27-year-old elder sister. Her husband was a pilot who died fighting the C.O.V. After an incident being trapped within Gokigumon, she started to develop feelings for Kajio, Atsuko's senior in XIG. She is portrayed by Azusa Sawamura (沢村 亜津佐, Sawamura Azusa).
- Megumi Kuroda (黒田 恵, Kuroda Megumi): The 27-year-old feng shui master who can sense Mizunoeno Dragon's intentions and the elder sister of Tabata's friend. She is portrayed by Tomoko Ōtakara (大寶 智子, Ōtakara Tomoko).
- Yuichi Sugai (須貝 裕一, Sugai Yūichi; 20, 37): An assistant professor doing research on ancient organisms. After being impersonated by Fujimiya and discredited from Geshenk's rampage, Sugai was reassigned to Antarctica where he discovered the Algona egg before returning to Japan. He is portrayed by Masakazu Migita (右田 昌万, Migita Masakazu).
- Yuki (ユキ; 20, 37, 46): A 7-year-old girl who Fujimiya rescues during Geschenk's attack; she runs into him frequently after the rescue. She is portrayed by Ai Hasunuma (蓮沼 藍, Hasunuma Ai).
- Kōki (弘希; 22, 25): Tatsumi Chiba's 13-year-old nephew, whose interested with viewing the starts through his telescope. He is portrayed by Shōhei Ōta (太田 翔平, Ōta Shōhei).
- Shimizu (清水): A delivery man from the company Rakuda-bin (らくだ便). He appeared once fighting against Wolfgas but gets injured in his right cheek. The second time he challenged the Wolffire but receive a scar from his left cheek. Even after appearing till the final episode, both of his cheeks never healed. He is portrayed by Kazuya Shimizu (清水 一哉, Shimizu Kazuya), the suit actor of Ultraman Gaia and Agul.
- Professor Kyogoku (京極博士, Kyōgoku-hakase): A researcher who volunteers in aiding for Algona's research. He is portrayed by Takashi Tsumura (津村 鷹志, Tsumura Takashi), who previously portrayed Tetsuya Kitajima in Ultraman Taro.
- Alien Furuta (フルータ星人, Furūta Seijin; 35): A group consists of three Furuta Iron Works (古田鉄工所, Furuta Tekkō-jo) workers and Ogino. Having stumbled upon the Algona egg, they took the alias of Alien Furuta to force GUARD into paying a ransom money for the monster egg until it hatches.
  - President: The unnamed superstitious president of the Furuta Iron Works who came up with the suggestion to ransom the Algona egg in order to revitalize his failing factory. He is portrayed by Sabu Kawahara (河原 さぶ, Kawahara Sabu).
  - Yukio (幸男) and Takeshi (武): The president's remaining employees at his factory. They are portrayed by Takuya Yamano (山野 拓也, Yamano Takuya) and Masaki Naitō (内藤 正樹, Naitō Masaki) of the owarai duo Blackpiner SOS.
  - Ogino (薮野): The owner of his namesake clinic with knowledge of feng shui, who participated in Algona's egg ransom to revitalize his business. He is portrayed by Toshiki Ayata (綾田 俊樹, Ayata Toshiki).
- Imada (今田; 46): The guru of a cult that praises Radical Destruction Bringer. Even after being injured by Shinryoku, he still continues the group. He is portrayed by the comedian Koji Imada (今田 耕司, Imada Kōji).
- Ryo Yumimura (ユミムラ・リョウ, Yumimura Ryō) and Tsutomu Nakajima (ナカジマ・ツトム, Nakajima Tsutomu): A pair of Super GUTS members from Ultraman Dyna who appeared in the bonus video Set! Ultra 3 Great Warrior Movie Gaia's Secret. Hanejiro brought the two to the Aerial Base where Gamu Takayama explains the exploits of Tiga, Dyna and Gaia before the two were returned to the Neo Frontier universe. In The Adventure in Hyperspace novel, Ryo and Nakajima were among the summoned Super GUTS members assigned to fight against Charija's forces and assisting the three Ultras in against Demon Gyrares XIV. Risa Saito (斉藤 りさ, Saitō Risa) and Joe Onodera (小野寺 丈, Onodera Jō) reprise their roles as Ryo and Nakajima respectively.

Movies and novel

- Yū Hirama (平間 優, Hirama Yū): A genius and Tsutomu's classmate. After grabbing the Red Sphere by accident, Yū was corrupted by the ball and caused Basiliss and Sculla to be spawned out from the King of Mons until Tsutomu knocked it over. 20 years later in The Adventure in Hyperspace, Yū joined the Garland Foundation, a group of young prodigies akin to Alchemy Stars as they reconstruct the XIG Adventure for Tsutomu to reach Gamu in the middle of Kaiser Gyrares XIII's attack by Shunsuke Kuji. He is portrayed by Miyu Irino (入野 自由, Irino Miyu).
- Hiroshi Kashimada (鹿島田 浩, Kashimada Hiroshi): One of the antagonists of The Battle in Hyperspace. With Kohei and Wataru, Hiroshi is a year older than Tsutomu and is also a fan of Ultra Series, but his passion lies on the appearing monsters. After accidentally summoning Satan Bizor he uses the stolen Red Sphere and was corrupted into summoning King of Mons to lay waste on his hometown. He regained his senses after Tsutomu knocked the Red Sphere from his hand and despite the entire world being reset, he and his circle of friends kept their memories and had since bury the hatchet with Tsutomu. 20 years later in The Adventure in Hyperspace novel, Hiroshi received the job of working at a garage kit designing company Uchudo and helped stalling Kaiser Gyrares XIII with the revived King of Mons. He is portrayed by Yūta Satō (佐藤 雄太, Satō Yūta).
- Kōhei Nakahara (中原 耕平, Nakahara Kōhei): The muscle of Hiroshi's circle and Sculla's designer. 20 years later in The Adventure of Hyperspace, he worked in a printing company. He is portrayed by Hiroto Takimoto (滝本 啓人, Takimoto Hiroto).
- Wataru Kosugi (小杉 亘, Kosugi Wataru): The yes man of Hiroshi, who designed Basiliss. In The Adventure in Hyperspace, Wataru ran his grandfather's liquor store Basiliss after failing in his initial business as a monster figure owner. He is portrayed by Yūki Sugita (杉田 祐紀, Sugita Yūki).
- Takeshi Yoshioka: The real-life actor of Gamu Takayama in Tsutomu's world. 20 years after the Red Sphere incident, Takeshi saw his past association to the Ultra Series with full regret and portrayed as an antagonist at a drama's filming scene during Tsutomu's coincidental patrol. Although he scoffed Tsutomu's inability to move on from being an Ultraman fan, he apologized not long after when witnessing the Garland Foundation's replica of XIG Adventure. While Kaiser Gyrares XIII was rampaging on Tsutomu's housing area, Takeshi's resolute to save a young girl caused him to grab an Esplender toy that eventually linked him to Gamu Takayama from the fictional universe, therefore becoming Gaia and fighting Charija's forces altogether with Tiga and Dyna's help.
- Shunsuke Kuji (久地 俊介, Kuji Shunsuke; Novel): A modeler from the same department as Hiroshi, having a skill that is recognized by his coworkers. He applied for the monster modeling contest ran by Gigantes and submitted his entry, Kaiser Gyrares XIII but despite his victory, a series of misfortune caused him to be revoked from the title and being given to the son of a television station director. Furious over the nepotism and injustice he endured, Shunsuke wished upon the Red Sphere to summon Kaiser Gyrares and prevent anyone from summoning Ultraman. With the destruction of Demon Gyrares XIV, Shunsuke and the others retained their memories when time had been reversed. At some point of time, Shunsuke received an apology from Gigantes and regretted for allowing his childhood passion into using the Red Sphere for selfish purposes.
