= Ultraman Gaia: The Battle in Hyperspace =

- Directed by: Kazuya Konaka
- Written by: Keiichi Hasegawa
- Starring: Takeshi Yoshioka; Gaku Hamada; Mai Saitō
- Music by: Toshihiko Sahashi
- Production company: Tsuburaya Productions
- Distributed by: Shochiku
- Release date: March 6, 1999
- Running time: 74 minutes
- Country: Japan
- Language: Japanese

Ultraman Gaia: The Battle in Hyperspace (ウルトラマンガイア 超時空の大決戦, Urutoraman Gaia: Chō Jikū no Dai Kessen), also known as Ultramen Tiga, Dyna & Gaia: The Battle in Hyperspace (ウルトラマンティガ・ウルトラマンダイナ&ウルトラマンガイア 超時空の大決戦, Urutoraman Tiga Urutoraman Daina ando Urutoraman Gaia: Chō Jikū no Dai Kessen), is a 1999 Japanese superhero kaiju tokusatsu film produced by Tsuburaya Productions. It is a sequel to the previous year's Ultraman Tiga & Ultraman Dyna: Warriors of the Star of Light and became second in a successful Ultra Series. This film is the only theatrical spinoff of the Ultraman Gaia TV series.

== Plot ==
In a change from previous Ultraman movies, this takes place in the real world, in which Ultraman Gaia is just a popular kids' TV show.

A young boy named Tsutomu Niiboshi, is failing in school from his obsession to Ultraman Gaia. One day, while watching an Ultraman Gaia episode, he gets teleported into hyperspace where he sees a girl and behind her a scene of mass destruction. He later sees that same girl, named Lisa Nanase, in his class. Later on, he finds a mysterious glowing ball (Also from the dream) that tells him it can make any wish come true. The one thing Tsutomu wants more than anything else is to meet Gamu Takayama, Ultraman Gaia's human host. After his wish is granted, Gamu actually appears, but a bully takes the ball and makes the second wish; for a Kaiju, Satan Bizor, to fight Gamu. After Gamu transforms into Ultraman Gaia, he finds he is losing power quickly, but manages to defeat the Kaiju regardless. Afterwards, reverting into Gamu, he is chased by kids through the neighborhood until he finally manages to elude them by hiding in a toy shop. Once inside though, Tsutomu and his friends find Gamu and Tsutomu explains to Gamu just how he was brought to their world. Tsutomu tries hiding Gamu in an abandoned hangar, and during this time, Gamu sees that Tsutomu has a present for Lisa, a book called "Gulliver's Travels", which was a favorite of Gamu's as a child. While scanning the ball for the answers, not only do the police find him, but Gamu suddenly finds himself back in his own world, and accidentally takes the book with him. He is soon able to recall the events and checks the data he scanned from the ball, and gets a vision telling him that Tsutomu's world will soon be destroyed.

Unfortunately, during the whole ordeal, Tsutomu loses the ball, and the bully finds the wishing ball and wishes for a Kaiju to appear. King of Mons is created and starts destroying their suburban Tokyo neighborhood. Gamu becomes determined to open a gateway between the two universes to stop the Kaiju and save the world Tsutomu lives in. Gamu is soon able to find his way there with the aid of a new mecha, the XIG Adventure, and transforms into Gaia to battle the Kaiju. Soon, Gaia is in a deadly battle against the Kaiju. The Kaiju then summons two more Kaijus that are equally as strong as the original, one whose specialty is in water and the other whose specialty is sky. Tsutomu, knowing that Gaia is in trouble, tries to wish for help only to be sent flying into the air by one of the Kaiju's stray beams. Just as all seems lost he is rescued by Ultraman Tiga and Ultraman Dyna, who have come via "The Light" into the battle to help Gaia. The three Ultramen battle the Kaijus. Tiga and Dyna destroy King of Mons' minions. Gaia manages to obliterate King of Mons with a highly powerful laser blast and saves the day. Gaia then turns back into Gamu and reveals Lisa's secret to Tsutomu: She is the human-interface of the ball. Even though Lisa will disappear forever, she urges Tsutomu to wish for the ball to vanish forever, repairing all of the damage that had been caused by it to that world. Before returning to his world, Gamu returns Tsutomu's book to him and tells him "Thanks to this book, we were able to meet again."

At the end of the film, Tsutomu relives the day Lisa appeared in his class, but is unable to recall the events of this film. During the credits, though, as he shows Lisa the book, there is an autograph and a message to him from Gamu, as he sees the XIG Fighter EX flying through the air before disappearing.

== Cast ==
- Gamu Takayama (高山 我夢, Takayama Gamu): Takeshi Yoshioka (吉岡 毅志, Yoshioka Takeshi)
- Tsutomu Niiboshi (新星 勉, Niiboshi Tsutomu): Gaku Hamada (濱田 岳, Hamada Gaku)
- Lisa Nanase (七瀬 リサ, Nanase Risa): Mai Saitō (斉藤 麻衣, Saitō Mai)
- Yū Hirama (平間 優, Hirama Yū): Miyu Irino (入野 自由, Irino Miyu)
- Hiroshi Kashimada (鹿島田 浩, Kashimada Hiroshi): Yūta Satō (佐藤 雄太, Satō Yūta)
- Wataru Kosugi (小杉 亘, Kosugi Wataru): Yūki Sugita (杉田 祐紀, Sugita Yūki)
- Kōhei Nakahara (中原 耕平, Nakahara Kōhei): Hiroto Takimoto (滝本 啓人, Takimoto Hiroto)
- Teacher: Risa Junna (純名 里沙, Jun'na Risa)
- Police force captain: Bengaru (ベンガル)
- Police officer in the schoolyard: Isamu Ago (アゴ イサム, Ago Isamu)
- Police officer at the barn: Noumaru Abe (阿部 能丸, Abe Nōmaru)
- Classmates: Hayato Suzuki (鈴木 隼人, Suzuki Hayato), Yōhei Shimomura (下村 洋平, Shimomura Yōhei), Shō Imai (今井 翔, Imai Shō)
- Children on the Fighter: Hideki Miyashita (宮下 英樹, Miyashita Hideki), Kamahiro Nakano (中野 鎌博, Nakano Kamahiro), Shinya Kumaichi (熊市 真也, Kumaichi Shin'ya)
- Tatsumi Chiba (千葉 辰巳, Chiba Tatsumi): Sei Hiraizumi (平泉 成, Hiraizumi Sei)
- Atsuko Sasaki (佐々木 敦子, Sasaki Atsuko): Ai Hashimoto (橋本 愛, Hashimoto Ai)
- Georgie Leland (ジョジー・リーランド, Jojī Rīrando): Maria Theresa Gow (マリア・テレサ・ガウ, Maria Teresa Gau)
- Toy shop owner: Masashi Tashiro (田代 まさし, Tashiro Masashi)
- Tsutomu's mother: Kazuko Kato (かとう かずこ, Katō Kazuko)
- Akio Ishimuro (石室 章雄, Ishimuro Akio): Hiroyuki Watanabe (渡辺 裕之, Watanabe Hiroyuki)

=== Voice actors ===
- Satan Bizor (サタンビゾー, Satan Bizō): Daisuke Gōri (郷里 大輔, Gōri Daisuke)
- Red Sphere (赤い球, Akai Tama): Nana Yamaguchi (山口 奈々, Yamaguchi Nana)
- PAL: Kazuhiko Watanabe (渡辺 和彦, Watanabe Kazuhiko)
- Ultraman Tiga (ウルトラマンティガ, Urutoraman Tiga): Yūji Machi (真地 勇志, Machi Yūji)
- Ultraman Dyna (ウルトラマンダイナ, Urutoraman Daina): Takeshi Tsuruno (つるの 剛士, Tsuruno Takeshi)

== Theme song ==
- "Ultraman Gaia!" (ウルトラマンガイア!) by Masayuki Tanaka (田中 昌之) & Kazuya Daimon (大門 一也)

== U.S. release ==
This movie was released on Region 1 DVD by Image Entertainment on May 14, 2002.
