= Takeshi Yoshioka =

Japanese actor

- 吉岡 毅志
- Born: January 2, 1978 (age 48); Shinjuku, Tokyo, Japan
- Other name: Takeshi Man
- Occupation: Actor
- Years active: 1997–present
- Agents: Queen's Ave-α (1997–2007); 10-Point
- Known for: Ultraman Gaia; Ultraman Gaia: The Battle in Hyperspace; Superior Ultraman 8 Brothers
- Height: 1.7 m (5 ft 7 in)
- Spouses: Aiko (m. 2009–2014); Misato Hirata (m. 2015–2018)
- Website: Official website

Takeshi Yoshioka (吉岡 毅志, Yohioka Takeshi; born March 22, 1979, in Shinjuku, Tokyo, Japan) is a Japanese actor.

== Biography ==
Yoshioka's acting career started in 1997, and he played the protagonist Gamu Takayama in Ultraman Gaia from 1998 to 1999. On 2002, Yoshioka was part of a limited tokusatsu actor unit, Hero730. On August 31, 2007, he left Queen's Ave-α. Yoshioka is currently affiliated with 10-Point. He later reprised his role as Gamu Takayama/Ultraman Gaia in the film Superior Ultraman 8 Brothers for the first time in seven years on 2008. On October 10, 2009, Yoshioka announced on his blog that he married Flip-Flap member Aiko. They later divorced on October 10, 2014. On July 4, 2015, Yoshioka later announced in his blog that he married Ultraman Mebius actress Misato Hirata.

== Filmography ==
=== TV series ===
Year	Title	Role	Network	Notes
1997	Ushiro no Hyakutarō		TV Tokyo	
1998	Ultraman Gaia	Gamu Takayama/Ultraman Gaia	TBS	Lead role
2006	Sengoku Jieitai: Sekigahara no Tatakai	Minoru Kawagoe	NTV	
2006	CA to Oyobi!		NTV	
2007	Tokumei Kakarichō Hitoshi Tadano		TV Asahi	Episode 23
2008	Hanai Yumegoromo		Fuji TV	
2013	Ultraman Retsuden	Gamu Takayama	TV Tokyo	Episodes 80 to 83, 95, and 96
2017	Ultraman Orb: The Origin Saga	Gamu Takayama/Ultraman Gaia	Amazon Prime	Episodes 8 to 12

=== Films ===
Year	Title	Role	Notes
1999	Ultraman Gaia: The Battle in Hyperspace	Gamu Takayama/Ultraman Gaia	
2003	The Big Slaughter Club	Tsuyoshi	
2003	Heat	Kimu	
	Minami no Teiō		
2008	Superior Ultraman 8 Brothers	Gamu Takayama/Ultraman Gaia	
2015	Ultraman Ginga S The Movie	Ultraman Gaia (voice)	

=== Stage ===
Year	Title	Role	Notes
2001	Ultraman Festival 2001 Live Stage	Ultraman Gaia (voice)	
2001	Princess Knight	Jack	
2009	Sakusha o Sekasu Roku-ri no Shujinkō-tachi	Bandesu	
