= Masayuki Tanaka =

Japanese singer (born 1951)

- 田中 昌之
- Born: June 30, 1951 (age 74); Imari, Saga, Japan
- Occupation: Singer

Masayuki Tanaka (田中 昌之, Tanaka Masayuki; June 30, 1951) is a Japanese singer. He was born in Imari, Saga Prefecture. He is one of the two original vocalists of the band Crystal King (クリスタルキング, Kurisutaru Kingu), known for their anime soundtracks such as Fist of the North Star (北斗の拳, Hokuto no Ken) where Tanaka provided the vocals in the chorus of its opening theme. After leaving Crystal King, he started a solo career but lost his voice after being struck in the throat by a baseball and was never able to regain his original vocal range. In the late 1990s and early 2000s, he worked on the soundtracks of the tokusatsu series Ultraman Gaia (ウルトラマンガイア, Urutoraman Gaia) and Kamen Rider Kuuga (仮面ライダークウガ, Kamen Raidā Kūga). He is also featured on the Katamari Damacy soundtrack Katamari Fortissimo Damacy where he sings "Katamari on the Rock" (塊オンザロック, Katamari on za Rokku), the main theme of the game.

Tanaka has had his name variably written as 田中昌之 and 田中雅将 in his career, before choosing 田中雅之 in 2004, and then switching back to his birth name kanji in 2013.

Masayuki rerecorded on one of his greatest hits, Kamen Rider Kuuga's theme song with Rider Chips for the release of Heisei Kamen Rider 20 Titles Commemoration Best, which was released on May 1, 2019.

== Discography (As a soloist) ==
- "Ultraman Gaia!" (ウルトラマンガイア!, Urutoraman Gaia!; with Kazuki Daimon) - 1998
- "Power of Gaia" (ガイアノチカラ, Gaia no Chikara; with Kazuki Daimon) - 1998
- "Kamen Rider Kuuga!" (仮面ライダークウガ!, Kamen Raidā Kūga!) - 2000
- "TRY & CHASE" - 2000
- "Red Desire" - 2000
- "THE MASKED RIDER KUUGA!" - 2001
- "Katamari on the Rock: Main Theme" (塊オンザロック～メインテーマ, Katamari on za Rokku ~Mein Tēma) - 2004
- "Kamen Rider Kuuga! (Heisei Best Recording ver.)" (仮面ライダークウガ！ （平成ベストレコーディングver, Kamen Raidā Kūga!; with RIDER CHIPS) - 2019
