= Ultraman Gaia =

1998 Japanese TV series

- Title card
- Genre: Superhero; Tokusatsu; Sci-Fi; Kyodai Hero
- Created by: Tsuburaya Productions
- Developed by: Chiaki J. Konaka; Naoyuki Edo
- Directed by: Hirochika Muraishi
- Starring: Takeshi Yoshioka; Hassei Takano
- Opening theme: Ultraman Gaia! by Masayuki Tanaka & Kazuya Daimon
- Ending theme: Lovin' You Lovin' Me by B.B. WAVES; Beat on Dream on by Tomohiko Kikuda
- Composer: Toshihiko Sahashi
- Country of origin: Japan
- No. of episodes: 51

Production
- Running time: 24 minutes (per episode)
- Production companies: Tsuburaya Productions; Mainichi Broadcasting System

Original release
- Network: JNN (MBS, TBS)
- Release: September 5, 1998 – August 28, 1999

Related
- Ultraman Dyna; Ultraman Neos

Ultraman Gaia (ウルトラマンガイア, Urutoraman Gaia) is a Japanese tokusatsu TV show and is the tenth entry (fourteenth overall) in the Ultra Series. Featuring Chiaki J. Konaka as series composer and produced by Tsuburaya Productions and Mainichi Broadcasting System (MBS TV), Ultraman Gaia was aired on JNN TV stations (TBS, CBC, MBS, etc.) from September 5, 1998 until August 28, 1999, with a total of 51 episodes.

== Overview ==
Ultraman Gaia takes place in yet another universe, one that is different from the world of the Shōwa era Ultramen (Ultraman to Ultraman 80), as well as the world of Ultraman Tiga and Ultraman Dyna. In a departure from most of the other series, there are two Ultramen as the main characters. They have conflicting philosophies in regards to defending Earth from a mysterious, malevolent and extremely intelligent cosmic entity.

The first half of the series explores the growing tension between them and their eventual clash. The second half has them reconcile their differences so they can defeat their common enemy.

The show is also different from past Ultra Series installments in that the support team, XIG, has more personnel than the defence teams in previous installments.

In this series, Ultraman Gaia is the lead, but Ultraman Agul is prominently focused on as well. They are often at odds with each other at the beginning of the series. Their philosophies are as different as their skin colors. Unlike Gaia, Agul is completely blue. Gamu Takayama, the human host of Ultraman Gaia, believes that Gaia is here to save Earth and humanity. On the other hand, Hiroya Fujimiya, the human host of Ultraman Agul, believes Agul to be Earth's natural defense mechanism. He is at first more interested in protecting just the planet itself, even at the expense of humanity (hence the occasional clashes with Gaia). However, this was discontinued after Gaia and Agul would work together as one to face more powerful monsters.

== Story ==
The story takes place in the year 2000. Chrisis, a supercomputer developed the Alchemy Stars (a global network of young geniuses born during the 1980s), predicts around 1996–1997 that Earth and humanity would be annihilated by something known as the "Radical Destruction Bringer". Technology developed by the Alchemy Stars is used to form an international defence organization known as Geocentric Universal Alliance against the Radical Destruction (G.U.A.R.D.). This is done secretly, so as to avoid causing a worldwide panic. The eXpanded Interceptive Guards (X.I.G.) is the combat wing of G.U.A.R.D, operating in a floating sky fortress known as the Aerial Base.

Gamu Takayama, a 20-year-old scientist and member of the Alchemy Stars, briefly encounters Gaia during some virtual reality experiments he performs with the secret purpose of discovering the will of the Earth, later merging with him in order to fight various monsters that threaten the safety of the Earth. During his battles, he encounters Ultraman Agul, whose human host is Hiroya Fujimiya, a former Alchemy Stars member. Both clash because of their ideals regarding the protection of the Earth but eventually resolve their differences to battle their common enemy.

== Episodes ==
No.	Title	Directed by	Written by	Original release date
1	"Seize the Light!"; Transliteration: "Hikari o Tsukame!" (Japanese: 光をつかめ!)	Hirochika Muraishi	Chiaki J. Konaka	September 5, 1998
2	"A Hero Appears"; Transliteration: "Yūsha Tatsu" (Japanese: 勇者立つ)	Hirochika Muraishi	Chiaki J. Konaka	September 12, 1998
3	"His Name is Gaia"; Transliteration: "Sono Na wa Gaia" (Japanese: その名はガイア)	Toshiyuki Takano	Chiaki J. Konaka	September 19, 1998
4	"Gamu of the Sky"; Transliteration: "Tenkū no Gamu" (Japanese: 天空の我夢)	Toshiyuki Takano	Keiichi Hasegawa	September 26, 1998
5	"Another Giant"; Transliteration: "Mō Hitori no Kyojin" (Japanese: もう一人の巨人)	Masaki Harada	Chiaki J. Konaka	October 3, 1998
6	"The Ridiculing Eye"; Transliteration: "Azawarau Me" (Japanese: あざ笑う眼)	Masaki Harada	Hideyuki Kawakami	October 10, 1998
7	"Cleansing of the Earth"; Transliteration: "Chikyū no Sentaku" (Japanese: 地球の洗濯)	Takashi Kodama	Shin Yoshida	October 17, 1998
8	"The 4 Billion 6 Hundred Million Year-Old Ghost"; Transliteration: "Yonjūrokuokunen no Bōrei" (Japanese: 46億年の亡霊)	Takashi Kodama	Junki Takegami	October 24, 1998
9	"Seagull Takes Off"; Transliteration: "Shīgaru Tobitatsu" (Japanese: シーガル飛びたつ)	Hirochika Muraishi	Ai Ōta	October 31, 1998
10	"Rock Fight"; Transliteration: "Rokku Faito" (Japanese: ロック・ファイト)	Hirochika Muraishi	Chiaki J. Konaka	November 7, 1998
11	"The City Where the Dragon Lies"; Transliteration: "Ryū no Miyako" (Japanese: 龍の都)	Masaki Harada	Kenji Konuta	November 14, 1998
12	"Monster Encircling Net"; Transliteration: "Yajū Hōimō" (Japanese: 野獣包囲網)	Masaki Harada	Hideyuki Kawakami	November 21, 1998
13	"Night of the Marionettes"; Transliteration: "Marionetto no Yoru" (Japanese: マリオネットの夜)	Miki Nemoto	Keiichi Hasegawa	November 28, 1998
14	"Challenge from the Anti-Space"; Transliteration: "Han Uchū kara no Chōsen" (Japanese: 反宇宙からの挑戦)	Miki Nemoto	Junki Takegami	December 5, 1998
15	"When the Rain Stops"; Transliteration: "Ame ga Yandara" (Japanese: 雨がやんだら)	Tsugumi Kitaura	Masakazu Migita	December 12, 1998
16	"Birth of Agul"; Transliteration: "Aguru Tanjō" (Japanese: アグル誕生)	Tsugumi Kitaura	Shin Yoshida	December 19, 1998
17	"Shadow of the Sky, Light of the Earth"; Transliteration: "Ten no Kage Chi no Hikari" (Japanese: 天の影 地の光)	Hirochika Muraishi	Kenji Konuta	December 26, 1998
18	"Agul vs. Gaia"; Transliteration: "Aguru Tai Gaia" (Japanese: アグル対ガイア)	Hirochika Muraishi	Chiaki J. Konaka	January 9, 1999
19	"Lilia's Labyrinth"; Transliteration: "Meikyū no Riria" (Japanese: 迷宮のリリア)	Masaki Harada	Keiichi Hasegawa	January 16, 1999
20	"The Fossil of Ruin"; Transliteration: "Metsubō no Kaseki" (Japanese: 滅亡の化石)	Masaki Harada	Hideyuki Kawakami	January 23, 1999
21	"The Sea of a Mysterious Light"; Transliteration: "Yōkō no Umi" (Japanese: 妖光の海)	Miki Nemoto	Shinsuke Onishi	January 30, 1999
22	"Stone Wings"; Transliteration: "Ishii no Tsubasa" (Japanese: 石の翼)	Miki Nemoto	Ai Ōta	February 6, 1999
23	"Gamu Expelled!"; Transliteration: "Gamu Tsuihō" (Japanese: 我夢追放!)	Tsugumi Kitaura	Shin Yoshida	February 13, 1999
24	"Determination of Agul"; Transliteration: "Aguru no Ketsui" (Japanese: アグルの決意)	Tsugumi Kitaura	Keiichi Hasegawa	February 20, 1999
25	"The Showdown for Tomorrow"; Transliteration: "Asu Naki Taiketsu" (Japanese: 明日なき対決)	Hirochika Muraishi	Masakazu Migita	February 27, 1999
26	"The Final Resolution"; Transliteration: "Ketchaku no Hi" (Japanese: 決着の日)	Hirochika Muraishi	Chiaki J. Konaka	March 6, 1999
27	"A New Battle: Version-up Fight!"; Transliteration: "Aratanaru Tatakai ~Vājon'appu Faito!~" (Japanese: 新たなる戦い～ヴァージョンアップ・ファイト!～)	Takashi Kodama	Kenji Konuta	March 13, 1999
28	"The Advent of the Heatwave"; Transliteration: "Neppa Shūrai" (Japanese: 熱波襲来)	Takashi Kodama	Hideyuki Kawakami	March 20, 1999
29	"Distant City, Uqbar"; Transliteration: "Tōi Machi Ukubāru" (Japanese: 遠い町･ウクバール)	Masaki Harada	Ai Ōta	March 27, 1999
30	"The Demon’s Cocoon"; Transliteration: "Akuma no Mayu" (Japanese: 悪魔のマユ)	Masaki Harada	Takahiko Masuda	April 3, 1999
31	"The Accursed Eye"; Transliteration: "Noroi no Me" (Japanese: 呪いの眼)	Tsugumi Kitaura	Hideyuki Kawakami	April 10, 1999
32	"The Future Seen Before"; Transliteration: "Itsuka Mita Mirai" (Japanese: いつか見た未来)	Tsugumi Kitaura	Junki Takegami	April 17, 1999
33	"Battling the Legend"; Transliteration: "Densetsu to no Tatakai" (Japanese: 伝説との闘い)	Hirochika Muraishi	Keiichi Hasegawa	April 24, 1999
34	"Crash of Souls!"; Transliteration: "Tamashii no Gekitotsu!" (Japanese: 魂の激突!)	Hirochika Muraishi	Hideyuki Kawakami	May 1, 1999
35	"Ransom for a Monster"; Transliteration: "Kaijū no Minoshirokin" (Japanese: 怪獣の身代金)	Ryuichi Ichino	Ai Ōta	May 8, 1999
36	"The Sky of Reunion"; Transliteration: "Saikai no Sora" (Japanese: 再会の空)	Ryuichi Ichino	Shin Yoshida	May 15, 1999
37	"Fourth Symphony of a Nightmare"; Transliteration: "Akumu no Daiyon Gakushō" (Japanese: 悪夢の第四楽章)	Masaki Harada	Keiichi Hasegawa	May 22, 1999
38	"Ground-Breaking Tusks!"; Transliteration: "Daichi Saku Kiba" (Japanese: 大地裂く牙)	Masaki Harada	Kenji Konuta	May 29, 1999
39	"The Lake of Sadness"; Transliteration: "Kanashimi no Numa" (Japanese: 悲しみの沼)	Tsugumi Kitaura	Hideyuki Kawakami	June 5, 1999
40	"I Want to Meet Gaia!"; Transliteration: "Gaia ni Aitai!" (Japanese: ガイアに会いたい!)	Tsugumi Kitaura	Chiaki J. Konaka	June 12, 1999
41	"Resurrection of Agul"; Transliteration: "Aguru Fukkatsu" (Japanese: アグル復活)	Sei Ishikawa & Hirochika Muraishi	Shin Yoshida	June 19, 1999
42	"Gamu vs. Gamu"; Transliteration: "Gamu Tai Gamu" (Japanese: 我夢VS我夢)	Hirochika Muraishi	Chiaki J. Konaka	June 27, 1999
43	"The Silver Eyes of Izak"; Transliteration: "Gin'iro no Me no Izaku" (Japanese: 銀色の眼のイザク)	Miki Nemoto	Ai Ōta	July 3, 1999
44	"The Attack of the Space Monsters"; Transliteration: "Uchū Kaijū Daishingeki" (Japanese: 宇宙怪獣大進撃)	Miki Nemoto	Junki Takegami	July 10, 1999
45	"The Living Planet"; Transliteration: "Inochi Sumu Hoshi" (Japanese: 命すむ星)	Masaki Harada	Kenji Konuta	July 17, 1999
46	"The Attack of the Forest"; Transliteration: "Shūgeki no Mori" (Japanese: 襲撃の森)	Masaki Harada	Keiichi Hasegawa	July 24, 1999
47	"XIG Destroyed!?"; Transliteration: "Shigu Kaimetsu!?" (Japanese: XIG壊滅!?)	Tsugumi Kitaura	Masakazu Migita	July 31, 1999
48	"The Revenge of the Death God"; Transliteration: "Shinigami no Gyakushū" (Japanese: 死神の逆襲)	Tsugumi Kitaura	Hideyuki Kawakami	August 7, 1999
49	"An Angel Descends"; Transliteration: "Tenshi Kōrin" (Japanese: 天使降臨)	Takeshi Yagi & Hirochika Muraishi	Shin Yoshida	August 14, 1999
50	"Cry of the Earth"; Transliteration: "Chikyū no Sakebi" (Japanese: 地球の叫び)	Hirochika Muraishi	Chiaki J. Konaka & Keiichi Hasegawa	August 21, 1999
51	"Earth is the Star of Ultraman"; Transliteration: "Chikyū wa Urutoraman no Hoshi" (Japanese: 地球はウルトラマンの星)	Hirochika Muraishi	Chiaki J. Konaka	August 28, 1999

== Other media ==
=== Films and team ups ===
- Ultraman Gaia: The Battle in Hyperspace (1999), Gaia is one of the main Ultramen to appear in this movie, alongside Tiga and Dyna.
- Ultraman Gaia: Gaia Again (2001), A 45-minute (or a 60-minute extended/alternate edition) Original Video Tokusatsu release (or OVT) set 1 year after the end of the series. Ultraman Gaia and Ultraman Agul return to fight a new enemy, along with help from mysterious undersea creatures.
- Superior Ultraman 8 Brothers (2008), Gaia teams up with Tiga, Dyna and Mebius in this movie, alongside Showa-era Ultra Heroes.
- Ultraman Ginga S The Movie (2015), Ultraman Gaia is one of the Heisei-era Ultra Heroes to fight along with other 9 Heisei-era Ultra Heroes.
- Ultraman Orb: The Origin Saga (2016-2017), Ultraman Gaia and Ultraman Agul return to fight the Bezelbs where it approaches the Earth, along with help from Ultraman Orb, Dyna and Cosmos starting on the eighth episode. The planet Earth in this show is not the one from Ultraman Gaia, as there are no mention of Gaia and Agul's names by its residents.

=== Video games ===
Although not technically an Ultraman game, Ultraman Gaia serves as both the main character and main plot in Banpresto's Super Hero Operations: Diedal's Ambition for the PlayStation.

== Cast ==
- Gamu Takayama (高山 我夢, Takayama Gamu): Takeshi Yoshioka (吉岡 毅志, Yoshioka Takeshi)
- Hiroya Fujimiya (藤宮 博也, Fujimiya Hiroya): Hassei Takano (高野 八誠, Takano Hassei)
- Akio Ishimuro (石室 章雄, Ishimuro Akio): Hiroyuki Watanabe (渡辺 裕之, Watanabe Hiroyuki)
- Tatsumi Chiba (千葉 辰巳, Chiba Tatsumi): Sei Hiraizumi (平泉 成, Hiraizumi Sei)
- Seiichiro Tsutsumi (堤 誠一郎, Tsutsumi Seiichirō): Takashi Ukaji (宇梶 剛士, Ukaji Takashi)
- Atsuko Sasaki (佐々木 敦子, Sasaki Atsuko): Ai Hashimoto (橋本 愛, Hashimoto Ai)
- Georgie Leland (ジョジー・リーランド, Jojī Rīrando): Maria Theresa Gow (マリア・テレサ・ガウ, Maria Teresa Gau)
- Saika Ukai (鵜飼 彩香, Ukai Saika): Saika Tanaka (田中 彩佳, Tanaka Saika)
- Katsumi Kajio (梶尾 克美, Kajio Katsumi): Masami Nakagami (中上 雅巳, Nakagami Masami)
- Yasushi Kitada (北田 靖, Kitada Yasushi): Katsuhiko Hasegawa (長谷川 勝彦, Hasegawa Katsuhiko)
- Satoshi Ohgawara (大河原 聡志, Ōgawara Satoshi): Yusuke Sawaki (沢木 祐介, Sawaki Yūsuke)
- Tatsuhiko Yoneda (米田 達彦, Yoneda Tatsuhiko): Kuronosuke Kagawa (賀川 黒之助, Kagawa Kuronosuke)
- Koichi Hayashi (林 幸市, Hayashi Kōichi): Shogo Shiotani (塩谷 庄吾, Shiotani Shōgo)
- Toru Tsukamoto (塚守 亨, Tsukamoto Tōru): Shin Ishikawa (石川 真, Ishikawa Shin)
- Miho Inagi (稲城 美穂, Inagi Miho): Tomoko Kawashima (川嶋 朋子, Kawashima Tomoko)
- Julie Mishima (三島 樹莉, Mishima Juri): Izumi Matsuda (松田 いずみ, Matsuda Izumi) (Played by Izumiko Matsuda (松田 泉子, Matsuda Izumiko))
- Kei Tadano (多田野 彗, Tadano Kei): Kei Ishibashi (石橋 けい, Ishibashi Kei)
- Satoru Yoshida (吉田 悟, Yoshida Satoru): Masaru Matsuda (松田 優, Matsuda Masaru)
- Mitsugu Shima (志摩 貢, Shima Mitsugu): Kei Kagaya (加賀谷 圭, Kagaya Kei)
- Takanobu Kuwabara (桑原 孝信, Kuwabara Takanobu): Koji Nakamura (中村 浩二, Nakamura Kōji)
- Atsushi Koyama (神山 篤志, Kōyama Atsushi): Shunsuke Gondo (権藤 俊輔, Gondō Shunsuke)
- Renji Matsuo (松尾 蓮二, Matsuo Renji): Tomu Saeba (冴場 都夢, Saeba Tomu)
- Michael Simmons (マイクル・シモンズ, Maikuru Shimonzu): Samuel Pop Aning (サムエル・ポップ・エニング, Samueru Poppu Eningu)
- Ryuichi Senuma (瀬沼 龍一, Senuma Ryūichi): Hiroshi Ishii (石井 浩, Ishii Hiroshi)
- Higuchi (樋口): Ryōsuke Kaizu (海津 亮介, Kaizu Ryōsuke)
- Kōsuke Ranbashi (乱橋 巧介, Ranbashi Kōsuke): Mitsuo Hamada (浜田 光夫, Hamada Mitsuo)
- Catherine Ryan (キャサリン・ライアン, Kyasarin Raian): Debbie Regier (デビー・リギアー, Debī Rigiā)
- Daniel McPhee (ダニエル・マクフィー, Danieru Makufī): John O'Connor (ジョン・オコーナー, Jon O Kōnā)
- Ritsuko Sasaki (佐々木 律子, Sasaki Ritsuko): Azusa Sawamura (沢村 亜津佐, Sawamura Azusa)
- Kyoko Inamori (稲森 京子, Inamori Kyōko): Makiko Kuno (クノ 真季子, Kuno Makiko) (Played by 久野 真紀子)
- Megumi Kuroda (黒田 恵, Kuroda Megumi): Tomoko Ōtakara (大寶 智子, Ōtakara Tomoko)
- Yuki (ユキ): Ai Hasunuma (蓮沼 藍, Hasunuma Ai)
- Shimizu (清水): Kazuya Shimizu (清水 一哉, Shimizu Kazuya) (Played by Kazuhiko Shimizu (清水 一彦, Shimizu Kazuhiko))
- Kenji Tabata (田端 健二, Tabata Kenji): Hiroshi Tsuburaya (円谷 浩, Tsuburaya Hiroshi)
- Reiko Yoshii (吉井 玲子, Yoshii Reiko): Yukari Ishida (石田 裕加里, Ishida Yukari)
- Michifumi Inoue (井上 倫文, Inoue Michifumi): Eisuke Tsunoda (角田 英介, Tsunoda Eisuke)
- Sato (サトウ, Satō): Togo Okumoto (奥本 東五, Okumoto Tōgo)
- Makoto (マコト): Hiroaki Nishijima (西嶋 大明, Nishijima Hiroaki)
- Nakaji (ナカジ): Masashi Kagami (加々美 正史, Kagami Masashi)
- Shigemi Takayama (高山 重美, Takayama Shigemi): Aki Mizusawa (水沢 アキ, Mizusawa Aki)
- Yuiichi Takayama (高山 唯一, Takayama Yuiichi): Sen Yamamoto (山本 亘, Yamamoto Sen)

=== Voice cast ===
- Narrator: Hiroshi Isobe (磯部 弘, Isobe Hiroshi)

== Music ==
Opening theme

- "Ultraman Gaia!" by Masayuki Tanaka (田中 昌之, Tanaka Masayuki) & Kazuya Daimon (大門 一也, Daimon Kazuya)

Ending themes

- "Lovin' You Lovin' Me" by B.B. WAVES
- "Beat on Dream on" by Tomohiko Kikuta (菊田 知彦, Kikuta Tomohiko)

Insertion songs

- "LOVE IS ALIVE" by Hitomi Sudo
- "Gaia No Chikara" by Masayuki Tanaka & Kazuya Daimon
- "Blue Wolf" by Tomohiko Kikuta

== Home media ==
In 2016, the series was released on Crunchyroll and later released on the streaming service Toku in 2018.

In July 2020, Shout! Factory announced to have struck a multi-year deal with Alliance Entertainment and Mill Creek, with the blessings of Tsuburaya and Indigo, that granted them the exclusive SVOD and AVOD digital rights to the Ultra series and films (1,100 TV episodes and 20 films) acquired by Mill Creek the previous year. Ultraman Gaia, amongst other titles, will stream in the United States and Canada through Shout! Factory TV and Tokushoutsu.
