= List of Ultraman Trigger: New Generation Tiga characters =

This is the character list of 2021 Ultra Series Ultraman Trigger: New Generation Tiga, as well as the 2022 follow-up sequel, Ultraman Decker. Both shows inherited the elements from Ultraman Tiga and Ultraman Dyna respectively as part of celebrating the 25th anniversary of TDG multimedia program. In addition, the list also contains characters from related media such as Ultra Galaxy Fight: The Destined Crossroad, Ultraman Regulos, and Ultraman Regulos: First Mission.

== Protagonists ==
=== Kengo Manaka ===
Kengo Manaka (マナカ ケンゴ, Manaka Kengo) is the 21-year-old protagonist of Ultraman Trigger: New Generation Tiga, known for being sociable and kind while bearing a sense of justice. Kengo is actually Ultraman Trigger's inner light incarnated into a human, who Reina Manaka discovered during her expedition into the petrified Ultra's ruins as an infant. He spent the remainder of his life raised in the Martian colony, taking on the job as a botanist to study the genetically-modified flower R'lyeh (ルルイエ, Ruruie), hoping to make it bloom one day.

After receiving a nightmare regarding the dark giant and witnessing Golba's attack on the Martian settlement, Kengo merged with the eponymous Ultraman Trigger and moved to Earth, becoming the newest member of GUTS-Select. Kengo would later be banished into the past when Carmeara used her curse to revert Trigger into Trigger Dark. Through Yuzare's help, he created a time loop by convincing the dark Ultra's past iteration into defecting from his fellow members and eventually returning to the present day with gaining access to Glitter Trigger Eternity. In addition to discovering his status as the reincarnation of Trigger's inner light, Kengo swore to protect Yuna after his failure to do so with Yuzare in the past. After defeating Carmeara/Megalothor, Kengo's wish for R'lyeh to bloom came true, but he is forced to be separated from his friends in order to stabilize the Eternity Core by fusing with it. Two years later in Ultraman Trigger: Episode Z, Kengo is freed from the Core when his life started to diminish, but is later dragged into another battle against Rylar, a cult led by Zabil who stole Trigger's powers as part of becoming an Ultraman himself. After the battle, Kengo joins in the celebration with his fellow GUTS-Select members while resuming his life as both human and Ultraman once more.

Kengo eventually left the Earth and returned a decade later in Ultraman Decker, bringing along the Ultra Dual Sword when it guides him towards the titular Ultra and the new generation of GUTS-Select members. Joining forces with his successor Kanata/Decker, the two made their move to fight against the resurrected Megalothor on Earth and finally departing with Carmeara after giving the sword to Kanata.

Kengo Manaka is portrayed by Raiga Terasaka (寺坂 頼我, Terasaka Raiga).

=== Ultraman Ribut ===
First appearing in Ultra Galaxy Fight: New Generation Heroes, Ultraman Ribut (ウルトラマンリブット, Urutoraman Ributto) is a member of the Galaxy Rescue Force and the protagonist of Galaxy Rescue Force Voice Drama, a mini series that chronicles his early days of participation into the elite team after events of The Absolute Conspiracy. Aside from his interactions with fellow team members, Ribut then fights against their rogue member "Daada" and eventually departed to Earth (specifically in Malaysia) to both training himself and to fight against the increasing monster attacks.

In Ultra Galaxy Fight: The Destined Crossroad, Ribut and the rest of the Ultra League reported to the Inter Galactic Defense Force after failing to stop Yullian's kidnapping. Under the Father of Ultra, he is reinstated into the latter group and supported the Ultra Force on Planet Babel, wherein Nexus' intervention convinces the young Ultra to prevent their war with the Absolutians. After his brief death and resurrection, Ribut's attempt at shielding his companions from the crossfire between Ultraman King and Tartarus on Planet Blizzard (惑星ブリザード, Wakusei Burizādo) resulted with him and the two Absolutians dragged into a wormhole.

Alongside Tartarus and Diavolo, Ribut found himself in the middle of Ultraman Trigger as he once again meddled with the Absolutians' affair, while also training Kengo on how to fully control the Glitter Trigger Eternity. Upon creating a human form of his own, which he christens as Ribut (リブット, Ributto), the Ultra borrowed Yuna's GUTS Sparklence and Gomora Key into his personal transformation devices to return to his original form. His Hyper Key is left to Yuna's possession after finishing his mission on Earth, which GUTS-Select would utilize to empower the Nursedessei in delivering a mercy kill to a brainwashed Darrgon.

In Ultraman Regulos: First Mission, Ribut returns from the universe of Trigger and participates in the fight against Alien Reiblood and his minions alongside Regulos, Powered, Great, and the Ultra Force.

Wataru Komada (駒田 航, Komada Wataru) reprises his voice role as Ultraman Ribut in Japanese, and Josh Keller in the English dub of The Destined Crossroad. His human form is portrayed by Shimba Tsuchiya (土屋 神葉, Tsuchiya Shinba).

=== Marluru ===
Alien Metron "Marluru" (メトロン星人 マルゥル, Metoron Seijin Marwuru) is a young alien who serves as the team's operator and monster informant. Aside from his appearance in Ultraman Trigger, Marluru is also one of the three main characters in Secret Origins of the Nursedessei: The Struggle of Special Section 3.

Prior to the foundation of GUTS-Select, Marluru accepted the offer to join TPU from then-staff officer Tatsumi through their common ground, and since then swore his life debt on the captain himself. Under Tatsumi's suggestion, he was initially assigned to Special Section 3 for the development of vehicles that would be used by GUTS-Select in the future. Working alongside Hotta and Terumi, Marluru's backdoor deal with Alien Wild "Zagar" becomes the key to the creation of Nursedessei, developing it alongside Akito before they would eventually be assigned to GUTS-Select. In Ultraman Chronicle D, Marluru rented an apartment at some point after Evil Trigger's destruction and is forced to share it with a freeloading Deban to his dismay. By the time GUTS-Select was disbanded, Marluru remains on Earth up to the events of Ultraman Decker, wherein he rejoins Special Section 3 in supporting the new generation of GUTS-Select members through maintenance and creation of their vehicles.

Marluru is voiced by M・A・O. The Alien Metron race first appeared in episode 8 of Ultraseven.

=== Deban ===
Little Mascot Monster Deban (マスコット小怪獣 デバン, Masukotto Shō Kaijū Deban) is the navigator of Deban Channel (デバンチャンネル, Deban Chan'neru), a trio of omnibus episodes within Ultraman Trigger: New Generation Tiga. In Ultraman Chronicle D, Deban freeloads into Marluru's apartment under Tatsumi's suggestion after failing to join the GUTS-Select membership, wherein he provides exposition of past Ultras while inviting past characters as guests to Marluru's house. By the end of Chronicle D, Deban took the advice of relying on his own strength to heart, deciding to forfeit his membership and leaving Marluru's house to continue his travel.

He is voiced by Risae Matsuda (松田 利冴, Matsuda Risae) and first appeared in episode 21 of Ultraman Tiga.

=== Ultraman Regulos ===
Ultraman Regulos (ウルトラマンレグロス, Urutoraman Regurosu) is an Ultra who debuted in Ultra Galaxy Fight: The Destined Crossroad, previously appearing in The Absolute Conspiracy as a silhouetted figure who was imprisoned alongside Yullian by the Absolutians. He is also set to appear as the protagonist of his own eponymous spin-off media.

Regulos was originally an amnesiac Ultra who found himself on Planet D60 after a near-death experience. He was recruited by Master Alude to join the Cosmo Beast Style and trains with his fellow students, as well as befriending the Leo Brothers from the neighboring planet. When the Alien Magma launched their attack on both planets, Regulos fail to save his fellow students from their deaths and was imprisoned by The Kingdom as part of their attempt in studying the Ultra Warriors. Due to the situation of his kidnapping, Regulos became a Parallel Isotope despite being around the same age as the Leo Brothers during the latter's active period on Earth. While recovering his strength through Yullian's help, Regulos break free from his restrains during the Ultras' intrusion into the Absolute Palace, eventually joining forces with the Leo Brothers once again to avenge Alude's death by defeating Diavolo. Following Tartarus, Diavolo and Ribut's disappearances, Regulos resumed his new life in the Galaxy Rescue Force while keeping the title of the grand master to himself in honor of Alude.

During his first arrival to Planet D60, Regulos lacked the Cosmo Beast tattoos on his arms and a pair of wrist cuffs, this "form" being designated as Early Style (アーリースタイル, Ārī Sutairu). As a Cosmo Beast Style practitioner, the tattoos on each of his arms that grant him the powers of Lightning White Tiger Fist (電撃白虎拳, Dengeki Byakko-ken) and Flaming Red Dragon Fist (火炎赤龍拳, Kaen Sekiryū-ken). His finishing move is the Red Dragon & White Tiger Strike (赤龍白虎拳, Sekiryū Byakko-ken). Together with the Leo Brothers, Regulos can channel the powers of the fallen Cosmo Beast Style students and focusing their energies into the Cosmo Beast Monarch Strike (幻獣覇王拳, Genjū Haō-ken).

Ultraman Regulos is voiced by Shugo Nakamura (仲村 宗悟, Nakamura Shūgo) in Japanese, and by Vinay Murthy in the English dub.

=== Kanata Asumi ===
Kanata Asumi (アスミ カナタ, Asumi Kanata) is the 20-year-old protagonist of Ultraman Decker, a kind young man who originally worked at his family's rice cracker store, Asumiya (明日見屋). When the Spheres begin their attack on Earth, Kanata is saved from certain death when he receives the Ultra D Flasher (ウルトラDフラッシャー, Urutora Dī Furasshā) from who he later learns to be his descendant Decker Asumi. Kanata becomes Ultraman Decker to fight the invaders while at the same time joining the newly reformed GUTS-Select as their newest member. As the fight progresses, Kanata learns of Decker's power coming from his future descendant of similar namesake but when given the option to retire as an Ultra, he persists and unlocks Dynamic Type, a form that is unique to Kanata himself. Near the finale of the series, Kanata gets infected by the Spheres' essence that slowly hampers his fighting skills, but manages to pull through long enough to deliver the final blow against Mother Spheresaurus and eradicating the Spheres' threats, forcing him to part ways with Ultraman Decker. In Ultraman Decker Finale: Journey to Beyond, Kanata becomes Ultraman Decker again and joins TPU's second space exploration team following Professor Gibellus' death.

Kanata Asumi transforms into Ultraman Decker with the Ultra D Flasher and a set of Ultra Dimension Cards (ウルトラディメンションカード, Urutora Dimenshon Kādo) pertaining to Decker's forms. In addition, scanning the Mons Dimension Cards (モンスディメンションカード, Monsu Dimenshon Kādo) allows him to summon Dimension Card Monsters as Decker's limited-time supporters. At the end of his encounter with Kengo, Kanata inherited the Ultra Dual Sword and Trigger's set of cards for Decker's use in subsequent battles.

Kanata Asumi is portrayed by Hiroki Matsumoto (松本 大輝, Matsumoto Hiroki).

== GUTS-Select ==
GUTS-Select (ガッツセレクト, Gattsu Serekuto) is a defense team under TPU Japan branch that fights against monster attacks, with Mitsukuni establishing them using the knowledge of GUTS in mind. In the middle of its 7 years devoid of monster attacks, GUTS-Select was briefly disbanded and most of its members has since moved to Mars while Marluru remains on Earth. In addition, their combat mecha were modified into autopiloted drones when TPU begins to cut costs in Earth defenses in favor of space exploration. In Ultraman Decker, when the Spheres invade and confine Earth, GUTS-Select is reformed a year later to combat them through its list of new members while retaining most of its predecessor's assets.

=== Ultraman Trigger era ===
==== Yuna Shizuma ====
Yuna Shizuma (シズマ ユナ, Shizuma Yuna) is a 17, later 18-year-old member who is the daughter of Mitsukuni, Sizuma Foundation's chairman. In addition to being talented, she received privilege education since her childhood. Yuna still attends high school and is in charge of guiding the team's new rookie, Kengo, in missions. As a descendant of Yuzare, Yuna is in constant danger of being targeted by the Giants of Darkness in order for them to access the Eternity Core while she tries to deal with the burden of her ancestor. In the middle of the series, Yuna learns of Kengo's double life as Trigger after Akito mistook Trigger Dark for his host. At some point during Kyrieloid's reign of terror, Yuna reaches her full potential as Yuzare's successor as the Giants of Darkness try to aim for her life again. She was captured by Carmeara after Darrgon's death and forced to be the key to the Eternity Core wherein the dark Ultra mutated herself into Megalothor. In the final battle, Yuna is able to use Yuzare's powers to redirect the Eternity Core's energy into Nursedessei, granting Trigger the necessary power boost to destroy Megalothor.

At the time of Ultraman Decker taking place, Yuna has become her father's secretary in Sizuma Foundation and is trapped on Earth when the Spheres isolated it from the rest of the universe, separating her from the rest of her former GUTS-Select colleague when they were on Mars. When Kengo briefly returned to Earth, Yuna approaches him to reveal of Gijeran's presence and join forces with the new GUTS-Select to fight against Sphere-Megalothor.

Yuna Shizuma is portrayed by Runa Toyoda (豊田 ルナ, Toyoda Runa). As a child, Yuna is portrayed by Rion Hikichi (引地 涼音, Hikichi Rion).

==== Akito Hijiri ====
Akito Hijiri (ヒジリ アキト, Hijiri Akito) is the 18-year-old genius engineer who is in charge of development. He designed most of GUTS-Select's weapons and mechas, and spent most of his time in Nursedessei's lab for researching stone slabs and artifacts from the Ultra Ancient Civilization.

Six years prior to the series, the Hijiri family were scientists of Sizuma Foundation who assisted in the repair of GUTS Wing 1 to fight against Deathdrago. Akito lost his parents to the very same monster and had since adopted under Mitsukuni's care. As Akito grows to accept Mitsukuni as his parental substitute, he also met Yuna and harboring a one-sided crush on her, to the point of attending the same high school in the present day. He sees Kengo as a rival and tends to bickering with him, being envious of the latter's inheritance over Trigger's power, but the slowly grew close as the series progresses. In Ultraman Decker, Akito is among the survivors of Sphere's attack on Mars and joins the former GUTS-Select members to defend other survivors from Sphere's reign of terror.

Akito Hijiri is portrayed by Shunya Kaneko (金子 隼也, Kaneko Shun'ya). As a child, Akito is portrayed by Rito Tokuyama (徳山 凜響, Tokuyama Rito).

==== Tesshin Sakuma ====
Tesshin Sakuma (サクマ テッシン, Sakuma Tesshin) is the 40-year-old pilot of Nursedessei, the oldest among his team members. He is a hot-blooded person who is friendly to his teammates, regardless of their ranks. He acts as a big brother figure to Kengo, but Akito and Himari are intolerable to his presence. Although he was absent in Ultraman Decker, Tesshin is among the survivors of Sphere's attack on Mars and joins the former GUTS-Select members to defend other survivors from Sphere's reign of terror.

Tesshin Sakuma is portrayed by Tadashi Mizuno (水野 直, Mizuno Tadashi), who previously portrayed Haruo Kume in Ultraman Geed.

==== Himari Nanase ====
Himari Nanase (ナナセ ヒマリ, Nanase Himari) is a 26-year-old operation specialist whose initial stern and dutiful turns into a hot-blooded pilot when handling the GUTS Falcons in aerial combat. Although she was absent in Ultraman Decker, Himari is among the survivors of Sphere's attack on Mars and joins the former GUTS-Select members to defend other survivors from Sphere's reign of terror.

Himari Nanase is portrayed by Meiku Harukawa (春川 芽生, Harukawa Meiku), who previously portrayed Hiyori in Ultraman Ginga S.

==== Seiya Tatsumi ====
Seiya Tatsumi (タツミ セイヤ, Tatsumi Seiya) is the 38-year-old captain of GUTS-Select, who provides commands from the Nursedessei's cockpit. He balances with being strict and kind to his teammates at the same time. Alongside Akito, Tatsumi is well aware of Yuna's ancestry and Mitsukuni's origin, but keeps it to himself until he reveals it to GUTS-Select on the day of Yuna's 18th birthday. He even figures out Kengo's identity as Ultraman Trigger, but keeps it for himself before Kengo reveal it to GUTS-Select. In Ultraman Decker, Tatsumi is among the survivors of Sphere's attack on Mars and leads the former GUTS-Select members to defend other survivors from Sphere's reign of terror.

Seiya Tatsumi is portrayed by Katsuya Takagi (高木 勝也, Takagi Katsuya).

=== Ultraman Decker era ===
==== Ichika Kirino ====
Ichika Kirino (キリノ イチカ, Kirino Ichika) is a hot-blooded and athletic 20-year-old member who can perform quick maneuvers despite her short stature. She joins the GUTS-Select in hopes of restoring peace to Earth and saving the friends she had lost from the Spheres' attack. In Ultraman Decker Finale: Journey to Beyond, following Professor Gibellus' death, Ichika joins TPU's second space exploration team.

Ichika Kirino is portrayed by Yuka Murayama (村山 優香, Murayama Yūka).

==== Soma Ryumon ====
Soma Ryumon (リュウモン ソウマ, Ryūmon Sōma) is the cool-headed 20-year-old GUTS Falcon pilot who gains the moniker "observant genius" from his captain due to his observant eye. His membership into GUTS-Select was inspired from his experience of being rescued by a TPU soldier in his childhood, hence training himself to join the team against his father's wishes. In Ultraman Decker Finale: Journey to Beyond, following Professor Gibellus' death, Ryumon replaces Murahoshi as GUTS-Select's new captain.

Soma Ryumon is portrayed by Nobunaga Daichi (大地 伸永, Daichi Nobunaga). As a child, Ryumon is portrayed by Yūki Takasugi (高杉 侑希, Takasugi Yūki).

==== Sawa Kaizaki ====
Sawa Kaizaki (カイザキ サワ, Kaizaki Sawa) is the 29-year-old vice captain of the reformed GUTS-Select and the pilot/operator of Nursedessei. In addition to being a stern sub-captain to the rest of the team, she is also a leading authority on monsters, due to her doctorate in biology. In Ultraman Decker Finale: Journey to Beyond, following Professor Gibellus' death, Kaizaki becomes the director of the new Monster Prediction and Response Center.

Sawa Kaizaki is portrayed by Sae Miyazawa (宮澤 佐江, Miyazawa Sae), who previously portrayed Sawa Takayama in Ultraman Saga.

==== Taiji Murahoshi ====
Taiji Murahoshi (ムラホシ タイジ, Murahoshi Taiji) is the 38-year-old captain of the reformed GUTS-Select. He is a junior to Seiya Tatsumi and is a former TPU ace pilot, initially taking the job of a principal in TPU's training school in the middle of the declining monster attacks before he rejoined the front lines once the Sphere commences their invasion on Earth. In Ultraman Decker Finale: Journey to Beyond, following Professor Gibellus' death, Murahoshi returns to the training school.

Taiji Murahoshi is portrayed by Masaya Kikawada (黄川田 雅哉, Kikawada Masaya), who previously portrayed Alien Gold "tE-rU" in Ultraman X.

==== HANE2 ====
Cybernetic Companion HANE2 (電脳友機 HANE2, Den'nō Yūki Eichi Ē Enu Ī Tsū) is an artificial intelligence developed by TPU, who would later on receive the nickname Hanejiro (ハネジロー, Hanejirō) from Kanata. It was originally intended to pilot a spacecraft for outer space development, but due to the threats of Spheres on Earth, HANE2 is assigned to GUTS-SELECT, piloting the GUTS Hawk and usually providing support for the team's aerial combat. Due the circumstances for Decker's fight with Sphere Gomora, Kanata revealed his identity as the Ultra's host to HANE2, the latter had since agreed to keep his teammate's identity a secret. HANE2 is later assigned to pilot Terraphaser to replace its fried AI, despite piloting the robot is against its original expertise. In Ultraman Decker Finale: Journey to Beyond, HANE3, nickname Hanesaburo (ハネサブロー, Hanesaburō), is developed.

HANE2 is voiced by Hiroshi Tsuchida (土田 大, Tsuchida Hiroshi). It is a tribute to Hanejiro from Ultraman Dyna.

=== Arsenal and mecha ===
Common

- Anti-Monster Battleship Nursedessei (対怪獣用戦闘艇 ナースデッセイ号, Tai Kaijū-yō Sentō-tei Nāsudessei-gō): GUTS-Select's mobile mothership, equipped with the Nurse Cannon (ナースキャノン, Nāsu Kyanon). Normally in the default Hangar Mode (ハンガーモード, Hangā Mōdo), it can transform into the dragon-like Battle Mode (バトルモード, Batoru Mōdo). Nursedessei is designed by Akito after obtaining the data of Nurse from Alien Wild Zagar, but due to the high consumption of energy needed in activating the Battle Mode, the latter form was shelved until the appearance of Absolutians on Earth has GUTS-Select stealing Diavolo's Absolute Particles to empower their mothership. In Ultraman Decker, Nursedessei was originally modified into an autopiloted battleship but Spheresaurus' attack that causes signal interference forced it to revert to manual piloting at some point during GUTS-Select's reformation. In Ultraman Decker Finale: Journey to Beyond, the Nursedessei joins TPU's second space exploration team as an escort ship and the Nursedessei 2 (ナースデッセイ2号, Nāsudessei Ni-gō) is deployed instead.
- Multipurpose Unmanned Convertible Droader GUTS Falcon (多目的無人可変ドローダー GUTSファルコン, Tamokuteki Mujin Kahen Dorōdā Gattsu Farukon): An unmanned aircraft which can be controlled through VR from the Nursedessei cockpit. Originally in the default Flight Mode (フライトモード, Furaito Mōdo), it can transform into the Hyper Mode (ハイパーモード, Haipā Mōdo) during combat. The GUTS Falcon was created using Mitsukuni's modified GUTS Wing 1 as a basis. It can also be manually piloted through a hidden cockpit in case if the VR system is rendered unusable. In Ultraman Decker, the GUTS Falcon is repurposed for manual piloting as a result of Sphere's activity disabling the VR flight system and the autopiloting system. The jet is mainly piloted by Kanata and gains the ability to combine with GUTS Hawk to form GUTS Gryphon.

Ultraman Trigger era

- GUTS Sparklence (GUTSスパークレンス, Gattsu Supākurensu): The GUTS-Select's standard firearm weapon, which can be used in conjunction with the Hyper Keys as bullets. It was created by Akito Hijiri through reverse engineering of the Ancient Sparklence. Although normally in Hyper Gun Mode (ハイパーガンモード, Haipā Gan Mōdo), in Kengo's case, he can set it to Sparklence Mode (スパークレンスモード, Supākurensu Mōdo) to transform into Ultraman Trigger. Transformable variants of the GUTS Sparklence (like Kengo's model) would later be used by Haruki and Ribut during their presence in Kengo's Earth. The weapon is based on Daigo Madoka's Sparklence and the GUTS Hyper Gun in Ultraman Tiga.
  - Ancient Sparklence (エンシェントスパークレンス, Enshento Supākurensu): A relic from the Ultra Ancient era which serves as the basis of GUTS Sparklence. Initially under the Terran Protection Team's ownership, its original purpose is to gather the lights from the stars and was initially in Yuzare's possession, who gave it to a time-displaced Kengo in an attempt to reach Trigger Dark. In Episode Z, Zabil uses the device in conjunction with Trigger's Hyper Keys stolen from Kengo to transform into Evil Trigger.
- GUTS Hyper Keys (GUTSハイパーキー, Gattsu Haipā Kī): Magazines created by Akito as ammunition for GUTS Sparklence. Kengo has the Keys which allows him to transform into Trigger or providing the Ultra with his Type Changes. They are based on the energy cartridges of GUTS Hyper Gun in Ultraman Tiga.
  - Monster Keys (怪獣キー, Kaijū Kī): Counterparts of the GUTS Hyper Keys which has the powers of a monster, allowing users to harness a portion of their powers as energy bullets.
- GUTS Hyper Launcher (GUTSハイパーランチャー, Gattsu Haipā Ranchā): A U-shaped recoilless cannon that can harness the power of three Kaiju Keys into a single large beam. It is mainly used by highly trained members due to its weight.
- GUTS Triple Hyper (GUTSトリプルハイパー, Gattsu Toripuru Haipā): A rifle that Akito created with the ability to harness three different Kaiju Keys and can be switched from either single or continuous firing.

Ultraman Decker era

- GUTS Hawk (GUTSホーク, Gattsu Hōku): A red-colored aircraft which HANE2 piloted to support the pilots of GUTS Falcon. It was initially built as a space exploration-use vehicle, but is reassigned to GUTS-Select at the height of Spheres' invasion. Originally in the default Flight Mode, it can transform into the Dragon Mode (飛竜モード, Hiryū Mōdo) that exudes a pair of boosters and tail.
  - GUTS Gryphon (GUTSグリフォン, Gattsu Gurifon): The combined form of GUTS Falcon after docking with GUTS Hawk.
- Select Hyper Gun (セレクトハイパーガン, Serekuto Haipā Gan): The GUTS-Select's standard firearm weapon. Depending on the combat situation, it can be customized into either Select Hyper Gun Carbine (セレクトハイパーガンカービン, Serekuto Haipā Gan Kābin) or Sniper Custom Model (スナイパーカスタムモデル, Sunaipā Kasutamu Moderu) through attachment parts.
- Cybernetic Golem Terraphaser (電脳魔人 テラフェイザー, Den'nō Majin Terafeizā): Codenamed DG001, Terraphaser is a TR Particle-powered autonomous giant robot created by Agams while posing as Asakage. Intended by the Bazdor native as his own means of assisting the Spheres and destroying Decker, he masks the project as part of strengthening TPU's assets. HANE2 briefly acted as its initial pilot, doing so to replace the damaged AI but Agams hijacked the robot once he finally show his true colors to menace the GUTS-Select members on multiple occasions. It was then reclaimed by GUTS-Select after Agams sacrificed himself to shield Decker and returns to service at the height of Mother Spheresaurus' invasion. Its weapons are the retractable Claw Arm (クローアーム, Kurō Āmu) on its right, the TR Beam Cannon (TRビーム砲, Tī Āru Bīmu-hō) on the left arm, and a pair of shoulder armors which combine into the TR Mega Buster (TRメガバスター, Tī Āru Mega Basutā). When hijacked by Agams, the Phase Riser allows Terraphaser to channel the power of Mons Dimension Cards onto its own. Secretly from its early creation, Agams had installed a Sphere into the robot as a form of energy source. The robot is based on Deathfacer from Ultraman Tiga and Ultraman Dyna: Warriors of the Star of Light.

== TPU ==
The Terrestrial Peaceable Union (地球平和同盟, Chikyū Heiwa Dōmei; TPU) is an organization formed by the joint collaboration of Sizuma Foundation and worldwide nations six years prior to the series in anticipation of monsters and dark forces that threatens the safety of Planet Earth.

=== Mitsukuni Shizuma ===
Mitsukuni Shizuma (シズマ ミツクニ, Shizuma Mitsukuni) is the 60-year-old president of Sizuma Foundation (シズマ財団, Shizuma Zaidan), TPU's founder and Yuna's father in Ultraman Trigger. Mitsukuni's true identity is a TPC investigation officer from the Neo Frontier universe who accidentally entered the world of Trigger 30 years prior through the series when his GUTS Wing entered a space-time vortex. At some point later on, he married Yurika and they established Sizuma Foundation. Six years prior to the series, Mitsukuni discovered the incoming threats from Giants of Darkness and monster attacks through the Ultra Ancient ruins, but his words fell on deaf's ears until the appearance of Deathdrago validated his claims. Under his leadership, the Sizuma Foundation is in charge of interstellar exploration and studies, as well as providing necessary funds to TPU and its proxy, GUTS-Select. At the time of Deathdrago's attack, Mitsukuni's sole supporters were the Hijiri family scientists, taking the young Akito under his care to honor his parents' sacrifices.

During Golba's attack on the Martian colony, Mitsukuni and Reina bear witness to Kengo's fight against the monster and its master, Carmeara, when the ancient prophecy was fulfilled in the present day. In addition to his memory of Ultraman Tiga, Mitsukuni decided to induct Kengo into the newly formed GUTS-Select. During Kyrieloid's fight with Ultraman Trigger, a piece of Tiga's light was revealed to have been in Mitsukuni all along, which allows Yuna/Yuzare to summon Ultraman Tiga to assist Trigger in their fight against the extradimensional being. (Note: Depending on the sources, Cinema Today refers to this Tiga as being summoned, while the 176th volume of Uchusen magazine refers to him as a manifestation of Mitsukuni's inner light.)

Mitsukuni Shizuma is portrayed by Shin Takuma (宅麻 伸, Takuma Shin).

=== Special Section 3 ===
Department of Technological Development: Special Section 3 (技術部・特務3課, Gijutsu-bu Tokumu San-ka) is a department in TPU that is managed by Hotta. Marluru used to join the team under Tatsumi's suggestion before he was recruited into GUTS-Select. During the events of Decker, Marluru returns to Special Section 3 under the demands of TPU to assist Hotta with behind the scene projects for the new GUTS-Select.

- Masamichi Hotta (ホッタ マサミチ, Hotta Masamichi): Marluru's boss, who is prone to stomach ache during stresses. Hotta then appears in episode 24 of Trigger to assist GUTS-Select in their immediate repair of Nursedessei in the light of Megalothor's rampage. He returns in Decker, now aged 60 years old and reunites with Marluru to assist the new members of GUTS-Select with frequent maintenances. He is portrayed by Munetoshi Takubo (田久保 宗稔, Takubo Munetoshi).
- Terumi Yazaki (ヤザキ テルミ, Yazaki Terumi): The dutiful accountant who belongs to TPU's accounting department and easily befriends with Marluru despite their different personalities. She marries Alien Wild Zagar. She is portrayed by Shio Yamazaki (山﨑 紫生, Yamazaki Shio).

=== Other members ===
Secret Origins of the Nursedessei

- Saber Tyrant Alien Magma (サーベル暴君 マグマ星人, Sāberu Bōkun Maguma Seijin; 3, 13, 20, 21): An alien who works at TPU's public relations department: special section 3. In episode 13, he relays the rumor of Alien Wild Zagar's arrival on Earth to Marluru, which sets the motion of Nursedessei's creation. He is voiced by Kōichi Toshima (外島 孝一, Toshima Kōichi) and first appeared in episode 1 of Ultraman Leo.
- Strategy Alien Alien Pedan (策略宇宙人 ペダン星人, Sakuryaku Uchūjin Pedan Seijin; 7, 10): An alien who works part-time at TPU's cafeteria. He came to Earth to study its literature. He is voiced by You Murakami (村上 ヨウ, Murakami Yō) and first appeared in episode 15 of Ultraseven.
- Extradimensional Being Ghighi (異次元人 ギギ, Ijigen-jin Gigi; 13): An alien who works at TPU's investigation department: sciences team. She is voiced by You Murakami and first appeared in episode 17 of Ultraman Cosmos.
- Space Phantom Cicadaman (宇宙怪人 セミ人間, Uchū Kaijin Semi Ningen; 13): An alien who works at TPU's maintenance department. During an alien meeting held by Marluru, Cicadaman attempts to provide his idea, only for the language barrier for his kind's language rendering it impossible for the rest of the aliens to understand. First appeared in episode 16 of Ultra Q.
- Alien Pitt "Pitoko" (ピット星人 ピト子, Pitto Seijin Pitoko; 18, 21): An alien who works at TPU's accounting department and is in charge of accounting for its department of technological development: special section 2. During a meeting discussion held by Marluru, Pitoko provided the data of Eleking which was saved into a Monster Key. She is voiced by Miki Ōtani (大谷 美紀, Ōtani Miki) and first appeared in episode 3 of Ultraseven.
- Transforming Phantom Alien Zetton (変身怪人 ゼットン星人, Henshin Kaijin Zetton Seijin; 21): An alien who works at TPU's security department. During the second alien meeting held by Marluru, he gave TPU the data of Zetton which was saved into a Monster Key. He is voiced by Tetsuo Kishi (岸 哲生, Kishi Tetsuo) and first appeared in episode 39 of Ultraman.

Ultraman Decker

- Transforming Phantom Alien Pitt (変身怪人 ピット星人, Henshin Kaijin Pitto Seijin; 5): An alien who assumes the human identity of Yuko (ユウコ, Yūko), she became stranded on Earth with her Eleking pet Elly when her spaceship broke and the Earth being covered by the Sphere Barrier. Yuko crosses paths with Ichika when Elly started its attack, asking GUTS-Select's help in feeding her monster. Once the situation has been resolved, Yuko is allowed to keep the now larva Eleking, with Sawa giving her guidance over the monster's feeding habit. In GUTS-Select Exchange Report: Special Section 3 Returns, she was scouted by Murahoshi into working at TPU's cafeteria and through there, she reunited with Ichika while being able to assume her true form. After delivering lunch to Special Section 3, she commissioned Hotta to build an autonomous machine to feed Elly periodically. She is portrayed by Shuri Nakamura (中村 守里, Nakamura Shuri) and first appeared in episode 3 of Ultraseven.
- Alien Meton "Nigel" (メトロン星人 ナイゲル, Metoron Seijin Naigeru; 17, Movie): A non-binary alien who serves as the director of TPU's internal affairs and has an affinity for classical music despite their by-the-book attitude. (Note: Nigel's gender was never highlighted in the series, but is considered as non-binary according to Hiroki Matsumoto, Kanata's actor.) Nigel suspends Murahoshi in the light of Agams' betrayal, due to his close relation to "Asakage", as well as for going AWOL during Metsu-Orochi's rampage. After Ryumon clears Murahoshi of his accusations, Nigel removes the captain's suspension and takes their leave, finally acknowledging GUTS-Select's competency in against monster attacks. They are voiced by Yūko Kaida (甲斐田 裕子, Kaida Yūko).

=== TPU mechas ===
- GUTS Wing (ガッツウイング, Gattsu Uingu): TPC and GUTS' main combat aircraft from Ultraman Tiga. It was originally young Mitsukuni's jet during his time as a TPC investigation officer and ended up trapped in the world of Trigger alongside its pilot. After being fixed by Akito's parents, Mitsukuni piloted it to fight against the threat of Deathdrago and was later on becoming the basis of TPU and GUTS-Select's technology. To conceal the aircraft's nature from the other universe, it was covered up as a government technology by TPU and Sizuma Foundation. The GUTS Wing was later modified into a VR-guided aircraft that eventually becomes the forerunner of the GUTS Falcon.

== Other major characters ==
=== Ignis ===
Lishurian "Ignis" (リシュリア星人 イグニス, Rishuria Seijin Igunisu) is a 334-year-old treasure hunter who aims for world class treasures, hence his intergalactic adventures lead him to Earth. 100 years prior to the series, Ignis survived the destruction of Planet Lishuria after Hudram terrorized it, swearing vengeance on the dark giant ever since. In the present day, Ignis crosses paths with GUTS-Select on multiple occasions after an attempt on targeting Yuna. Despite his penchant for stealing and meddling with the team, he is willing to lend them his cooperation, especially if it means trying to get back at Hudram. He is well-aware of Kengo's double life as Trigger, but agreed with the youth to keep it to himself. After absorbing Trigger Dark's remains, Ignis eventually obtains the means of transforming into the Ultra through observation of Ribut's power. He is briefly put under GUTS-Select's arrest after his act jeopardized their mission in against Metsu-Orochi, but is freed during the events of Aboras and Banila's assault to assist Trigger. Despite his attempt to restore Planet Lishuria by kidnapping Yuna, he came to realize the bonds he formed with GUTS-Select and finally makes peace with his past tragedy by killing Hudram. After the Giants of Darkness are defeated, Ignis departs from Earth to look for another way to restore Lishuria.

While appearing similar to humans, his face glows the Lishurian's tribal markings if he gets excited. By stealing a GUTS Sparklence prototype from Akito, Ignis modify it into his own Black Sparklence (ブラックスパークレンス, Burakku Supākurensu), using it with the corresponding Hyper Key to transform into Trigger Dark. Akito would later tweaked the Black Sparklence to provide Ignis with full control over Trigger Dark without the berserker tendencies.

Ignis is portrayed by Kei Hosogai (細貝 圭, Hosogai Kei).

=== Yuzare ===
Yuzare (ユザレ) was a white-haired miko from the Ultra-Ancient civilization and commander of the Terran Protection Team (地球星警護団, Chikyū-sei Keigo-dan), as well as the key to Eternity Core. When the Giants of Darkness razed the Ultra-Ancient civilization, Yuzare fought against their forces to prevent them from reaching the Eternity Core. She encountered a time-displaced Kengo and gave him the Ancient Sparklence that would connect him with Trigger Dark. Yuzare died after petrifying the recently defected Trigger and the rest of the Giants of Darkness, but her spirit endured to the present day to lead Kengo to his merging with Trigger in Mars and occasionally conveying her messages to him. Yuzare's spirit took inhabitance within her descendant Yuna, as her growing powers turns them into an open target by the Giants of Darkness in the latter's quest for the Eternity Core. After Kengo returned from his time travel, she bestowed the youth with a piece of Eternity Core's power, allowing Kengo/Trigger to transform into Glitter Trigger Eternity.

As detailed in Ultraman Decker, Yuzare would return in the distant future as part of an intergalactic alliance against the invading Sphere forces. When Agams time traveled into the present era and Megalothor resurrecting itself through the Sphere's powers, Yuzare reached to Kengo on Mars to provide him with the Ultra Dual Sword, Trigger's set of Ultra Dimension Cards and the Sphere's Mons Dimension Card to bypass through their barrier on Earth.

Yuzare is portrayed by Runa Toyoda in a dual role with Yuna Shizuma, and is based on the similarly-named character in Ultraman Tiga.

=== Galaxy Rescue Force ===
First appearing in the Ultra Galaxy Fight miniseries, the Galaxy Rescue Force (ギャラクシーレスキューフォース, Gyarakushī Resukyū Fōsu) is an intergalactic peacekeeping organization consist of elite warriors who protect the intelligent life forms from danger. The group's exploits are explored in the Galaxy Rescue Force Voice Drama miniseries. During the events of Ultra Galaxy Fight: The Destined Crossroad, Father of Ultra employs the help of Galaxy Rescue Force in Yullian's rescue operation in the height of Land of Light's war with the Absolutians.

- Ultraman Ribut: See above
- Sora: See below.
- Ultraman Regulos: See above
- Lion Sacred Beast Gukulushisa (獅子聖獣 グクルシーサー, Shishi Seijū Gukuru Shīsā): A race of monster who served as guardians in planets with intelligent life forms. As more Gukulushisa keep disappearing one after another due to advancing civilizations, Queen Izana managed to find and inducted them as members of the Galaxy Rescue Force.
- Andro Melos (アンドロメロス, Andoro Merosu): The former leader of the Andro Defense Force, who had since retired to join the Galaxy Rescue Force under Queen Izana's offer, as well as entrusting his former position to the new recruit Andro Ares. After a mission with Ribut, Melos recounted the history of obtaining the Andro Melos alias to both Ribut and Sora. Tomohiro Yamaguchi (山口 智広, Yamaguchi Tomohiro) reprises his voice role as Andro Melos, with Jeff Manning doing the same in the English dub of Ultra Galaxy Fight: The Destined Crossroad and Ultraman Regulos: First Mission.
- Queen Izana (イザナ女王, Izana-joō): The queen of Planet Kanon at some point before Amate's ascension to the throne. According to Galaxy Rescue Force Voice Drama, she is not from Planet Kanon in the universe of Ultraman Orb: The Origin Saga. Kei Shindō (真堂 圭, Shindō Kei) reprises her voice role as Queen Izana, with Rumiko Varnes doing the same in the English dub of Ultra Galaxy Fight: The Destined Crossroad and Ultraman Regulos: First Mission.
- Space Agent Kenis (宇宙工作員 ケニス, Uchū Kōsaku-in Kenisu): A member from Nebula KJ-K5 and an expert in running special covert missions. Originally a member of the race known as the Space Agent from episode 7 of Ultraman Max, Kenis came to disagree with his people's aggressive methods in blowing up warlike civilizations and deserted them in order to join the Galaxy Rescue Force. He is voiced by Seigo Yamada (山田 成吾, Yamada Seigo).
- Poccola (ポッコラ, Pokkora): A member from Nebula Piccola who is friends with Piccolo from episode 46 of Ultraman Taro. He is voiced by Hiiro (ひいろ).
- Dark Alien Alien Babarue RB (暗黒星人 ババルウ星人 RB, Ankoku Seijin Babarū Seijin Āru Bī): (Note: In the Mega Monster Battle instalments, the "RB" (short for Reionics Battler (レイオニクスバトラー, Reionikusu Batorā)) is a designation given to aliens with Reionics DNA. In the GRF Voice Drama, Babarue adopted the "RB" designation as his personal name.) Originally a Reionics from episode 4 of Ultra Galaxy Mega Monster Battle: Never Ending Odyssey, who had previously lost to Rei after challenging the human with Antlar. At some point after the end of Reionics Battle, RB acquired a Nova and used it to commit thievery in order to make ends meet. After his action was discovered by the Galaxy Rescue Force, Andro Melos offered RB to join the team out of pity, with Kenis taking the Babarue under his wing. He is voiced by Tatsuya Hashimoto (橋本 達也, Hashimoto Tatsuya), his race first appearing in episode 38 of Ultraman Leo.
- Three-Faced Phantom Dada "Daada" (三面怪人 ダダ ダーダ, Sanmen Kaijin Dada Dāda): A member of the Galaxy Rescue Force's Science Technology division. Actually a villain, he sought to use Sora to control the whole galaxy before being killed alongside his three monsters by the Galaxy Rescue Force members. He is voiced by You Murakami, his race first appearing in episode 28 of Ultraman.

=== Cosmo Beast Fighters ===
The Cosmo Beast Fighters (コスモ幻獣闘士, Kosumo Genjū Tōshi) were practitioners of the Cosmo Beast Style (コスモ幻獣拳, Kosumo Genjū-ken), a martial art that is rumored to be the strongest in the universe by making a contract with the Cosmo Beast (コスモビースト, Kosumo Bīsuto) spirits. The martial art school used to be situated on Planet D60 (D60(ディーリューシー)星, Dī Ryūshī Sei) of Draco Constellation, a brother planet to L77, wherein the Magma Invasion Army's attack on both planets caused the martial art school to defunct.

Practitioners of Cosmo Beast Fighters made their cameo in flashback scenes of The Destined Crossroad before their full appearance in Ultraman Regulos spin-off series. In addition, remains of the practitioners' powers are salvaged by Regulos in the form of energy orbs, which allows him and the Leo Brothers to utilize their combined powers in defeating Absolute Diavolo on Planet Blizzard.

- Master Alude (マスターアルーデ, Masutā Arūde): A bovine alien and the grandmaster of the Cosmo Beast Style, who took an amnesiac Regulos under the school's training. He was killed by Diavolo to obtain the Juggernaut Charging Buffalo Fist and the title of the grand master for his own, the latter of which is adopted by Regulos once Diavolo was defeated on Planet Blizzard. He is voiced by Akio Ōtsuka (大塚 明夫, Ōtsuka Akio) in Japanese, who previously voiced Ultraman Powered in the Japanese dub of Ultraman: The Ultimate Hero, and by Charles Glover in the English dub.
- Instructor Phoros (インストラクターフォロス, Insutorakutā Forosu): A white tiger-themed instructor with extreme dedication to the Cosmo Beast Style. He masters the Lightning White Tiger Fist, which grants him electrokinesis and represents the first half of Regulos' current powers. Together with Tubahn, he sacrificed himself to shield Regulos from Volcan's attack. He is voiced by Kenjirō Tsuda (津田 健次郎, Tsuda Kenjirō) in Japanese, who previously voiced Zarab in Shin Ultraman, and by Maxwell Powers in the English dub.
- Tubahn (トゥバーン, Tubān): Instructor Phoros' draconic older brother who, despite his carefree attitude, was an adept at accurately striking an opponent's weak spot. He masters the Flaming Red Dragon Fist, which grants him pyrokinesis and represents the other half of Regulos' current powers. Together with Instructor Phoros, he sacrificed himself to shield Regulos from Volcan's attack. He is voiced by Toshiyuki Morikawa (森川 智之, Morikawa Toshiyuki) in Japanese, who previously voiced Kenichi Kai in the Japanese dub of Ultraman: The Ultimate Hero, and by Michael Jose Rivas-Micoud in the English dub.
- Spica (スピカ, Supika): A feline alien who cares for Regulos with mastery over Rapid Frozen Panther Fist (高速凍豹拳, Kōsoku Tōhyō-ken), which grants her cryokinesis and firing ice spikes. She sacrificed herself to shield Regulos from Diavolo's attack. Remains of her power was used by Regulos in his confrontation against Diavolo on Planet Blizzard. She is voiced by Miku Itō (伊藤 美来, Itō Miku) in Japanese, and by Soness Stevens in the English dub.
- Albeo (アルビオ, Arubio): A birdlike alien and a senior disciple to Regulos with mastery over Leaping Spirit Crane Fist (飛翔精鶴拳, Hishō Seikaku-ken), which grants him aerokinesis and enhanced agility. He was killed by Volcan. Remains of his power was used by Regulos in his fight against Baraba on Planet D60 and by Leo in his confrontation against Diavolo on Planet Blizzard. He is voiced by Toshiki Masuda (増田 俊樹, Masuka Toshiki) in Japanese, and by Mark Stein in the English dub.
- Pharood (ファルード, Farūdo): A serpentine alien and a senior disciple to Regulos with mastery over Phantom Water Snake Fist (幻影水蛇拳, Gen'ei Suija-ken). He was killed by Volcan. Remains of his power was used by Regulos in his fight against Baraba on Planet D60 and by Astra in his confrontation against Diavolo on Planet Blizzard. He is voiced by Tomoaki Maeno (前野 智昭, Maeno Tomoaki) in Japanese, who previously voiced Kotaro Higashi in the anime adaptation of Ultraman manga, and by Dario Toda in the English dub.
- Dias: See here

== Ultra Warriors ==
=== Ultraman Trigger ===
Ultraman Trigger (ウルトラマントリガー, Urutoraman Torigā) is the titular Ultra of his eponymous series, who has a passing resemblance to Ultraman Tiga. 30 million years prior in the distant past, Trigger was once the fourth member of the Giant of Darkness, whose fighting strength surpasses his own peers, but a time-displaced Kengo managed to convince him to defect to the light. By joining forces with the Terran Protection Team, he helped banishing his former comrades to the edge of the universe before his petrified form laid to rest in an inverted pyramid on Mars.

His inner light was reincarnated into the present day as Kengo Manaka, who merges with the Ultra's petrified statue on Mars to resurrect him in the fight against his former comrades. Trigger would later be separated from his original form, Trigger Dark, when Kengo returned from the past and gaining an additional power from the Eternity Core. After defeating Megalothor, Trigger/Kengo merge with the Eternity Core to stabilize it. He would return two years later in Episode Z to fight against the rampaging monsters, Evil Trigger and the Celebro possessed-Ultraman Z. Alongside Kengo, Trigger returns to Earth during the events of Ultraman Decker in the middle of Sphere's campaign on Earth, using their Mons Dimension Card as a conduit. Meeting his successor Decker, the two fought against Sphere Megalothor and successfully rescued Carmeara, eventually leaving Earth once again with the dark Ultra in unison.

Trigger's main weapon is the Circle Arms (サークルアームズ, Sākuru Āmuzu), which consists of three forms; the default Multi Sword (マルチソード, Maruchi Sōdo), the scissors-like Power Claw (パワークロー, Pawā Kurō) and the bow-like Sky Arrow (スカイアロー, Sukai Arō). At the time of early defection from his teammates, Trigger splits into three separate figures that eventually become his Type Changes in the present day. In the same vein as Ultraman Tiga, Trigger assumes one of his preferable Type Change (タイプチェンジ, Taipu Chenji) forms per combat situations, with his Circle Arms also following in-suit: At some point during his decade-long departure, Trigger obtained the Ultra Dual Sword and is also capable of using it through its corresponding Hyper Key, before passing the weapon to his successor, Decker.

- Multi Type (マルチタイプ, Maruchi Taipu): Trigger's default red/purple-colored form, a balanced fighter who is capable of fighting in all forms of terrestrial areas. Like Tiga, his finishing move is the Zeperion Beam (ゼペリオン光線, Zeperion Kōsen).
- Power Type (パワータイプ, Pawā Taipu): Trigger's red-colored form that focuses on brute strength and close combat. His finishing move is the Deracium Beam Torrent (デラシウム光流, Derashiumu Kōryū).
- Sky Type (スカイタイプ, Sukai Taipu): Trigger's light blue/purple-colored form that focuses on high speed and aerial combat. His finishing move is the Runboldt Beam Shell (ランバルト光弾, Ranbaruto Kōdan).

Trigger's other forms include:

- Trigger Dark: See below
- Glitter Trigger Eternity (グリッタートリガーエタニティ, Gurittā Torigā Etaniti): Trigger's strongest form, obtained as a result of Kengo receiving the Ultra-Ancient light and a piece of Eternity Core's energy. The Triangle Crystals (トライアングルクリスタル, Toraianguru Kurisutaru) on his chest allows him to combine the abilities of his previous Type Changes and summons the Glitter Blade (グリッターブレード, Gurittā Burēdo) as his personal weapon. Without his signature weapon, Glitter Trigger Eternity's finishing move is the Glitter Zeperion Beam (グリッターゼペリオン光線, Gurittā Zeperion Kōsen). However, due to the form's massive power, it tends to exhaust Trigger quickly in the battle until Kengo receives a special training from Ribut. Kengo would later share the power of Glitter Trigger Eternity to Ignis/Trigger Dark during the latter's final confrontation with Hudram.
- Trigger Truth (トリガートゥルース, Torigā Turūsu): Trigger's final form after temporarily reabsorbing his splintered Trigger Dark half in the fight against Carmeara, in addition to an energy boost from the Eternity Core itself. His finishing moves are the True Zeperion Beam (トゥルーゼペリオン光線, Turū Zeperion Kōsen), True Timer Flash (トゥルータイマーフラッシュ, Turū Taimā Furasshu) and the True Bomber Strike (トゥルーボンバーストライク, Turū Bonbā Sutoraiku).

His vocal grunts are provided by Raiga Terasaka, who is also the actor of Kengo Manaka. Raiga also portrayed Trigger's mental image in episode 12 after revealing himself as Kengo's previous incarnation.

=== Trigger Dark ===
Dark Champion Trigger Dark (闇黒勇士 トリガーダーク, Ankoku Yūshi Torigā Dāku) is Ultraman Trigger's black-colored original form during his early days as a member of the Giants of Darkness. The form was lost after a time-displaced Kengo established contact with Trigger to thwart his former comrades from exploiting the Eternity Core, followed by his petrifaction by Yuzare.

In the present day, Carmeara uses her spell to corrupt Trigger's husk back to his original form. By the time Kengo returned from his time-displaced trip, Trigger Dark exists as a separate being who is driven to destroy everything on sight; including his former companions and is forced to be defeated by Glitter Trigger Eternity. The dark Ultra survived by having his essence absorbed into Ignis and the treasure hunter acquiring his own means of transforming into Trigger Dark. Despite his merger, Ignis initially has no real control due to Trigger Dark's berserker tendencies feeding his grudge against Hudram, until Akito tweaked the Black Sparklence to negate its side effects. After Hudram's death, Trigger Dark's power is temporarily fused with Ultraman Trigger to form Trigger Truth in order to put an end to Megalothor's reign of terror.

His finishing move is the Dark Zeperion Beam (ダークゼペリオン光線, Dāku Zeperion Kōsen), in addition to a few set of powers that his present self would use. In combat, Trigger Dark can also harness the power of past monsters through the use of their Monster Keys and wielding the original Trigger's Circle Arms.

- Zaigorg Key (ザイゴーグキー, Zaigōgu Kī): Grants Trigger Dark the ability to conjure energy spikes and brute strength akin to Power Type.
- Horoboros Key (ホロボロスキー, Horoborosu Kī): Grants Trigger Dark the ability to conjure lightning bolts and super speed akin to Sky Type.

Following his merger with Ignis, Trigger Dark's vocal grunts are provided by the latter's actor, Kei Hosogai. He is the reinterpretation of Tiga Dark from Ultraman Tiga: The Final Odyssey.

=== Ultraman Decker ===
Ultraman Decker (ウルトラマンデッカー, Urutoraman Dekkā) is the titular Ultra of his eponymous series, who has a passing resemblance to Ultraman Dyna. Decker's true identity is the form of his human namesake who fights against the invading Spheres alongside a group of resistance forces, some of which includes a future Yuzare. When Agams went rogue and brings the Sphere to the past with him, Decker is unable to chase the alien and can only pass his Ultraman powers to his ancestor, Kanata Asumi, in order to fight against the threat of Sphere. The Ultra remains fighting with Kanata until the destruction of the Mother Spheresaurus has him parting ways with the young boy.

Through his human host, Decker is capable of assuming Type Changes to access three forms that suit his combat situations. With the Ultra Dimension Cards accessed by Kanata, Decker can also utilize specific one-time support attacks during his battles. After inheriting the Ultra Dual Sword (ウルトラデュアルソード, Urutora Dyuaru Sōdo) from Trigger, Decker can use it as his handheld weapon, regardless of any Type Change he assume and can channel the powers of Dimension Cards into it.

- Flash Type (フラッシュタイプ, Furasshu Taipu): Decker's default form that is balanced in terms of fighting style and ranged beam attacks. His finishing move is the Selgend Beam (セルジェンド光線, Serujendo Kōsen).
- Strong Type (ストロングタイプ, Sutorongu Taipu): A brutish red colored form with emphasis for brute strength and close combat. His finishing move is the Dolnade Breaker (ドルネイドブレイカー, Doruneido Bureikā).
- Miracle Type (ミラクルタイプ, Mirakuru Taipu): A blue colored form that specializes in psychokinesis and splitting into three separate clones. His finishing move is the Realiut Wave (レアリュートウェーブ, Rearyūto Wēbu).
- Dynamic Type (ダイナミックタイプ, Dainamikku Taipu): Decker's strongest form, which grants him the use of Decker Shield Calibur (デッカーシールドカリバー, Dekkā Shīrudo Karibā) that can function as both a double-edged sword and a shield. His finishing move is the Dymude Beam (ダイミュード光線, Daimyūdo Kōsen).

His grunts are provided by Hiroki Matsumoto, Kanata's actor. Meanwhile, the voice of Decker in Kanata's flashback of episode 15 is provided by Masashi Taniguchi, who also portrays the Ultra's human namesake.

==== Ultraman Dinas ====
Ultraman Dinas (ウルトラマンディナス, Urutoraman Dinasu) is the purple Ultra who appears exclusively in Ultraman Decker Finale: Journey to Beyond. His true identity is Ultraman Decker at an incomplete state, who was born from the female Lavian of the same name when Ultraman Dyna resurrects her through his power. Together, the two Ultras fought against the invading forces of aliens on Planet Lavie before Dyna left for parts unknown, while Dinas and his host namesake traces Gibellus' forces all the way to Earth wherein the two join forces with GUTS-Select members. Dinas teams up Terraphaser to fight against Zor-Gigalogaiser but both of them were defeated. Dinas is then evolved into Decker when the Lavian namesake and the rest of the GUTS-Select members use their power of bonds to resurrect Kanata from his death, resulting in Decker's return to Earth to finally destroy Gigalogaiser.

Because of the Lavian's peaceful nature as a whole, Dinas is not a proficient fighter but compensates it using his ability to harness the powers of monsters through the Mons Dimension Cards. His finishing moves are Dinalize Burns (ディナライズバーンズ, Dinaraizu Bānzu) through the power of Zetton and Dinalize Thunder (ディナライズサンダー, Dinaraizu Sandā) through the power of Eleking.

Ultraman Dinas is voiced by Kayano Nakamura, who also portrays his human host of the same name.

=== Other Ultra Warriors ===
- Inter-Galactic Defense Force (宇宙警備隊, Uchū Keibitai; UGF: TDC, UR: FM): A peacekeeping organization in the Land of Light that was established after Alien Empera's defeat and his army retreating from Nebula M78.
  - Father of Ultra (ウルトラの父, Urutora no Chichi; UGF: TDC, UR: FM): The top commander of the Inter-Galactic Defense Force. He issues the war with Absolutians after the latter race kidnapped Yullian as a hostage. Hajime Iijima (飯島 肇, Iijima Hajime) and Alexander Hunter reprise their voice role as Father of Ultra in Japanese and English dub of The Destined Crossroad, respectively.
  - Mother of Ultra (ウルトラの母, Urutora no Haha; UGF: TDC, UR: FM): The Father of Ultra's wife. Suzuko Mimori (三森 すずこ, Mimori Suzuko) and Hannah Grace reprise their voice role as Mother of Ultra in Japanese and English dub of The Destined Crossroad, respectively.
  - Ultra Brothers (ウルトラ兄弟, Urutora Kyōdai; UGF: TDC, UR: FM): A division of 11 Ultras known for their contribution on a different planet Earth.
    - Zoffy (ゾフィー, Zofī; UGF: TDC, UR: FM): The Commander of the Inter-Galactic Defense Force and the leader of Ultra Brothers. Under Ultraman King's advise, Zoffy and Taro brought along the Leo Brothers in an attempt to stop the ensuing war between Ultras and Absolutians. Shunsuke Takeuchi (武内 駿輔, Takeuchi Shunsuke) and Ryan Drees reprise their voice role as Zoffy in Japanese and English dub of The Destined Crossroad, respectively.
    - Ultraman (ウルトラマン, Urutoraman; UGF: TDC, UR: FM): See here.
    - Ultraseven (ウルトラセブン, Urutorasebun; UGF: TDC): See here.
    - Ultraman Jack (ウルトラマンジャック, Urutoraman Jakku; UGF: TDC, UR: FM): See here.
    - Ultraman Ace (ウルトラマンエース, Urutoraman Ēsu; 19, UGF: TDC): He is voiced by Tomokazu Seki (関 智一, Seki Tomokazu) in Japanese and by Charles Glover in the English dub.
    - Ultraman Taro (ウルトラマンタロウ, Urutoraman Tarō; UGF: TDC): See here.
    - Ultraman Leo (ウルトラマンレオ, Urutoraman Reo; UGF: TDC): An Ultra who serves Ultraman King as the former's right hand man. Alongside Astra, Leo joins Zoffy and Taro to stop the ensuing war between the Ultras and Absolutians. He is voiced by Yoshimasa Hosoya (細谷 佳正, Hosoya Yoshimasa) in Japanese and by Iain Gibb in the English dub respectively.
    - Astra (アストラ, Asutora; UGF: TDC): Leo's younger twin brother that makes up the second member of the Leo Brothers duo. He is voiced by Takahiro Mizushima (水島 大宙, Mizushima Takahiro) in Japanese, and by Matthew Masaru Barron in the English dub respectively.
    - Ultraman Mebius (ウルトラマンメビウス, Urutoraman Mebiusu; UGF: TDC): See here.
    - Ultraman Hikari (ウルトラマンヒカリ, Urutoraman Hikari; UGF: TDC): A blue-colored Ultra and Mebius' partner during their time on Earth. Keiichi Nanba (難波 圭一, Nanba Keiichi) and Chris Wells reprise their voice role as Ultraman Hikari in Japanese and English dub of The Destined Crossroad, respectively.
  - Yullian (ユリアン, Yurian; UGF: TDC): The royal princess from the Land of Light, who is currently imprisoned in Narak by The Kingdom as a bargaining chip against her home world. Yullian met Regulos in her prison and recognizes his affiliation to the Cosmo Beast Fist. Haruka Tomatsu (戸松 遥, Tomatsu Haruka) and Hannah Grace reprise their voice role as Yullian in Japanese and English dub of The Destined Crossroad, respectively.
  - Ultraman Great (ウルトラマングレート, Urutoraman Gurēto; UR: FM): Alongside Powered and the Ultra Force, he is assigned by Zoffy to deal against a Parallel Isotope of Alien Reiblood on Planet Maijii (惑星マイジー, Wakusei Maijī). Tomokazu Seki and Eric Kelso reprise their voice role as Ultraman Great in Japanese and English dub respectively.
  - Ultraman Powered (ウルトラマンパワード, Urutoraman Pawādo; UR: FM): Alongside Great and the Ultra Force, he is assigned by Zoffy to Planet Maijii. Toshiyuki Morikawa and Kane Kosugi reprise their voice role as Ultraman Powered in Japanese and English dub respectively.
  - Ultraman Neos (ウルトラマンネオス, Urutoraman Neosu; GRF Voice Drama, UGF: TDC): A member of the Elite Task Force. In Galaxy Rescue Force Voice Drama, Neos assists Ribut and Melos in their fight against a Bemstar, later mentioning his past association to GRF for volunteering to be Gukuru Shisa's sparring partner, leading to the two bonding together and the Ultra learning to understand the meaning of its growls. Ryuya Yazuka (八塚 竜也, Yazuka Ryūya) reprises his voice role as Ultraman Neos.
  - Ultraseven 21 (ウルトラセブン21, Urutorasebun Tsū Wan; GRF Voice Drama, UGF: TDC): Neos' partner and a member of the Galactic Security Agency. Kenta Matsumoto (松本 健太, Matsumoto Kenta) reprises his voice role as Ultraseven 21, with Josh Keller doing the same in the English dub of The Destined Crossroad.
  - Ultraman Xenon (ウルトラマンゼノン, Urutoraman Zenon; GRF Voice Drama, UGF: TDC): Ultraman Max's partner and a fellow Civilization Guardian. Ryota Iwasaki (岩崎 諒太, Iwasaki Ryōta) reprises his voice role as Ultraman Xenon, with Iain Gibb doing the same in the English dub of The Destined Crossroad.
  - Ultraman Zero (ウルトラマンゼロ, Urutoraman Zero; UGF: TDC): See here.
- Ultraman King (ウルトラマンキング, Urutoraman Kingu; UGF: TDC): An elderly Ultra warrior residing in Planet King. After hearing Zoffy and Taro's report of the ensuing fight between Ultras and Absolutians, King sent down the Leo Brothers to accompany the former two in stopping the upcoming conflict between two races. Nobuyuki Hiyama (檜山 修之, Hiyama Nobuyuki) reprises his voice role as Ultraman King since Ultraman Geed, while Charles Glover voiced the character in English dub.
- Ultraman Joneus (ウルトラマンジョーニアス, Urutoraman Jōniasu; GRF Voice Drama, UGF: TDC): The strongest warrior in Planet U40. In Galaxy Rescue Force Voice Drama, Joneus meets with Queen Izana and later on solving an Alien Valky's issue with his pet Samekujira. In The Destined Crossroad, Joneus is tasked with training the new rookies of Inter-Galactic Defense Force and took Zero under his wing. Nobuaki Kanemitsu (金光 宣明, Kanemitsu Nobuaki) reprises his voice role as Ultraman Joneus, with Ryan Drees doing the same in the English dub of The Destined Crossroad.
- Ultra Force (ウルトラフォース, Urutora Fōsu; UGF: TDC, UR: FM): A trio of Ultras from Planet Altara of Nebula M78 who debuted in the 1987 animation film Ultraman: The Adventure Begins. In The Destined Crossroad, the trio are assigned by Zoffy to guard the slumbering Ultraman Noa on Planet Babel from Absolute Titan's invasion. In Ultraman Regulos: First Mission, alongside Great and Powered, the trio are assigned by Zoffy to Planet Maijii.
  - Ultraman Scott (ウルトラマンスコット, Urutoraman Sukotto; UGF: TDC, UR: FM): He is reprised by Tōru Furuya (古谷 徹, Furuya Tōru) in Japanese and voiced by Dante Carver in the English dub respectively.
  - Ultraman Chuck (ウルトラマンチャック, Urutoraman Chakku; UGF: TDC, UR: FM): He is voiced by Masaki Terasoma (てらそま まさき, Terasoma Masaki) in Japanese and by Sean Nichols in the English dub, the latter previously portraying Sean White in Ultraman Max.
  - Ultrawoman Beth (ウルトラウーマンベス, Urutoraūman Besu; UGF: TDC, UR: FM): She is voiced by Asami Seto (瀬戸 麻沙美, Seto Asami) in Japanese and by Maria Theresa Gow in the English dub, the latter previously portraying Georgie Leland in Ultraman Gaia.
- Ultraman Zearth (ウルトラマンゼアス, Urutoraman Zeasu; UGF: TDC): A fastidious Ultra from Land of Bright, who became fast friends with Nice, Boy and Grigio after a sparring match in the Ultra Colosseum. He is voiced by You Murakami in Japanese and by Robert Baldwin in English respectively.
- Ultraman Tiga (ウルトラマンティガ, Urutoraman Tiga): See here.
- Ultraman Dyna (ウルトラマンダイナ, Urutoraman Daina; UGF: TDC, 15, 21, 22, Movie (Decker)): Tiga's successor from the Neo Frontier era, who manifested through Ultraman Z Gamma Future's Gamma Illusion to fight against a troop of Legionoids in The Destined Crossroad. In the distant future of Ultraman Decker, Dyna is part of the alliance formed by mankind to fight against the invading Sphere forces. He jumped into the present day when Sphere-Geomos used its powers to bring several Spheresaurus from the future, inadvertently bringing Dyna as well. Dyna joins forces with the Kanata/the present-day Decker and provides him with the cards of his and Tiga's powers. Before leaving, Dyna reassures Kanata that the future is not set in stone, countering Agams' retorts of blaming mankind for Planet Bazdo's fall.
- Ultraman Gaia (ウルトラマンガイア, Urutoraman Gaia; UGF: TDC): An Ultra who represents the Gaia hypothesis. He is manifested alongside Tiga and Dyna through Z Gamma Future's Gamma Illusion to fight a troop of Darklops and Legionoids.
- Ultraman Nice (ウルトラマンナイス, Urutoraman Naisu; UGF: TDC): An Ultra from TOY 1, a neighboring planet in the Nebula M78. While sparring with Zearth to participate in Yullian's rescue mission, he became fast friends with Boy and Grigio. His voice role is reprised by Hiroshi Miyasaka (宮坂 ひろし, Miyasaka Hiroshi) in Japanese, whereas in the English dub, he is voiced by Ike Nwala.
- Ultraman Boy (ウルトラマンボーイ, Urutoraman Bōi; UGF: TDC): A Land of Light Ultra whose age is the equivalent of an elementary school student. As with his debut from Ultraman Boy's Ultra Colosseum, Boy's crush on Yullian prompts him to train alongside Zearth and Nice in hopes of participating in Yullian's rescue mission, eventually the three finding themselves befriending Grigio. He is voiced by Kagami Kawazu (河津 香賀美, Kawazu Kagami) in Japanese and by Soness Stevens in English dub respectively.
- Ultraman Cosmos (ウルトラマンコスモス, Urutoraman Kosumosu; UGF: TDC): A pacifistic Ultra who is hunted down by the Absolutians due to his role in fusing into either Ultraman Legend or Ultraman Saga. In Planet Juran, Cosmos was able to destroy the Absolutian invaders despite Lidorias' role as a hostage. Taiyo Sugiura (杉浦 太陽, Sugiura Taiyō) and Peter von Gomm reprise their voice role as Ultraman Cosmos in Japanese and English dub of The Destined Crossroad, respectively.
- Ultraman Justice (ウルトラマンジャスティス, Urutoraman Jasutisu; GRF Voice Drama, UGF: TDC): A representative of Universal Justice. Justice went to meet with Queen Izana in Galaxy Rescue Force Voice Drama, following Tartarus' attack in chapter 1 of The Absolute Conspiracy. Megumi Han (潘 めぐみ, Han Megumi) reprises her voice role as Ultraman Justice, with Rumiko Varnes doing the same in the English dub of The Destined Crossroad.
- Ultraman Nexus (ウルトラマンネクサス, Urutoraman Nekusasu; UGF: TDC): See here.
- Sora (ソラ; UGF: TDC): A scientist from the Land of Light. Alongside her childhood friend Ribut, events from their early days in GRF are presented in the Galaxy Rescue Force Voice Drama. Megumi Han reprised her voice role as Sora, while Rumiko Varnes voiced her in The Destined Crossroad's English dub.
- New Generation Hero (ニュージェネレーションヒーロー, Nyū Jenerēshon Hīrō; UGF: TDC): A team of Ultra Warriors starting from Ultraman Ginga to Ultraman Z. Excluding Ultraman Z, eleven members had the ability to fuse together into Ultraman Reiga (ウルトラマンレイガ, Urutoraman Reiga).
  - Ultraman Gingavictory (ウルトラマンギンガビクトリー, Urutoraman Gingabikutorī; UGF: TDC): The fusion of Ginga and Victory.
    - Ultraman Ginga (ウルトラマンギンガ, Urutoraman Ginga; UGF: TDC): An Ultraman who came from future. Takuya Negishi (根岸 拓哉, Negishi Takuya) and Peter von Gomm reprise their voice role as Ultraman Ginga in the Japanese and English dub respectively.
    - Ultraman Victory (ウルトラマンビクトリー, Urutoraman Bikutorī; UGF: TDC): Ginga's partner from Victorian. Kiyotaka Uji (宇治 清高, Uji Kiyotaka) and Michael Jose Rivas-Micoud reprise their voice role as Ultraman Victory in Japanese and English dub respectively.
  - Ultraman X (ウルトラマンエックス, Urutoraman Ekkusu; UGF: TDC): Kensuke Takahashi (高橋 健介, Takahashi Kensuke) and Mark Stein reprise their voice role as Ultraman X in Japanese and English dub respectively.
  - Ultraman Orb (ウルトラマンオーブ, Urutoraman Ōbu; UGF: TDC): Hideo Ishiguro (石黒 英雄, Ishiguro Hideo) and Chris Wells reprise their voice role as Ultraman Orb in Japanese and English dub respectively.
  - Ultraman Geed (ウルトラマンジード, Urutoraman Jīdo; UGF: TDC): Tatsuomi Hamada (濱田 龍臣, Hamada Tatsuomi) and Dario Toda reprise their voice role as Ultraman Geed in Japanese and English dub respectively.
  - Ultraman Ruebe (ウルトラマンルーブ, Urutoraman Rūbu; UGF: TDC): The fusion of Rosso and Blu.
    - Ultraman Rosso (ウルトラマンロッソ, Urutoraman Rosso; UGF: TDC): Yuya Hirata (平田 雄也, Hirata Yūya) and Jeff Manning reprise their voice role as Ultraman Rosso in the Japanese and English dub respectively.
    - Ultraman Blu (ウルトラマンブル, Urutoraman Buru; UGF: TDC): Ryosuke Koike (小池 亮介, Koike Ryōsuke) and Ryan Drees reprise their voice role as Ultraman Blu in Japanese and English dub respectively.
  - Ultrawoman Grigio (ウルトラウーマングリージョ, Urutoraūman Gurījo; UGF: TDC): Rosso and Blu's younger sister. Arisa Sonohara (其原 有沙, Sonohara Arisa) and Rumiko Varnes reprise their voice role as Ultrawoman Grigio in Japanese and English dub of The Destined Crossroad, respectively.
  - Tri-Squad (トライスクワッド, Torai Sukuwaddo; UGF: TDC): A group of three Ultra Warriors from Ultraman Taiga. Following Yullian's capture from the events of The Absolute Conspiracy, the Tri-Squad are assigned to reform the Ultra League by recruiting more members into their alliance, with the entirety of New Generation Heroes as their first candidates.
    - Ultraman Taiga (ウルトラマンタイガ, Urutoraman Taiga; UGF: TDC): The son of Ultraman Taro and the Tri-Squad's team leader. Takuma Terashima (寺島 拓篤, Terashima Takuma) and Matthew Masaru Barron reprise their voice role as Ultraman Taiga in Japanese and English dub of The Destined Crossroad, respectively.
    - Ultraman Titas (ウルトラマンタイタス, Urutoraman Taitasu; UGF: TDC): A U40 Ultra Warrior with emphasis of brute strength. Satoshi Hino (日野 聡, Hino Satoshi) and Jeff Manning reprise their voice role as Ultraman Titas in Japanese and English dub respectively.
    - Ultraman Fuma (ウルトラマンフーマ, Urutoraman Fūma; UGF: TDC): An Ultra from Planet O-50 using speed and stealth techniques. Shōta Hayama (葉山 翔太, Hayama Shōta) and Chris Wells reprise their voice role as Ultraman Fuma in Japanese and English dub respectively.
  - Ultraman Z (ウルトラマンゼット, Urutoraman Zetto; 7, 8, EPZ, UGF: TDC): A rookie member of the Inter-Galactic Defense Force who embarked in various interplanetary rescue missions after the events of Civilization Self-Destruction Game. In The Destined Crossroad, Z and Haruki briefly separated, with the former participating with the rest of the New Generation Heroes in their hunt against the Devil Splinters and eventually finding themselves dragged into the crossfire between the Land of Light and The Kingdom. Through Beliarok and his bond with Haruki, Z is able to access Deathcium Rise Claw (デスシウムライズクロー, Desushiumu Raizu Kurō) as a temporary empowerment in against a Parallel Isotope Belial. In Ultraman Trigger: New Generation Tiga, Z ended up on Kengo's Earth after a chase against Alien Barossa IV to reclaim the stolen King Joe SC, joining forces with GUTS Select and Ultraman Trigger to fight against the alien pirate and the Dada threat before being forced to return to his home dimension. Two years later in Ultraman Trigger: Episode Z, Haruki and Z returns to Kengo's Earth in their hunt for the fugitive Celebro. When Haruki gets possessed by the parasite, Z fell into the creature's manipulation as Red Damage (レッドダメージ, Reddo Damēji), and is forced to assist Zabil/Evil Trigger in against his own allies. Z regains control of his body once Haruki expelled the parasite through Haruki's resolve and Kengo's support. Tasuku Hatanaka (畠中 祐, Hanata Tasuku) reprises his voice role as Ultraman Z, with Peter von Gomm reprising his role as the character in the English dub of The Destined Crossroad.
    - Haruki Natsukawa (ナツカワ ハルキ, Natsukawa Haruki; 7, 8, EPZ): Ultraman Z's human host, who decided to accompany Z in his outer space missions after the events of Civilization Self-Destruction Game, effectively forcing him to part ways with STORAGE as a whole. Haruki was absent during the events of The Destined Crossroad, as he participated in the rebuilding of an alien planet. In Ultraman Trigger: New Generation Tiga, Haruki ended up on Kengo's Earth during a chase against Alien Barossa IV to reclaim the stolen King Joe SC. With his Z Riser being fixed, he used the GUTS Sparklence and GUTS Hyper Keys as his alternative to transform into Z and any of the latter's forms. After fighting against Dada, Haruki entrusted Akito with fixing his Z Riser while being forced to return King Joe SC's remains back to his world. In Episode Z, Haruki had his Z Riser fixed and returned to Kengo's world to recapture Celebro, only to ended up getting possessed by the creature. After expelling the parasite with Kengo's help, Haruki/Z returns to support both Triggers in against Evil Trigger before returning to his home planet when Himari recaptured Celebro in aftermath from the fight. In The Destined Crossroad, Haruki temporarily separated himself from Z due to his participation in a different planet. Kohshu Hirano (平野 宏周, Hirano Kōshū) reprises his role as Haruki Natsukawa.
- Beliarok (ベリアロク, Beriaroku; 7, 8, EPZ, UGF: TDC): A sentient weapon and clone of Ultraman Belial who serves as Ultraman Z's sidearm weapon despite his neutral affiliation. During the events of The Destined Crossroad, Beliarok allows himself to be used by Geed and a Parallel Belial, eventually returning to Z after through observation of the latter's behavior. In Trigger, Bullton's power caused him to be parted with his user and reunited in the middle of Barossa IV's fight with Z, Trigger and GUTS-Select on Kengo's Earth. Yūki Ono (小野 友樹, Ono Yūki) reprises his voice role as Beliarok, while the English dub of The Destined Crossroad features Jack Merluzzi as his voice actor in a dual role with the Parallel Isotope Belial.

== Antagonists ==
=== Giants of Darkness ===
The Giants of Darkness (闇の巨人, Yami no Kyojin) are members of the Clan of Darkness (闇の一族, Yami no Ichizoku) and the antagonists of Ultraman Trigger: New Generation Tiga. 30 million years prior to the series, they came to Earth to obtain the Eternity Core (エタニティコア, Etaniti Koa), a strong energy substance which can be used to reshape the entire universe. Originally consisting of four warriors, their strongest member, Trigger Dark, defected to support the Terran Protection Team and banished their petrified forms to the opposite ends of the universe. Once all three of them are reawakened and reunited in the present day, the trio made multiple attempts in facing against Kengo and his comrades, either through their sheer strength or the ability to command monsters under their will. Following their failed attempts at getting Trigger back to their side and Kyrieloid placing them under his trance, the team starts to dwindle as Hudram left on his own accord, followed by Darrgon once Carmeara begins to lose grip on her sanity, eventually leaving her as the sole survivor once absorbing their leftover darknesses.

The trio is based on the similarly named team from Ultraman Tiga: The Final Odyssey. This decision is done due to Ultraman Tiga's past association with his former allies, hence the three giants in Trigger having past association to the titular Ultra as well.

==== Carmeara ====
Captivating Warrior Carmeara (妖麗戦士 カルミラ, Yōrei Senshi Karumira) is the gold-colored leader of the Giants of Darkness. Originally in the distant past, she was once Trigger Dark's lover and is scorned over her former lover's defection. In addition to her mission in targeting Yuna/Yuzare for the access to Eternity Core, Carmeara extended her rivalry to Kengo after discovering the youth's involvement in Trigger's defection and for obtaining the Eternity Core. As the series progresses, Carmeara's mental health starts to take its toll as she absorbs Hudram and Darrgon for their attempts in deserting her and finally transforms into Megalothor after gaining access to the Eternity Core, eventually dying in Trigger's arms following Megalothor's destruction once she learns to appreciate the light. A decade later in Ultraman Decker, Carmeara is simultaneously resurrected through Megalothor's assimilation with the Spheres. Through Decker and Yuzare's help, she escapes from the monster and join forces with the Ultra to destroy it before joining Kengo/Trigger in departing from Earth, hoping to find a place where she could lay the spirits of Darrgon and Hudram to rest.

In battle, she can summon either the Carmeara Whip (カルミラウィップ, Karumira Wippu) or the Carmeara Baton (カルミラバトン, Karumira Baton) from her right hand. She can also assume a human disguise while retaining her original powers at a smaller rate.

Carmeara is voiced by Sumire Uesaka (上坂 すみれ, Uesaka Sumire), who also portrays her human form. She is the reinterpretation of Camearra from Ultraman Tiga: The Final Odyssey, with Koichi Sakamoto noting that his wife (Motoko Nagino) used to be the suit actress of the dark Ultra and saw her as a source of inspiration, hence being particular to the former character.

==== Darrgon ====
Herculean Fighter Darrgon (剛力闘士 ダーゴン, Gōriki Tōshi Dāgon) is the red-colored and armored Giant of Darkness who finds enjoyment in fighting, especially in against those he considered as worthy opponents. Darrgon was awakened in the present day by Carmeara to challenge Trigger on Earth after Gymaira's destruction and resumed his team's original goal once Hudram rejoined them. Although his team's main mission is to target Yuna/Yuzare for the location of Eternity Core, Darrgon finds himself conflicted with his mission after his growing feelings for Yuna and his newfound respect for mankind as a whole. Seeing how his group became disjointed from Hudram's treachery and Carmeara's descent into madness, Darrgon attempts to quit, but was brainwashed into fighting against Trigger and hunting Yuna. He was later given a mercy kill by Akito via the Nursedessei, with his essence absorbed by Carmeara as part of her transformation into Megalothor.

Because of his thirst for battle, Darrgon is a straightforward person who prefers fair fight and detests cheating. In battle, Darrgon emphasizes the use of brute strength as his sole weapon. His finishing move is the Fire Beat Crusher (ファイヤービートクラッシャー, Faiyā Bīto Kurasshā).

Darrgon is voiced by Shunichi Maki (真木 駿一, Maki Shun'ichi), previously voicing Alien Gapiya "Abel" in Ultraman Taiga. He is the reinterpretation of Darramb from Ultraman Tiga: The Final Odyssey.

==== Hudram ====
Agile Tactician Hudram (俊敏策士 ヒュドラム, Shunbin Sakushi Hyudoramu) is the blue-colored Giant of Darkness who served as the team's combat strategist, using various forms of tricks while having a hidden brutal side. Although he is the last to appear on Earth, Hudram was awakened at a century earlier than his peers and destroyed multiple planets out of boredom, including Ignis' home planet Lishuria. At some point after Darrgon's reawakening, Hudram targeted Yuna in order to draw out Yuzare's spirit and even enlisted Gazort to his aid, only to be dragged out of the battle by his peers to keep his temper in check. Seeing Carmeara's inability to move past her love for Trigger, Hudram left his companions to act on his own after his failed attempt at usurping control from his former leader. While attempting to harness the Eternity Core for his own ends, he is defeated by Ignis/Trigger Dark and killed once his remains are absorbed by Carmeara to assume Megalothor.

As Hudram is physically weak, he makes it up through his cunning wits and reliance on deception. In battle, he wields the arm blade Dagger Hudram (ダガーヒュドラム, Dagā Hyudoramu) on his right arm and releases the Hudrast (ヒュドラスト, Hyudorasuto) from the weapon.

Hudram is voiced by Ryosuke Takahashi (高橋 良輔, Takahashi Ryōsuke), who previously voiced Samurai・Calibur from SSSS.Gridman. He is the reinterpretation of Hudra from Ultraman Tiga: The Final Odyssey.

=== The Kingdom ===
The Kingdom (ザ・キングダム, Za Kingudamu) is an organization that first appeared in Ultra Galaxy Fight: The Absolute Conspiracy. Parallel to the residents of the Land of Light, the Absolutians (アブソリューティアン, Abusoryūtian) race are aliens native to their central planet, who evolved into their current gold-colored form after being exposed to the Cascade Rays (カスケード光線, Kasukēdo Kōsen). Despite the energy's massive strength, their inability to control it leads to a slow destruction of their home world, hence their necessity to take the Land of Light as their replacement planet and eventually leading to their upcoming war with the latter planet's Ultras. After losing Yullian as their hostage and suffering from a massive lost during both parties' fight on Planet Blizzard, The Kingdom temporarily ceases their war against the Land of Light and resort to covert operations.

The Absolutian race in general has their body property consist of Absolute Particles (アブソリュート粒子, Abusoryūto Ryūshi), which gives off high energy readings within the vicinity of their presence.

==== Absolute Tartarus ====
First appearing in The Absolute Conspiracy, Ultimate Life Form Absolute Tartarus (究極生命体 アブソリュートタルタロス, Kyūkyoku Seimei-tai Abusoryūto Tarutarosu) is The Kingdom's strategist who has the ability to use the dimensional pocket Narak as his means of transportation. As the de jure leader of the team, Tartarus answers to an unseen ruler, who the Absolutians refer to as their lord.

Exactly after the events The Absolute Conspiracy, Tartarus continues to strengthen The Kingdom's forces while crippling any threats that may pose as potential allies to the Ultras. After failing to prevent the Ultras from rescuing Yullian and losing a majority of his forces, he attempts to obliterate the Ultras along with his leading forces on Planet Blizzard, but the intervention of Ultraman King caused him, Diavolo and Ribut to be dragged into a black hole to the world where events of Ultraman Trigger is taking place. Tartarus initially hatched a plan to acquire the Eternity Core's power for The Kingdom's use, but Diavolo's defeat and Ribut's meddling forced him to abandon the idea and resuming his war with the Ultras.

Junichi Suwabe (諏訪部 順一, Suwabe Jun'ichi) and Walter Roberts reprise their voice role as Absolute Tartarus in Japanese and English dub respectively.

==== Absolute Diavolo ====
Ultimate Life Form Absolute Diavolo (究極生命体 アブソリュートディアボロ, Kyūkyoku Seimei-tai Abusoryūto Diaboro) is a member of the Absolutian race who is trained in the ways of Cosmo Beast Style, particularly Alude's techniques. To obtain the knowledge of said martial art, Diavolo collaborates with the Magma Invasion Army and assumed the identity of martial artist Dias (ディアス, Diasu) to slip in as a fellow student to Regulos. By the time the Magma Invasion Army invades Planet D60, Diavolo shows his true colors and kills Alude and Spica. He also torments the captured Regulos out of spite.

When a convoy of Ultras storm the Absolutians' home planet and freed their captives, Diavolo fought against Regulos and is defeated when the Ultra and the Leo Brothers combine the powers of Cosmo Beast Style against the former. Diavolo's heart was later dragged alongside Tartarus and Ribut into a black hole and transported to the world where events of Ultraman Trigger taking place. Intending to fulfill Tartarus' plan in harnessing the Eternity Core, a resurrected Diavolo fought and almost succeeded by draining it from Glitter Trigger Eternity before Ribut interfered in the former's operation. His energies were stolen by GUTS-Select to activate Nursedessei's Battle Mode and was defeated again by the former team and both Ultras' combined attacks. Tartarus revived him once more, forcing The Kingdom to abandon their operation on Earth.

Being an Absolutian, Diavolo has the same powerset and as strong as Tartarus. As a practitioner of Cosmo Beast Style, with his finishing move being the Juggernaut Charging Buffalo Strike (剛力破牛拳, Gōriki Hagyū-ken). Upon destruction, Diavolo can regenerate himself for as long as his Absolute Heart (アブソリュートハート, Abusoryūto Hāto) remains intact.

Absolute Diavolo is voiced by Teruaki Ogawa (小川 輝晃, Ogawa Teruaki) in Japanese, and by Dennis Falt in English respectively. As Dias, Diavolo is voiced by Akira Ishida (石田 彰, Ishida Akira) in Japanese, and by Michael Rhys in English respectively.

==== Absolute Titan ====
Ultimate Life Form Absolute Titan (究極生命体 アブソリュートティターン, Kyūkyoku Seimei-tai Abusoryūto Titān) is an Absolutian swordsman and a cold-hearted assassin whose philosophy as an honored warrior often puts him at odds with Diavolo.

After Gina Spectre's death, Tartarus assigned Titan to Planet Babel (惑星バベル, Wakusei Baberu) to find and destroy Ultraman Noa, but a commotion with the Ultra Force led to his encounter with Ultraman Ribut, wherein both warriors earned each other's mutual respect. Despite Noa's conviction for the Ultras and Absolutians to form a truce, a rhetoric that is repeated in his confrontation with Ribut on Planet Blizzard, Titan rejected it under The Kingdom's need for his race to survive and postponing their fight out of frustration.

Absolute Titan is voiced by Hiroki Yasumoto (安元 洋貴, Yasumoto Hiroki) in Japanese. In the English dub, he is voiced by Bob Werley in prologue and Douglas Kirk in subsequent episodes.

==== Servants of The Kingdom ====
- Strange Mechanical Monster Darebolic (奇機械怪獣 デアボリック, Ki Kikai Kaijū Deaborikku; 14): A monster from Ultraman Orb The Movie, which Tartarus acquired and modified by Alien Bat for The Kingdom's usage. In episode 14 of Trigger, it was used by Diavolo to force the titular Ultra into harnessing the Eternity Core's power. The monster was bisected by Glitter Trigger Eternity's Eternity Zerades.
- SC-4 Ultroid Zero (特空機4号 ウルトロイドゼロ, Tokkū-ki Yon-gō Urutoroido Zero): GAFJ's fourth SC unit, which Tartarus acquired alongside Darebolic and modified by Alien Bat into an autonomous combatant. The SC unit was utilized by Tartarus on Planet Babel to fight against Nexus and destroyed by Ultraman Noa's Lightning Noa. First appeared in episode 22 of Ultraman Z.
- Ghost Sorcerer Reibatos (亡霊魔道士 レイバトス, Bōrei Madō-shi Reibatosu): The major antagonist of Ultra Fight Orb. Arriving in the Monster Graveyard, he empowers himself with four Devil Splinters that allows him to recreate the Giga Battlenizer, but later on dies from the feedback. His remains were collected by Alien Zarab during the events of Ultraman Regulos: The First Mission and reconstituted in Planet Maijii to be used as a vessel for Alien Reiblood before it was destroyed by the Ultras. His voice role is reprised by Holly Kaneko (金子 はりい, Kaneko Harii).
- Ultraman Belial (ウルトラマンベリアル, Urutoraman Beriaru): See here.
- Ultraman Tregear (ウルトラマントレギア, Urutoraman Toregia): See here.
- Antenna Alien Alien Bat (触覚宇宙人 バット星人, Shokkaku Uchūjin Batto Seijin): The resurrected villain from the events of Ultraman Saga under the service of The Kingdom, modifying Darebolic and Ultroid Zero for their personal usage. During Tartarus' hunt for the Devil Splinters, he arrived in the Monster Graveyard and created Grigio Darkness from his study of Ultra Dark-Killer. He participated in the fight against New Generation Heroes and is killed by Ultraman Taiga Tri-Strium Rainbow. His voice role is reprised by Munetoshi Takubo (田久保 宗稔, Takubo Munetoshi).
- Phantom Space Queen Gina Spectre (幻影宇宙女王 ギナ・スペクター, Gen'ei Uchū Joō Gina Supekutā): A leader of the Gua Army who lost her life when the army collapsed after her brothers, Juda and Mold, were kidnapped during the events of The Absolute Conspiracy. In The Destined Crossroad, she was resurrected by Reibatos and seeks to revive her fallen brothers, joining The Kingdom through a deal with Tartarus. Gina assisted them in retrieving the Devil Splinters, but is later forced by Reibatos to fuse with the spirits of her brothers into Gua Spectre. After Gua's defeat, Gina disappears as her revival is approaching its limit, nonetheless thanking Grigio for their encounter. She is voiced by Ayaka Nanase (七瀬 彩夏, Nanase Ayaka) in Japanese, while Soness Stevens voices her in the English dub. Previously appearing as a human form in episodes 10-12 of Ultraman X, The Destined Crossroad is Gina Spectre's first appearance in her true form.
  - Phantom Composite Figure Great Devil Emperor Gua Spectre (幻影合身大魔帝 グア・スペクター, Gen'ei Gasshin Daimatei Gua Supekutā): The combined form of the three Gua siblings, which Reibatos created by infusing the spirits of Mold and Juda into Gina against her will. The fusion is defeated by Ultraman Reiga's Reiga Ultimate Blaster, reducing it to Gina before her passing to the afterlife. Instead of appearing similar to Mold Spectre from episode 15 of Ultraman X, Gua Spectre appeared as a white version of the former with Juda and Gina's faces as shoulder armors.
- Ultrawoman Grigio Darkness (ウルトラウーマングリージョダークネス, Urutoraūman Gurījo Dākunesu): A Darkness Warrior created by Alien Bat by fusing Grigio's stolen light energy with the Killer Plasma, through his study of Ultra Dark-Killer's ability to do so in the past. Grigio Darkness fought against her counterpart, followed by Ultraman Nice, Zearth and Boy as the three distracted her to lift the original Grigio's spirit. Grigio Darkness was killed in a futile attempt to fire her Dark Grigio Shot (ダークグリージョショット, Dāku Gurījo Shotto) against Grigio's Grigio Shot. First appearing in Ultra Heroes Expo 2021 stage show, her voice role is reprised by Arisa Sonohara in a dual role with the real Grigio.
- Fighting Bem Mecha Baltan (ファイティング・ベム メカバルタン, Faitingu Bemu Meka Barutan): A cyborg Alien Baltan under Gua Army's employment from Andro Melos. Gua Spectre summoned it alongside Cyber Mecha Baltan to fight off Ultraman Z and was killed by the Beliarok's Deathcium Slash.
- Cyber Mecha Baltan (サイバーメカバルタン, Saibā Meka Barutan): An enhanced version of Mecha Baltan from the events of Ultraman Festival 2016. Gua Spectre summoned it alongside Mecha Baltan to fight off Ultraman Z and was killed by the Beliarok's Deathcium Slash.

=== Megalothor ===
Evil God Megalothor (邪神 メガロゾーア, Jashin Megarozōa) is Carmeara's monster form in Ultraman Trigger: New Generation Tiga that she created by absorbing her comrades' essence and tapping into the Eternity Core's power in the process. In its initial fight with both Trigger and Trigger Dark, Megalothor absorbed their attacks to empower itself, eventually evolving to its second form within three days. Guided by Carmeara's resentment towards Kengo/Trigger, Megalothor chases after him in Nursedessei and eventually defeated when Kengo transforms into Trigger Truth to tap into the power of Eternity Core. A decade later in Ultraman Decker, remnants of Megalothor's darkness merged with the Spheres to resurrect itself, subverting their will and resumes its rampaging spree by fighting Decker and the returned Trigger. With Carmeara purged out of the monster, Megalothor is rendered its own entity and is destroyed by the Ultras' combined forces.

Throughout its appearance, Megalothor changes forms through its ability of absorption:

- First Form (第一形態, Dai Ichi Keitai; 23, 24 (Trigger)): Megalothor's default form, resembling Demonthor from Ultraman Tiga: The Final Odyssey.
- Second Form (第二形態, Dai Ni Keitai; 24, 25 (Trigger)): Megalothor's evolved form, resulted from absorbing Glitter Trigger Eternity and Trigger Dark's Zeperion Beams. In addition to resembling Gatanothor from Ultraman Tiga, gains the ability to utilize Dark Megalo Tentacles (ダークメガロテンタクルズ, Dāku Megaro Tentakuruzu), Dark Megalo Thunder (ダークメガロサンダー, Dāku Megaro Sandā) and Dark Megalo Image (ダークメガロイメージ, Dāku Megaro Imēji).
- Evil God Sphere Megalothor (Second Form) (邪神 スフィアメガロゾーア (第二形態), Jashin Sufia Megarozōa (Dai Ni Keitai); 7, 8 (Decker)): Megalothor's resurrected form, obtained through its assimilation with the Spheres while at the same time subverting their will to become independent. It retains most of its original attacks while gaining the Spheres' ability to emit shockwave and creating barrier.

=== Rylar ===
Rylar (ライラー, Rairā) is a cult that worships the Ultra Ancient Civilization and the antagonist faction of Ultraman Trigger: Episode Z. Preaching the concept of light itself, they desire said power in order to reshape the world to their own image and has intruded multiple ancient ruins after sensing Kengo's plight. Initially cooperating with GUTS-Select to revive Kengo, they later allied with Celebro to steal the powers of Ultraman Trigger for Zabil to become Evil Trigger. Aside from Rylar Ibra, the rest of the cultists were killed after being absorbed by Zabil to facilitate the Evil Trigger transformation.

==== Zabil/Evil Trigger ====
Zabil (ザビル, Zabiru) is the true leader of Rylar and the main antagonist of Episode Z. Hailing from 30 million years prior during the Giants of Darkness' invasion on Earth, Zabil was once a member of the Terran Protection Team who fought alongside Yuzare as the team's scientist in against their invaders. When Yuzare sacrificed herself to empower the recently defected Ultraman Trigger, he fell into despair after assuming that all of his comrades' sacrifice were in vain. Anticipating the return of the dark giants, Zabil set up a string of events that leads to the entirety of Ultraman Trigger: New Generation Tiga by slipping into the ranks of TPU as Ryuichi Tokioka (トキオカ リュウイチ, Tokioka Ryūichi) and establishes himself as Mitsukuni's right hand man, acting as a researcher of the Ultra Ancient era while guiding Akito into researching the GUTS Sparklence technology. He and his cultists also witnessed the exploits of Kengo/Trigger and the latter's sacrifice to stabilize the Eternity Core.

Within the intervening two years, he replaces Tatsumi as GUTS-Select's new captain to fight against the increasing number of monster attacks. Once Kengo has been revived and lost his powers as Trigger, Zabil drops the ruse and has his cultists facilitate his transformation into Evil Trigger, intending to use his newfound powers in leading mankind and ensuring peace with his own terms. The destruction of Evil Trigger resulted with Zabil spending his last breath seeing Yuzare's image in Yuna before passing on to the afterlife.

Zabil transforms into Evil Trigger (イーヴィルトリガー, Īviru Torigā), a white-colored artificial Ultraman in Trigger's image, through the Ancient Sparklence and his fellow cultists as sacrifices with the original Trigger's powers as a conduit. Other than his finisher being Evil Shoot (イーヴィルシュート, Īviru Shūto), Evil Trigger can utilize Evil Giganzer (イーヴィルジャイガンザー, Īviru Jaiganzā) to grow into gigantic proportions by absorbing Ultraman Trigger's powers.

Zabil is portrayed by Yūichi Nakamura (中村 優一, Nakamura Yūichi). Evil Trigger is based on Evil Tiga from Ultraman Tiga.

==== Rylar Ibra ====
Rylar Ibra (ライラー イブラ, Rairā Ibura) is the acting figurehead of Rylar during Zabil's infiltration into TPU and is one of Celebro's willing host. He owns a capsule which serves as a beacon to manipulate monsters into his liking, as in with Pagos, Gazort, Deathdrago and Genegarg. After leading the cultists into assisting GUTS-Select in saving Kengo from the Eternity Core, Ibra escaped from his captivity and helps with collecting the scattered powers of Ultraman Trigger's Hyper Key under Zabil's orders. Ibra was spared from being a sacrifice, but was forced to be used by Celebro as its medium in summoning Destrudos to assist Zabil/Evil Trigger in against the Ultras. Following Destrudos' destruction and Celebro's recapture, Ibra's fate remains unknown.

Rylar Ibra is portrayed by Akinori Ando (安藤 彰則, Andō Akinori).

=== Celebro/Destrudos ===
Parasitic Life Form Celebro (寄生生物 セレブロ, Kisei Seibutsu Sereburo) is an alien creature and the antagonist of Ultraman Z who escaped from STORAGE's captivity at some point of time. Arriving in Kengo's Earth, Celebro joins the Rylar cult as part of restarting the Civilization Self-Destruction Game (文明自滅ゲーム, Bunmei Jimetsu Gēmu). Initially jumping from one cultist to another, Celebro then possesses Haruki and took control of Ultraman Z to fight against GUTS-Select and Ignis/Trigger Dark. In the middle of supporting Zabil/Evil Trigger, Kengo manages to help Haruki in expelling the alien parasite, forcing it to inhabit Ibra to transform into Destrudos until it was defeated by the three Ultras. Celebro was later recaptured by Himari, allowing Haruki to return the creature to STORAGE in his home world.

While possessing Rylar Ibra, Celebro transforms into the Annihilation Armor Monster Destrudos (殲滅機甲獣 デストルドス, Senmetsu Kikō-jū Desutorudosu), a monster from episode 24 of Ultraman Z through the use of its corresponding Monster Medal.

=== Sphere ===
Space Floating Object Spheres (宇宙浮遊物体 スフィア, Uchū Fuyū Buttai Sufia) are the antagonist of Ultraman Decker, who previously appeared in Ultraman Dyna. The Spheres were originally creatures from the distant future who seek to assimilate lifeforms on planets with advanced civilizations. Their method of assimilation involves scouts forming a Sphere Barrier (スフィアバリア, Sufia Baria) around a targeted planet, enhancing the barrier by absorbing the planet's energy before Mother Sphere arrives to complete the process. Their presence triggers an alliance between mankind and various alien civilizations to fight back, some of which include the future Yuzare, people of Planet Bazdor, Ultraman Decker and Ultraman Dyna. When Agams defected to the Spheres and time travels to the past, the Spheres follow him in-suit to the Earth 7 years after Episode Z. After isolating Earth from rest of the solar system. the Sphere attempt to and siphon Earth's energy to gradually consume the planet.

With Agams/Terraphaser's cooperation, the Spheres achieved their objective and thus summoning Mother Spheresaurus to Earth in harnessing the power of Eternity Core for its own use. The Spheres are later destroyed when Mother Spheresaurus is killed by Ultraman Decker, freeing any planet under their grasp (both the present day and the future).

- Giant Space Orb King Sphere (巨大宇宙球体 キングスフィア, Kyodai Uchū Kyūtai Kingu Sufia): A twin-conjoined saucer-like form which act as carriers of the smaller Sphere fleet. Five of them are deployed to different countries across the globe to form the Sphere Barrier during their first invasion on Earth.
- Dynamic Space Orb Sphere Soldier (精強宇宙球体 スフィアソルジャー, Seikyō Uchū Kyūtai Sufia Sorujā): Lesser versions of the Spheres, deployed as invasion troops and can infect monsters to create Sphere Synthetic Monsters. A Mons Dimension Card of the Sphere Soldiers is under Kengo's possession, which Akito enhances to grant Trigger the ability to pass through the Sphere Barrier.
- Dynamic Fusion Monster Spheresaurus (精強融合獣 スフィアザウルス, Seikyō Yūgō-jū Sufiazaurusu; 1, 14, 15, 21): A monster that an aggregated form of the Sphere Soldiers, its purpose to absorb an invaded world's energy to empower the Sphere Barrier until it shrinks to the point where the Spheres are able to assimilate the planet before Mother Spheresaurus appears. The first Spheresaurus forms in Sorafune City where it unleashes an EMP shockwave that disables autopiloted GUTS Falcon and Nursedessei, only to be destroyed by Decker's Selgend Beam. A year later, another Spheresaurus is created with Sphere-Neomegas's regenerative abilities to enhancing the Sphere Barrier with support from Agams/Terraphaser before being swiftly destroyed by Decker after the Ultra acquires Dynamic Type. Spheresaurus were last seen during Sphere-Geomos' reign of terror, as they arrived from the future to reinforce the Sphere Barrier. The first one was killed by Nursedessei's S-Plasma-enhanced Nurse Cannon, while the second breed was killed by Ultraman Dyna upon arrival.
- Sphere Obelisk (スフィアオベリスク, Sufia Oberisuku): A trio of giant pillars formed by the Sphere Soldiers to drain the Earth of its energy and redirect it to empower the Sphere Barrier. Upon empowerment by the Sphere Soldiers, Terraphaser creates them to call forth Mother Spheresaurus while at the same time resurrecting Sphere-Gomora, Sphere-Red King and Sphere-Neomegas as guardians against Ultraman Decker's assault.

==== Mother Sphere ====
Mother Sphere (マザースフィア, Mazā Sufia; 23-25) is the queen of the Spheres who is also their main body and exists by transcending time and space. Due to her nature, the Mother Sphere rarely acts on her own and is called forth to fully assimilate a planet that is under the Sphere's grasp as Strongest Sphere Monster Mother Spheresaurus (最強スフィア獣 マザースフィアザウルス, Saikyō Sufia-jū Mazā Sufiazaurusu). When Agams facilitate the Sphere invasion in the present day Earth and assists the Sphere Soldiers' attempt at enhancing the barrier surrounding the planet, Mother Sphere appears and contemplates to absorb the Eternity Core for herself. Having killed Agams when he tried to redeem himself, she fights against the combined forces of the Ultras and GUTS-Select and briefly assimilating them into her own being. However her targets escape after refusing to discard their free will, targeting her energy core for Decker to deliver the finishing blow. With Mother Spheresaurus' death, the Spheres ceased to exist.

As Mother Spheresaurus, her main ability is to fire an energy beam from the core on its chest and using the crystals on her body to fire multitudes of light beams. Her ability to transcends time and space allows her to traverse between different periods of time and accessing the Eternity Core despite its entrance was sealed prior to the series.

Mother Spheresaurus is voiced by Sayaka Ohara (大原 さやか, Ōhara Sayaka).

=== Agams the Bazdor ===
Agams the Bazdor (バズド星人 アガムス, Bazudo Seijin Agamusu; Alien Bazdo "Agams") is an alien who poses as the scientist named Yuichiro Asakage (アサカゲ ユウイチロウ, Asakage Yūichirō) from TPU's technology division and is a supporting antagonist in Ultraman Decker.

From Planet Bazdo (バズド星, Bazudo-sei), Agams and his people are one of the many resistance forces who fought against the invading Spheres, but after losing his wife Laelia and seeing his planet doomed to be assimilated, Agams came to the conclusion that the creatures' attack on civilized planets are inevitable, coupled with blaming mankind for all the mess that happened and Decker in particular. To that end, he time travels to the farthest in Earth's past and works under TPU to create Terraphaser. As "Asakage", Agams develops new armaments for them and regularly comes to Nursedessei to deliver said items, as well as guiding them in the use of their mechs during battle. In the midst of GUTS-Select's subsequent battles, Agams launches the DG Plan (DG計画, Dī Jī Keikaku) to create Terraphaser as part of strengthening TPU and GUTS-Select's assets, but in truth aims to use the robot as part of his plan in assisting the Spheres to consume Planet Earth. Agams' ambition is put to a temporary stop when Kanata wields the power of Decker Dynamic Type and destroys both Spheresaurus and Terraphaser, leaving Agams on the run from TPU authorities. After helping the Spheres reaching their objective, Agams eventually redeem himself when Kanata reminds him of Laelia's wish, with her spirit visiting him as well. Having freed the Earth from the Sphere Barrier, Agams dies when Mother Spheresaurus opens fire on Terraphaser's cockpit. He was last seen with Laelia's spirit, watching Kanata after his success in repelling the Sphere invasion before the couple passes on to the afterlife.

Agams' weapon is the Phase Riser (フェイズライザー, Feizu Raizā), a device which allows him to disable Terraphaser remotely and acts as his control device when piloting the robot. It also allows him to access the Mons Dimension Cards as part of strengthening the robot.

Agams is portrayed by Yu Koyanagi (小柳 友, Koyanagi Yū), who previously portrays Run in Ultraman Zero: The Revenge of Belial.

=== Professor Gibellus ===
Alien Zozogiga Professor Gibellus (ゾゾギガ星人 プロフェッサー・ギベルス, Zozogiga Seijin Purofessā Giberusu) is the main antagonist of Ultraman Decker Finale: Journey to Beyond. Piloting the experimental site/mobile fortress Space Experiment Fortress Zorgaus (実験要塞艇 ゾルガウス, Jikken Yōsai-tei Zorugausu) with an alien army under his lead, Gibellus aims to rule the skies over Earth while finding himself opposed by GUTS-Select and Dinas. In his Gigalogaiser form, he was killed by Ultraman Decker.

Professor Gibellus can transform into Galactic Empire Beast Gigalogaiser (銀河皇獣 ギガロガイザ, Ginga Kōjū Gigarogaiza) that can also combine with Zorgaus to become Galactic Fortress Beast Zor-Gigalogaiser (銀河要塞獣ゾルギガロガイザ, Ginga Yōsai-jū Zoru Gigarogaiza).

Professor Gibellus is voiced by Ryūsei Nakao (中尾 隆聖, Nakao Ryūsei).

=== Magma Invasion Army ===
Magma Invasion Army (マグマ星人侵略軍, Maguma Seijin Shinryaku-gun) are an army of Alien Magma who serves as antagonists to Ultraman Regulos. The army launched their attack on Planets L77 and D60, setting forth the events of Ultraman Leo and contributing to Regulos' capture in Ultra Galaxy Fight: The Destined Crossroad.

==== Volcan ====
Volcan, the Magma Invasion Army Admiral (マグマ侵略軍提督 ヴォルカン, Maguma Shinryaku-gun Teitoku Vorukan) is the commander that leads the Magma Invasion Army in against Planets L77 and D60. He was killed by Regulos, but before his death, he knew Regulos who came from unidentified planet.

Volcan has the ability to turn his malice into poison, attacking enemies with his Magma Poison Hand Strike (マグマ毒手拳, Maguma Dokushu-ken). He also wears an armor which was copied from Alien Empera's Armored Darkness, granting him protection despite being inferior to the original model.

Volcan is voiced by Takaya Kuroda (黒田 崇矢, Kuroda Takaya) in Japanese, who previously voiced an Alien Magma in Ultraman Taiga, and by Douglas Kirk in English respectively.

==== Yurub ====
Yurub of the Inferno Magma Siblings (マグマ地獄兄妹 ユラブ, Maguma Jigoku Kyōdai Yurabu) is the captain of the Magma Invasion Army that attacks Planet D60, setting his forces against the Cosmo Beast Fighters. Other than participating in the front lines, Yurub's cruelty in the battlefield is tempered by his compassion to his younger sister. He was killed by Instructor Phoros.

Yurub is voiced by Koichi Toshima in Japanese, who previously portrayed an Alien Magma in Secret Origins of the Nursedessei, and by Eric Kelso in English respectively.

==== Lava ====
Lava of the Inferno Magma Siblings (マグマ地獄兄妹 ラバ, Maguma Jigoku Kyōdai Raba) is the vice-captain of the Magma Invasion Army, as well as Yurub's subordinate and his younger sister. She fights using a pair of short swords and her speed to create combo attacks. She was killed by Tubahn.

Lava is voiced by Meiku Harukawa in Japanese, and by Hannah Grace in English respectively.

=== Alien Reiblood ===
Ultimate Lifeform Alien Reiblood (究極生命体 レイブラッド星人, Kyūkyoku Seimei-tai Reiburaddo Seijin) is the main antagonist of Ultraman Regulos: First Mission and first appeared in Ultra Galaxy Mega Monster Battle. Purged from Belial's mental body in Ultraman Geed, Alien Reiblood's spirit encountered Tartarus and became a Parallel Isotope before obtaining the body of Reibatos through Alien Zarab's help. His Reibatos body was destroyed by Regulos, Ribut, Powered, Great, and the Ultra Force and he was forced to withdraw.

Alien Reiblood is voiced by Holly Kaneko in Japanese and by Jeff Manning in English respectively.

== Minor characters ==
Ultraman Trigger

- Reina Manaka (マナカ レイナ, Manaka Reina): The 49 year old worker of Sizuma Foundation who is the leading archaeologist in exploring Trigger's resting place on Mars. 20 years prior to the series, Reina discovered an infant Kengo nearby Trigger's statue and adopted the boy as her own son, having well aware of his true nature prior to the ancient Ultra's resurrection. She is portrayed by Megumi Yokoyama (横山 めぐみ, Yokoyama Megumi).
- Yoko Nakashima (ナカシマ ヨウコ, Nakashima Yōko; 7): STORAGE's ace pilot, who boarded the Space Sevenger in an attempt to assist Ultraman Z in recovering King Joe SC from Alien Barossa IV. Rima Matsuda (松田 リマ, Matsuda Rima) reprises her voice role as Yoko Nakashima.
- Yurika Shizuma (シズマ ユリカ, Shizuma Yurika; 9): Mitsukuni's wife and Yuna's mother, who was also a descendant of Yuzare's bloodline. Yurika was the person who guided young Mitsukuni during his arrival from the Neo Frontier universe and helped familiarizing him with the universe he was stranded in. Yurika died at some point after Yuna's birth, leaving Mitsukuni to raise and protect their daughter in the former's absence. She is portrayed by Rina Aizawa (逢沢 りな, Aizawa Rina).

Secret Origins of the Nursedessei

- Michiru Hotta (ホッタ ミチル, Hotta Michiru; 16, 25): Hotta's wife and a full-time housewife. A former TPU ace pilot, she is occasionally brought in as a temporary instructor. She recommended that Tatsumi recruits Himari into GUTS-Select. She is portrayed by Mio Makita (牧田 未央, Makita Mio).

Ultraman Decker

- Daishiro Asumi (アスミ ダイシロウ, Asumi Daishirō; 1, 25): Kanata's grandfather, who gave the former his blessing to join TPU after the events of Sphere's invasion. He is portrayed by Ikko Suzuki (鈴木 一功, Suzuki Ikkō).
- Shiro Asumi (アスミ シロウ, Asumi Shirō; 2, 19) and Tokiko Asumi (アスミ トキコ, Asumi Tokiko; 2, 19): Kanata's parents, who went to Mars around the same time when the Sphere invasion took place, forcing them to be separated from Kanata and Daishiro. While taking refuge under the former GUTS-Select members' protection, Kengo took the time to reveal the Asumi couple of their son's exploits on Earth and the two agree to deliver a recorded message to their, congratulating him on his participation as a GUTS-Select member. Shiro and Tokiko are portrayed by Asao Onuma (小沼 朝生, Onuma Asao) and Miyuki Natsume (夏目 実幸, Natsume Miyuki) respectively.
- Maki Shigenaga (シゲナガ マキ, Shigenaga Maki; 10): Kaizaki's mentor and a former chief of TPU's Monster Research Lab. Having discovered the buried remains of a monster, Shigenaga plans to create Neomegas as an alternative to the Ultras, but was fired from her position in TPU after Kaizaki discovered her plans. Up until the present day, Shigenaga works with underground sponsors to create Neomegas and was arrested after her monster's destruction. She is portrayed by Mami Nomura (野村 真美, Nomura Mami).
- Decker Asumi (デッカー・アスミ, Dekkā Asumi; 14, 15): The descendant of Kanata who joins the fight against the Sphere forces as Ultraman Decker. However as a result of Agams' time travel machinations threatening the future of Earth, Decker is forced to surrender his powers to Kanata, bidding his time until the time travel device is optimized enough to send his entire being to the past. He arrives too late as Agams had already created Terrapahaser, but is able to support his ancestor and returns to his timeline once he can entrust Kanata with both Decker's powers and the fate of Earth. He is portrayed by Masashi Taniguchi (谷口 賢志, Taniguchi Masashi).
- Nagi Urasawa (浦澤 ナギ, Urasawa Nagi; 20): A local historian and the last remaining Ragonite (羅権衆, Ragon-shū), a tribe that worships Ragon as their protector. 70 years prior to the series, the young Urasawa played with Ragon and was forced to part ways with the monster when it returned to its original dimension. While taking the job as a historian and trying to keep Ragon's legacy alive, she disguises herself as the monster to scare away developers who try to destroy the Ama's Arch in Mount Uzume. When the real Ragon rampages out of anger for being forgotten, Urasawa quells the monster and prepares to join Ragon in its departure, but Ichika and Ultraman Decker stop her before the portal closes. In the aftermath, she has made peace with Ragon's departure and gives Ichika the seashell from said monster as a parting gift. She is portrayed by Noriko Tatsu (竜 のり子, Tatsu Noriko). As a child, she is portrayed by Akari Noda (野田 あかり, Noda Akari).
- Yuji Hiyama (ヒヤマ ユウジ, Hiyama Yūji; 21): The chairman of Scitech Laboratory Holdings. Having acquired a Sphere Soldier specimen, he aims to benefit the S-Plasma essence from the creature as a form of a renewable energy source, but the experiment resulted with said creature resurrecting itself and assimilating with the entire facility into Sphere-Geomos. He is portrayed by Shohei Abe (阿部 翔平, Abe Shōhei), who previously portrayed Shingo Kuwabara in Ultraman Ginga.

== Monsters and aliens ==
=== Ultraman Trigger: New Generation Tiga ===
Dark Monsters

The Dark Monsters (闇怪獣, Yami Kaijū) are creatures manipulated by the Giants of Darkness in their attack against humanity.

- Ultra-Ancient Dark Monster Golba (超古代闇怪獣 ゴルバー, Chō Kodai Yami Kaijū Gorubā; 1): An ancient monster that appears as a hybrid of Golza and Melba from episode 1 of Ultraman Tiga. It was manipulated by Carmeara to attack the Martian colony and the underground pyramid where Trigger's petrified form was put to rest, but Kengo merged with the statue to bring Trigger back to life. The newly awakened Trigger fought the combined forces of Carmeara and Golba, resulting in the death of the latter monster when it was used as a meat shield against Zeperion Beam.
  - Ultra-Ancient Dark Monster Golba II (超古代闇怪獣 ゴルバーII, Chō Kodai Yami Kaijū Gorubā Tsū; 18): An improved variant of the original Golba. It was launched after the entire GUTS-Select was put under the Morpheus D trance and manipulated by Kyriel to test their worth as potential saviors. Golba II was killed by Glitter Trigger Eternity's Eternity Banish.
- Transformation Monster Gazort (変形怪獣 ガゾート, Henkei Kaijū Gazōto; Movie): A monster that swallowed the Trigger Sky Type Hyper Key and was manipulated by Rylar into fighting against Trigger, who later on destroyed it after reclaiming said power for his own use. First appeared in episode 6 of Ultraman Tiga.
  - Transformation Dark Monster Gazort (変形闇怪獣 ガゾート, Henkei Yami Kaijū Gazōto; 3): A corrupted version of Gazort that Hudram forced into being by merging countless Clitters (クリッター, Kurittā) with his dark tornado, using it to draw out Yuzare's sprit. It was killed by Ultraman Trigger Sky Type's Runboldt Arrow Strike.
- Destructive Rampage Dragon Deathdrago (破壊暴竜 デスドラゴ, Hakai Bōryū Desudorago; 5, Movie): The first monster that mankind encountered six years prior to Ultraman Trigger, hence the nickname the first monster (始まりの怪獣, Hajimari no Kaijū). During Deathdrago's first appearance, it fought against the GUTS Wing piloted by Mitsukuni Shizuma, forcing it to retreat but not without killing Akito's parents. Its presence convinced the worldwide governments into joining forces with Sizuma Foundation and forming TPU, as well as GUTS-Select. In the present day, Deathdrago appeared to resume its rampaging spree, only to be forced to retreat underground once it was overpowered by Trigger. Its horns can be used to unleash electrical discharges. In Episode Z, another Deathdrago was manipulated by Rylar to fight against Ultraman Trigger and Z.
  - Destructive Dark Rampage Dragon Deathdrago (破壊闇暴竜 デスドラゴ, Hakai Yami Bōryū Desudorago; 5): While recuperating from its injuries underground, Carmeara empowered Deathdrago into a Dark Monster, gaining enhanced electrical attacks at the cost of its own free will. The monster resurfaced and fought against Trigger while Darrgon was targeting Yuna. It was killed by Trigger Sky Type's Runboldt Arrow Strike.
- Petrification Dark Evil Monster Gargorgon (石化闇魔獣 ガーゴルゴン, Sekika Yami Majū Gāgorugon; 9): One of the many monsters that rampaged on Earth during the Ultra-Ancient Civilization era. It was petrified into a stone statue after being deflected with its own petrifying beam by Yuzare, until its old master reawaken her in the present day to target Yuna. With the help of Mitsukuni in GUTS Wing, the monster's main eye was injured for Trigger to bisect it with his Multi Sword. Gargorgon's data was later saved into a Monster Key that GUTS-Select uses to petrify Metsu-Orochi at the cost of Nursedessei's Maxima Nurse Cannon. First appeared in episode 6 of Ultraman X.

Others

- Vampire Monster Gymaira (吸血怪獣 ギマイラ, Kyūketsu Kaijū Gimaira; 2): A space monster that had been on Earth at an unspecified point of time. It emerged from the sea where GUTS Falcon fought against it and was killed by Trigger after he pins the monster to the ground and firing Zeperion Beam at point blank. First appeared in episode 17 of Ultraman 80.
- Ancient Underground Beast Oka-Gubila (古代地底獣 オカグビラ, Kodai Chitei-jū Okagubira; 4): An underground variant of Gubila from episode 24 of Ultraman, the monster having adapted from its usual aquatic environment to evolve into an underground monster. Oka-Gubila surfaces after Ignis stole an ancient artifact which acted as a beacon for the monster, chasing the alien until he dropped the device. As Trigger fought the monster, Akito lured Oka-Gubila away from Yuna using the artifact, allowing Trigger to finish it with Delacium Claw Impact.
- Planetary Destruction God Satandelos (惑星破壊神 サタンデロス, Wakusei Hakai-shin Satanderosu; 6): A modified variant of Gigadelos from episode 14 of Ultraman Taiga. It was originally built by aliens for protection purposes, but the robot went berserk and assigned to Earth under Hudram's orders. With Ignis helped the team with disabling Satandelos' barrier generator, GUTS-Select was able to destroy the monster with Nursedessei's Nurse Cannon.
- Space Pirate Alien Barossa IV (海賊宇宙人 バロッサ星人 (四代目), Kaizoku Uchūjin Barossa Seijin (Yon-daime); 7): A space pirate who stole the King Joe SC from STORAGE, leading to a chase from Haruki/Z and Yoko/Space Sevenger. After using Bullton and ended up stranded in Kengo's Earth, he came across Ignis and was forced to grow large to reclaim the stolen Ultra Medals. He was killed by the combined forces of Ultraman Trigger and Z during his futile attempt to escape. He is voiced by Kiyotaka Taguchi (田口 清隆, Taguchi Kiyotaka), his race first appearing in episode 9 of Ultraman Z.
- Pirate Chick Monster Baby Zandrias "Kedamya" (海賊雛怪獣 ベビーザンドリアス ケダミャー, Kaizoku Hina Kaijū Bebī Zandoriasu Kedamyā; 7): Barossa IV's accomplice and his personal translator. During the alien's arrival to Kengo's Earth, Kedamya stole the Ultra Medals but loses it when Ignis return them to Haruki. After Barossa IV's defeat, Kedamya left Earth after picking a fight with the Lishurian. Voiced by Kaede Yuasa (湯浅 かえで, Yuasa Kaede), the infant creature first appearing in episode 1 of Ultraman Taiga.
- Four-Dimensional Monster Bullton (四次元怪獣 ブルトン, Yojigen Kaijū Buruton; 7): A space creature with the ability to manipulate dimensions. Barossa IV summoned Bullton to escape from his pursuers, only to ended up bringing Haruki/Z as well to Kengo's Earth. First appeared in episode 17 of Ultraman.
- SC (特空機, Tokkūki): A series of robots developed by STORAGE to fight against monsters in Ultraman Z.
  - SC-1M Space Sevenger (特空機1号改 宇宙セブンガー, Tokkūki Ichi-gō Kai Uchū Sebungā; 7): A modified version of STORAGE's Sevenger, used for the purpose of space travel. Yoko piloted the robot while chasing Barossa IV alongside Z, only to be separated as a result of Bullton. First appeared in episode 6 of Sevenger Fight.
  - SC-3 King Joe STORAGE Custom (特空機3号 キングジョー ストレイジカスタム, Tokkūki San-gō Kingu Jō Sutoreiji Kasutamu; 7, 8): A robot built through reverse engineering of a King Joe unit. It was stolen by Alien Barossa IV and ended up crashing on Kengo's Earth, where it remains there until the Dada (PDO-3) took over as part of their agenda to conquer Earth and fighting their opponents. After Dada PDO-3A possessed King Joe SC, it was scrapped by the combined powers of Trigger and Z, forcing the latter to salvage whatever remains of said robot left in hopes of fixing it once returned to STORAGE. First appeared in episode 11 of Ultraman Z.
- Three-Faced Phantom Dada (PDO-3) (三面怪人 ダダ (PDO-3), Sanmen Kaijin Dada (Pī Dī Ō Surī); 8): (Note: Also known as Powered Dada (パワードダダ, Pawādo Dada).) Digital offshoots (PDO-3A, PDO-3B, and PDO-3C) of the Dada alien race born from the latter's own DNA. They existed as computer lifeforms bent on conquering Earth through a global scale cyberattack. After failing to disable GUTS-Select through possessing their Nursedessei, the Dada hijacked King Joe SC as their support in against Trigger and Z. After the Nursedessei destroyed the Dada's nucleus, the cyber creature was killed in the destruction of King Joe SC by Trigger and Z. First appeared in episode 6 of Ultraman: The Ultimate Hero.
- Transformation Monster Zaragas (変身怪獣 ザラガス, Henshin Kaijū Zaragasu; 10): An underground monster that was slumbering beneath a city. It was awakened due to the effects of the Eternity Core and later the vibrations caused by Darrgon and fought against Trigger. Due to its adaptive ability, Nanase took Akito's advice to fire hydrogen missiles to halt the monster's cells for Trigger to finish it with Deracium Beam Torrent. First appeared in episode 36 of Ultraman.
- Space Dragon Nurse (宇宙竜 ナース, Uchū Ryū Nāsu; 15): Alien Wild's transportation saucer from the events of Secret Origins of the Nursedessei. As TPU fixed his ship during his stay on Earth, Alien Wild provided them with the schematics of Nurse, which allows Marluru and Akito to use it in order to design the Nursedessei. The data of Nurse was inscribed into a Monster Key for GUTS-Select to transform their ship into its Battle Mode. First appeared in episode 11 of Ultraseven.
- Legendary Galactic Infernal Beast Metsu-Orga (宇宙伝説魔獣 メツオーガ, Uchū Densetsu Majū Metsu Ōga; 16): A monster that is based on Woola of Ultraman Taiga, it was notorious for consuming and ravaged on countless astronomical objects before arriving on Earth. Due to its destructive nature, Hudram has no intention of using it to find the Eternity Core, but decided to unleash it to mankind to satiate his own twisted enjoyment. It was defeated by Nursedessei's Maxima Nurse Cannon after Trigger lift it up, but Metsu-Orga used the previously absorbed energies to evolve into Metsu-Orochi.
  - New Legendary Galactic Infernal Beast Metsu-Orochi (新宇宙伝説魔獣 メツオロチ, Shin Uchū Densetsu Majū Metsu Orochi; 16, 17): Metsu-Orga's later evolution, resembling Maga-Orochi of Ultraman Orb. With all means if weaponry failed, GUTS-Select was forced to temporarily petrify Orochi with Gargorgon's power at the cost of Nursedessei's Maxima Nurse Cannon. The next day, Ignis/Trigger Dark fought against the monster as Kengo in GUTS Falcon destroys Orochi's horn, stripping it of its absorption powers and allowing Glitter Trigger Eternity to finish it with Eternity Banish. Metsu-Orochi also appeared in a flashback in episode 17 of Ultraman Decker.
- Lishurians (17): Ignis' race of aliens from Planet Lishuria, most of them perished during Hudram's invasion on their planet, leaving the former as a sole survivor. From Ignis' flashback, his four Lishurian friends are portrayed by Yoshinori Matsubayashi (松林 慶知, Matsubayashi Yoshinori), Hiroshi Ito (伊藤 浩志, Itō Hiroshi), Chihisa Katoh (加藤 千尚, Katō Chihisa), and Nanae Nishitani (西谷 菜々恵, Nishitani Nanae).
- Poison Flame Monster Segmeger (毒炎怪獣 セグメゲル, Dokuen Kaijū Segumegeru; 18): A monster from Trigger Dark and Carmeara's past. First appeared in episode 5 of Ultraman Taiga.
- Spiritual Life Form Kyriel (精神生命体 キリエル人, Seishin Seimeitai Kirieru-bito; 18, 19): A race of beings from the other dimension who previously fought against Ultraman Tiga in his titular series in a bid to earn the title of mankind's savior. Kyriel appeared in a human form in Kengo's world where he manipulated the Morpheus R (モルフェウスR, Morufeusu Āru) energy wave to put the GUTS-Select and the Giants of Darkness into a state of trance to determine their status as mankind's savior, eventually gaining the candidate in the form of Yuna. When Yuna choose to support Trigger in his fight against the Giants of Darkness, Kyriel decides to fight the Ultra on his own. He is portrayed by Makoto Takahashi (高橋 麻琴, Takahashi Makoto).
  - Infernal Warrior Kyrieloid (炎魔戦士 キリエロイド, Enma Senshi Kirieroido; 19): The Kyriels' combat form, used to fight Trigger after he was exhausted from fighting the Giants of Darkness. The tide of the battle is then changed to Trigger's favor when Tiga joins the fight and is killed by the combination of both Ultras' Zeperion Beams. First appeared in episode 3 of Ultraman Tiga.
- Electroshock Beastman Barriguiler (電撃獣人 バリガイラー, Dengeki Jūjin Barigairā; 20): A blue oni-themed monster with Kansai dialect who resembles Gorothunder from Ultraman Taiga and wields the Barrilin Club (バリリン棒, Baririn-bō). Prior to the series, Barriguiler had once arrived on Earth and faced against Yuzare from the Ultra Ancient Era before he left after being defeated. In the present day, he was hired by Hudram to capture Yuna in exchange of his favorite food, facing against Trigger along the way and even using Akito as a leverage. Once Yuna revealed the space creature of Hudram's empty promise, Barriguiler assists Trigger in defeating Hudram and departed from Earth on good terms. He is voiced by Kentaro Shimazu (島津 健太郎, Shimazu Kentarō).
- Blue Foam Monster Aboras (青色発泡怪獣 アボラス, Seishoku Happō Kaijū Aborasu; 21): An ancient monster from 350 million years prior who was sealed alongside its rival Banila due to their poisonous body composition. The lightning from Barriguiler's attack caused Aboras to be resurrected first before Banila joins along as they fought in the middle of the city. Aboras was killed by Glitter Trigger Eternity, while its poisonous essence was purified by Trigger Dark to prevent damages to the nearby environment. First appeared in episode 19 of Ultraman.
- Red Fire Monster Banila (赤色火焔怪獣 バニラ, Sekishoku Kaen Kaijū Banira; 21): Aboras' rival who share the same fate of being sealed in the distant past before the two were released to fight against each others. Due to Banila's flame capable of cancelling out Aboras' foam, Trigger Dark use it to save Kengo before for both Triggers to fight against them. Banila was destroyed by Trigger Dark, followed by Glitter Trigger Eternity purging the poison away from populated areas. First appeared in episode 19 of Ultraman.
- Clockwork Warrior Mecha Musashin (カラクリ武者 メカムサシン, Karakuri Musha Meka Musashin; 22): A samurai mecha that Ignis installs as his trap system to prevent Kengo and Akito's interference from his search for the Eternity Core. The mecha was destroyed by Glitter Trigger Eternity and Nursedessei's Battle Mode, with its sword used by Trigger Dark in his final fight against Hudram. Its weapons are Janomegasser (ジャノメガッサー, Janomegassā) and Musashin Sword (ムサシンソード, Musashin Sōdo), while its set of attacks are Fujiyama Slash Wave (フジヤマ斬波, Fujiyama Zanpa), Hazy Moon Projectile (オボロ月, Oborozuki), Fallen Warrior Aura: Spirit Orb Wheel (落ち武者オーラ・ヒトダマ大車輪, Ochimusha Ōra Hitodama Daisharin) and Ukiyo-e Barrier (ウキヨ防壁, Ukiyo Bōheki). It is voiced by Tomonobu Koshi (越 知靖, Koshi Tomonobu).
- Ancient Monster Gomora (古代怪獣 ゴモラ, Kodai Kaijū Gomora; 24): One of the many monsters to exist since the Ultra Ancient Civilization, who had its data inscribed into a Monster Key used by GUTS-Select as part of empowering their attacks. Gomora was one of the many Earth monsters to surface during Megalothor's reign of terror. First appeared in episode 26 of Ultraman.
- Subterranean Monster Telesdon (地底怪獣 テレスドン, Chitei Kaijū Teresudon; 24) and Berserk Monster Arstron (凶暴怪獣 アーストロン, Kyōbō Kaijū Āsutoron; 24): Two of the many Earth monsters to surface during Megalothor's reign of terror. First appeared in episodes 22 of Ultraman and episode 1 of Return of Ultraman respectively.
- Subterranean Monster Pagos (地底怪獣 パゴス, Chitei Kaijū Pagosu; 24, Movie): One of the many Earth monsters to surface during Megalothor's reign of terror. Two years later, it was manipulated by the Rylar cult into attacking the TPU headquarters to cover their escape. It fought against and was destroyed by Ultraman Z Alpha Edge. First appeared in episode 18 of Ultra Q.
- Ferocious Space Shark Genegarg (凶暴宇宙鮫 ゲネガーグ, Kyōbō Uchū Zame Genegāgu; Movie): A monster that Rylar manipulated alongside the second Deathdrago, fighting against Trigger and Z. First appeared in episode 1 of Ultraman Z.

=== Ultra Galaxy Fight: The Destined Crossroad ===
- Friendly Giant Bird Lidorias (友好巨鳥 リドリアス, Yūkō Kyochō Ridoriasu; Prologue): Musashi's bird monster companion from Earth, it joined the fight with Cosmos in against the invading Absolutians. First appeared in episode 1 of Ultraman Cosmos.
- Great Space Monster Bemstar (宇宙大怪獣 ベムスター, Uchū Dai Kaijū Bemusutā; 1): A space monster and a Devil Splinter victim that was killed by Ginga and Taiga in Planet Penol (惑星ペノル, Wakusei Penoru). First appeared in episode 18 of Return of Ultraman.
- Empire Hunting Soldiers Darklops (帝国猟兵 ダークロプス, Teikoku Ryōhei Dākuropusu; 1, 2): The Belial Galactic Empire's mass-produced combat robots that guarded a Devil Splinter in the ruins of the empire until X, Geed, and Titas destroyed them. First appeared in Ultraman Zero: The Revenge of Belial.
- Empire Machine Soldiers Legionoids (帝国機兵 レギオノイド, Teikoku Kihei Regionoido; 1, 2): The Belial Galactic Empire's mass-produced combat robots that guarded a Devil Splinter in the ruins of the empire until X, Geed, and Titas destroyed them. First appeared in Ultraman Zero: The Revenge of Belial.
- Oil Monster Pestar (油獣 ペスター, Yujū Pesutā; 1): A monster in Planet Liquitor (惑星リクエター, Wakusei Rikuetā) and a Devil Splinter victim that was killed by Fuma. The Devil Splinter is later claimed by Gina Specter under The Kingdom's orders. First appeared in episode 13 of Ultraman.
- Capsule Monsters (カプセル怪獣, Kapuseru Kaijū; 6): Ultraseven's trio of monsters; Windom (ウインダム, Uindamu), Miclas (ミクラス, Mikurasu) and Agira (アギラ) from his titular series that he kept in person and deployed when he is incapable of direct intervention. When Tartarus unleashed a platoon of Absolutian grunts on Planet Babel, Seven deployed them to support the Ultra Warriors in their fight.

=== Galaxy Rescue Force Voice Drama ===
- Great Space Monster Bemstar (7): A space monster that fought against Ribut and Melos using its flight speed. It was killed by Ultraman Neos.
- Space Sea Phantom Alien Valky (宇宙海人 バルキー星人, Uchū Kaijin Barukī Seijin; 11): An alien who appeared on an ocean planet to raise Samekichi, wanting to raise the monster at the cost of said planet's ecosystem. Joneus and Sora helped reaching a compromise with the Valky by shrinking Samekichi to an appropriate size. He is voiced by Tetsuo Kishi and first appeared in episode 53 of Ultraman Taro.
- Marine Animal Samekujira "Samekichi" (海獣 サメクジラ サメキチ, Kaijū Samekujira Samekichi; 11): Alien Valky's infant Samekujira, who he plans to raise on an ocean planet in anticipation of the monster's growth despite the threat it pose to the planet's ecosystem. Through an agreement with Joneus, Samekichi was shrunk into a manageable size for Valky's convenience. Its race first appeared in episode 53 of Ultraman Taro.
- Space Iron-Severing Monster Dinozaur (宇宙斬鉄怪獣 ディノゾール, Uchū Zantesu Kaijū Dinozōru; 14): Originally traveling with its herd, a single Dinozaur went split from its group and landed on a planet. Ribut and Poccola were forced to purge Dinozaur off the planet when its presence threatened the ecosystem. First appeared in episode 1 of Ultraman Mebius.
- Saucer Creature Nova (円盤生物 ノーバ, Enban Seibutsu Nōba; 17, 21, 25, 28): Alien Babarue RB's Battlenizer monster, through which he uses it to commit petty thefts to make ends meet. Nova originally fought against Ribut and Melos until it was called in to retreat by its master. Following RB's enlistment into Galaxy Rescue Force, Nova is also registered into the team and is occasionally called as his support during combat. First appeared in episode 49 of Ultraman Leo.
- Skull Monster Red King (どくろ怪獣 レッドキング, Dokuro Kaijū Reddo Kingu; 21): A holographic monster that fought against Ribut, Poccola, and RB during training in simulated combat inside the virtual simulator. It was defeated through the latter's Nova. First appeared in episode 8 of Ultraman.
- Transparent Monster Neronga (透明怪獣 ネロンガ, Tōmei Kaijū Neronga; 27, 28): Daada's monster that was killed alongside him, Kelbim, and Giestron by the Galaxy Rescue Force members. First appeared in episode 3 of Ultraman.
- Brutal Space Monster Kelbim (宇宙凶険怪獣 ケルビム, Uchū Kyōken Kaijū Kerubimu; 27, 28): Daada's monster that was killed alongside him, Neronga, and Giestron by the Galaxy Rescue Force members. First appeared in episode 4 of Ultraman Mebius.
- Ferocious Monster Giestron (凶猛怪獣 ギーストロン, Kyōmō Kaijū Gīsutoron; 27, 28): Daada's monster that was killed alongside him, Neronga, and Kelbim by the Galaxy Rescue Force members. First appeared in the Ultraman Festival 2019.

=== Secret Origins of the Nursedessei ===
- Space Yeti Alien Wild "Zagar" (宇宙野人 ワイルド星人 ザガァ, Uchū Yajin Wairudo Seijin Zagaa; 14, 15, 25): An alien with a Niigata dialect whose spaceship, Nurse, crash-landed on Earth and tried to repair it through various illegal works. Although his actions were discovered, TPU decided to help him fix Nurse in return for a copy of the ship's schematics. He marries Terumi Yazaki. He is portrayed by Kōichi Toshima, his race first appearing in episode 11 of Ultraseven.

=== Ultraman Decker ===
Sphere Synthetic Monsters

Sphire Synthetic Monsters (スフィア合成獣, Sufia Gōsei-jū) are creatures born from the Spheres assimilating into their intended target, forcing them to become extensions of their will.

- Ancient Monster Gomora (3): A subterranean monster that mysteriously awakened. While terrorizing the urban area, GUTS-Select members formed an attack plan by severing the monster's tail and luring it away from the citizen. First appeared in episode 26 of Ultraman.
  - Ancient Synthetic Monster Sphere Gomora (古代合成獣 スフィアゴモラ, Kodai Gōsei-jū Sufia Gomora; 3, 23): As a result of the Spheres' intervention, Gomora was assimilated with them and fused into the first Sphere Synthetic Monster, gaining attacks such as Sphere Ultra Oscillation Wave (スフィア超振動波, Sufia Chō Shindō-ha) and Sphere Shock Wave (スフィア衝撃波, Sufia Shōgeki-ha). The monster fought against Decker Strong Type and is destroyed by Dolnade Breaker. Much later, Sphere-Gomora is recreated by the Spheres as one of the three guards of the Sphere Obelisk before its death by Decker Dynamic Type.
- Sphere Megalothor (7, 8): See above
- Skull Monster Red King (9): A monster that Grace fights to protect Mika when it rampages in the urban area. Red King retreats when GUTS-Select joins the fray, getting infected by the Spheres off-screen.
  - Skull Synthetic Monster Sphere Red King (どくろ合成獣 スフィアレッドキング, Dokuro Gōsei-jū Sufia Reddo Kingu; 9, 23): While retreating elsewhere, Red King gets infected by the Spheres into its current form, gaining enhanced brute strength and the ability to emit shockwaves. It retains its weak point at the neck, which GUTS Gryphon exploits by firing the Hyper Thorn Laser while Grace hold off the monster. Much later, Sphere-Red King is recreated by the Spheres as one of the three guards of the Sphere Obelisk before its death by Decker Dynamic Type.
- Newly Constructed Monster Neomegas (新創獣 ネオメガス, Shinsō-jū Neomegasu; 10): A clone monster which former TPU monster researcher Maki Shigenaga created using an unnamed dormant monster that she discovered and synthesize it with the cells of other monsters. To keep the monster in control and its full power at bay, she implants a control device to its brain, which is linked to her pendant. Neomegas fought against both Sadola and King Guesra as a form of demonstration before GUTS-Select catching up to her actions. When Sawa destroys the controller pendant, Neomegas went berserk with its limiter removed. In GUTS Hawk, HANE2 bails Decker from the ensuing blast and drops him to perform Dolnade Breaker. Neomegas is destroyed, with remains of its cells salvaged by TPU to prevent attempts at reviving it through cloning. The monster is based on Neosaurus from episode 16 of Ultraman Dyna.
  - Newly Constructed Synthetic Monster Sphere Neomegas (新創合成獣 スフィアネオメガス, Shinsō Gōsei-jū Sufia Neomegasu; 12, 23): Using Neomegas' leftover thorn, the Spheres resurrect the monster as an addition to their forces. Sphere-Neomegas made its way to the Sorafune City's spaceport, exactly where Spheresaurus first attacked a year prior and defeats Decker through the assistance of a few Sphere Soldiers. After injecting energy substance to the Earth for overnight, Sphere-Neomegas fought against the combined forces of GUTS-Select/TPU and Ultraman Decker. The monster is obliterated by HANE2/Terraphaser's TR Mega Buster, with Decker providing cover against the Synthetic Monster's attacks. Much later, Sphere-Neomegas is recreated by the Spheres as one of the three guards of the Sphere Obelisk before its death by Decker Dynamic Type.
- Sphere Judgementer Galactron MK2 (スフィアジャッジメンター ギャラクトロンMK2, Sufia Jajjimentā Gyarakutoron Māku Tsū; 19): An updated variant of Galactron who was one of the many leftover debris from TPU Moon Base's ruins. The robot becomes a vessel for the Spheres to fight against Ultraman Trigger and Decker and is destroyed by the Ultras' strongest forms. First appeared in Ultraman Geed the Movie.
- S-Plasma Fusion Monster Sphere Geomos (Sプラズマ融合獣 スフィアジオモス, Esu Purazuma Yūgō-jū Sufia Jiomosu; 21): A monster that was born from a Sphere Soldier assimilating with building and technology. Using the power of S-Plasma, Sphere-Geomos brings several Spheresaurus from the future to continue the Sphere's assimilation process on Earth, only to be foiled by Ultraman Decker and the time-displaced Ultraman Dyna. The monster is based on Geomos and Neo Geomos from episodes 35 and 36 of Ultraman Dyna.

Others

- Destructive Rampage Dragon Deathdrago (2): A monster from episode 5 of New Generation Tiga, resurfacing a year after the Spheres had isolated Earth from the solar system. Deathdrago fought against the GUTS Falcon and Ultraman Decker, managing to weaken the latter until Miclas even the playing field by trouncing the monster. It was destroyed by Decker's Selgend Beam.
- Dimension Card Monsters (ディメンションカード怪獣, Dimenshon Kādo Kaijū): Monsters summoned through the power of light, resulted when their Mons Dimension Cards are scanned into the Ultra D Flasher. They serve as supporters to Ultraman Decker when the latter is in need of reinforcements, but their operation time is limited. Through the Ultra Dual Sword, Decker can execute Triple Mons Scram (トリプルモンススクラム, Toripuru Monsu Sukuramu) to summon all three of them at once.
  - Miclas (2, 5, 9, 14): A monster with heavy emphasis on brute strength. First appeared in episode 3 of Ultraseven.
  - Agira (6, 9, 14): A monster that uses its horn as a sole weapon. First appeared in episode 32 of Ultraseven.
  - Windom (9, 14): A metallic bird monster with precisive aiming from its forehead. First appeared in episode 1 of Ultraseven.
- Destructive Monster Mons-Ahgar (破壊獣 モンスアーガー, Hakai-jū Monsu Āgā; 4): A series of monsters commercially sold in outer space, one particular Mons-Ahgar was kept in a capsule and sent towards Earth 1,300 years prior. In the present day, Mons-Ahgar awakens after its capsule was dug out by the construction company of Tochinoki City, intending to destroy Earth to put a stop to their space exploration program. The monster is destroyed when Decker Strong Type smashes its head (the weak point), followed by GUTS Gryphon opening fire on the same spot. First appeared in episode 11 of Ultraman Dyna.
- Space Monster Bemular (宇宙怪獣 ベムラー, Uchū Kaijū Bemurā; 4): A holographic version of the monster. First appeared in episode 1 of Ultraman.
- Dark Alien Alien Shaplay (暗黒星人 シャプレー星人, Ankoku Seijin Shapurē Seijin): First appeared in episode 20 of Ultraseven.
  - 4: A holographic version of the alien which appears in GUTS-Select's virtual training simulation.
  - Movie: One of the many servants under Professor Gibellus who invades the Nursedessei. He is voiced by Akira Hongo (本郷 章, Hongō Akira).
- Space Monster Eleking "Elly" (宇宙怪獣 エレキング エリー, Uchū Kaijū Erekingu Erī; 5): An Eleking which "Yuko" keeps as a pet, working ends meet to sustain both the monster and her life. Because of Yuko overfeeding it and the Earth's atmospheric influence, Eleking grew rapidly to the size of an adult monster within a year, catching the attention of GUTS-Select when it consumes electricity at a nearby urban area. Eleking turned violent when it was overfed with TPU's emergency electricity supply until Ultraman Decker stops the monster with Miracle Type and regressing it back to its larva form. Because of this, Elly gets to live with Yuko once more, now with its feeding habit guided by Sawa. Its race first appeared in episode 3 of Ultraseven.
  - Lim Eleking (リムエレキング, Rimu Erekingu; 5): Elly's transitional form from its larva stage to a fully grown adult. First appeared in Ultraman Mebius as a Maquette Monster copy of the original monster.
- Subterranean Monsters (地底怪獣, Chitei Kaijū; 6): Earth-dwelling monsters that lived beneath the park of Sorafune City. Due to the mining activity for Supercritical Metal (超臨海メタル, Chō Rinkai Metaru), Pagos and Gudon attacked the surface world and eventually dragging Ultraman Decker and GUTS-Select into their underground nest. The nest has since obliterated from Nursedessei Maxima Nurse Cannon.
  - Pagos (6): A monster that surfaces to feed on the mined Supercritical Metal, its appearance is heralded by a golden rainbow. After Decker gets dragged underground, Pagos team up with Gudon to fight the Ultra in their territory until Ryumon/GUTS Falcon fired a marker on Pagos' nape, allowing Nursedessei to destroy the monster and the Twin Tail colony nearing it.
  - Gudon (グドン; 6): Pagos' companion and the Twin Tails' predator who attacks from beneath the ground. Dragging Decker to their nest, Gudon proceed to team up with Pagos until it was teleported to the surface world by Decker Miracle Type and destroyed by Realiut Wave. First appeared in episode 5 of Return of Ultraman.
  - Telesdon (6): A monster that shares its nest with Gudon and Pagos, joining the two in overwhelming Decker. It was destroyed by the recently summoned Agira.
  - Twin Tail (ツインテール, Tsuin Tēru; 6): A group of monsters that lived underground, with Decker and Ryumon/GUTS Falcon happen to stumble upon their nest in the middle of fighting the other subterranean monsters. The Twin Tails are destroyed by Nursedessei Battle Mode's Maxima Nurse Cannon. First appeared in episode 5 of Return of Ultraman.
- Ultra-Ancient Plant Gijeran (超古代植物 ギジェラン, Chō Kodai Shokubutsu Gijeran; 8): Also known as Giant R'lyeh (巨大ルルイエ, Kyodai Ruruie), it is an ancient plant resembling Kengo's R'lyeh which is used by the Ultra-Ancient Civilization for medicinal purposes. When Carmeara ventured into the Eternity Core and transform into Megalothor, remnant of said plant latched into the monster. 10 years later, Gijeran is revived when Megalothor is resurrected by the power of Sphere, growing from a small flower to gigantic proportion overnight. To counter its hallucinating pollen, Yuna delivers the herbicide which is loaded into Nursedessei, spraying it causes the plant to wilt. The plant is based on Gijera from episode 45 of Ultraman Tiga.
- Space Martial Artist Gregore "Grace" (宇宙格闘士 グレゴール人 グレース, Uchū Kakutō-shi Guregōru-jin Gurēsu; 9, Movie): A martial artist who is reputed as the Steel Phenomenon (鋼の魔人, Hagane no Majin) in outer space. He was originally intend to reach out to Ultraman Trigger as his final fight before retirement, but is trapped on Earth alongside Mika when the Spheres isolated the entire planet. A year later when he encounters Kanata and briefly return to fight Red King, GUTS-Select agrees to honor his wish, but the Sphere-Red King's intervention forces him to forfeit and held the monster long enough for GUTS Gryphon to take aim. Grace survives the fight nevertheless and is last seen under treatment from TPU. He is portrayed by Koji Nakamura (中村 浩二, Nakamura Kōji), who previously portrayed Takanobu Kuwabara in Ultraman Gaia, his race first appearing in episode 31 of Ultraman Dyna.
- Mika (ミカ; 9): Grace's daughter, who supports him in his career as a fighter. Her attempts at blackmailing Kanata is quickly shot down by Grace, but nevertheless gets her wish at seeing him fighting alongside Decker in against Sphere-Red King. She is portrayed by Haruna Enomoto (榎本 遥菜, Enomoto Haruna).
- Rock Monster Sadola (岩石怪獣 サドラ, Ganseki Kaijū Sadora; 10): A monster which becomes Neomegas' first kill during its rampage in the urban area. First appeared in episode 3 of Return of Ultraman.
- Sea Monster King Guesra (海獣 キングゲスラ, Kaijū Kingu Gesura; 10): A venomous monster which rampages in an urban area. It was killed by Neomegas after firing its heat ray at point blank. First appeared in Superior Ultraman 8 Brothers.
- Transformation Monster Gazort (11): A monster who disrupts the delivery of Terraphaser mid-air, forcing the robot to go on an unauthorized fight to defend itself. Gazort then left after the robot successfully delivered to its testing fight, with Raibasser and its flock of children succeeding the attack.
- Lightning Bird Monster Raibasser (稲妻怪鳥 ライバッサー, Inazuma Kaichō Raibassā; 11): A horned variant of Maga-Basser from episode 1 of Ultraman Orb, which has the ability to summon an electromagnetic typhoon and shooting volts of lightning from its abdomen. Raibasser continues where Gazort left off by disabling Terraphaser to the point of frying its original AI, forcing Asakage to replace it with HANE2 as the designated pilot. Terraphaser then uses its arsenal to overpower the bird monter, followed by Ultraman Decker delivering Triple Decker Scram as the finishing blow to destroy it.
- Lightning Bird Monster Hinabasser (稲妻怪鳥 ヒナバッサー, Inazuma Kaichō Hinabassā; 11): The Raibasser's chick who travels in a flock, attacking the GUTS-Select members to prevent getting HANE2 to activate Terraphaser. Once Raibasser begins to fight the robot, a human sized Ultraman Decker joins them in killing the small monsters before he rises up to deliver the killing blow against their giant brethren.
- Noise Monster Noiseler (騒音怪獣 ノイズラー, Sōon Kaijū Noizurā; 14): A monster that appeared targeting the city prior to Spheresaurus' return. It was killed by the combined power of Decker and Terraphaser. First appeared in episode 7 of Ultraman 80.
- Laelia (レリア, Reria; 15, 22, 24, 25): A Bazdor native and Agams' wife, she lost her life during the Sphere's invasion on their planet. Her death becomes the catalyst to Agams' resentment towards mankind as a whole. When Mother Spheresaurus is about to approach the Earth, Laelia's spirit appears in front of Agams, encouraging him to make amends and finally redeeming himself. She is portrayed by Yuui Fujiyama (藤山 由依, Fujiyama Yūi).
- Twin-Headed Monster Pandon (双頭怪獣 パンドン, Sōtō Kaijū Pandon; 16): The adult form of Spinnie after numerous exposure to the Ghosed Ore (ゴースド鉱石, Gōsudo Kōseki). It fought against and is killed by Decker's Decker Strong Dynamic. First appeared in episode 48 of Ultraseven.
  - Floating Baby Monster Spinnie (浮遊幼獣 スピニー, Fuyū Yōjū Supinī; 16): An infant Pandon who crashed on Earth alongside the Ghosed Ore a few years prior to the Spheres imprisoning the Earth in Sphere Barrier. A few days after Agams showing his true colors to TPU, Spinnie appeared from its impact crater and frequenting at the Kariya City, where it manages to escape capture from TPU forces while visiting the Ghosed Ore on several occasions to both increase its power and accelerating its life cycle. While being chased by GUTS-Select, Spinnie gets fired by the young members as it fell into the crater, only to rise as an adult Pandon.
- Ancient Monster Gomess (S) (古代怪獣 ゴメス(S), Kodai Kaijū Gomesu (Esu); 17): A monster who is recognized by TPU as the larger variant of the smaller Gomess breed. Gomess (S) marches towards the Komie City around the same time when Murahoshi gets suspended by TPU for going AWOL a decade prior during Metsu-Orochi's attack. When Gomess (S) penetrated through all of TPU's defenses, Murahoshi is reinstated when Ryumon is able to exonerate his captain from his charges. While still recovering from his arm injury, Kanata/Decker is able to propel Gomess (S) midair before Nursedessei fires the Neo Maxima Nurse Cannon to finish off the monster. First appeared in episode 1 of Ultra Galaxy Mega Monster Battle: Never Ending Odyssey.
- Extradimensional Being Yapool (異次元人 ヤプール, Ijigen-jin Yapūru; 18, 19): A recurring foe of the Ultra Warriors who collaborated with Agams to eliminate Decker. By posing as Agams, he lures the Ultra into a trap and banished him to outer space where he intercepted Kanata and Kengo. Narrowly able to escape from being assimilated by the Spheres, Yapool is killed by the human-sized Trigger and Decker. He is voiced by Yasuhiro Kikuchi (菊池 康弘, Kikuchi Yasuhiro) and first appeared in episode 1 of Ultraman Ace.
- Giant-Ant Terrible-Monster Aribunta (大蟻超獣 アリブンタ, Ōari Chōjū Aribunta; 18): Yapool's ant-themed Terrible-Monster with burrowing capabilities. It was sent to initially dragging Ichika and Ryumon to their deaths before Decker saved them and fought the Terrible-Monster. Despite Agams' attempt at aiding Aribunta by summoning Terraphaser, the Terrible-Monster is killed by Decker Dynamic Type. Its resulting explosion is used by Yapool in a gambit to temporarily expel Decker away from Earth. First appeared in episode 5 of Ultraman Ace.
- Security Robot Zomborg Soldier (警備ロボ ゾンボーグ兵, Keibi Robo Zonbōgu-hei; 19): A series of security robots stationed within the TPU Moon Base, all which were initially deactivated when the base was abandoned and being used as the Spheres' nest. During Kanata and Kengo's investigation, the robots reactivated under Yapool's will to fight against the two until they were destroyed. First appeared in episode 39 of Ultraman Dyna.
- Space Robot King Joe (宇宙ロボット キングジョー, Uchū Robotto Kingu Jō): First appeared in episode 14 of Ultraseven.
  - 19: One of the many robots laying around the abandoned TPU Moon Base.
  - Movie: Another King Joe is under ownership of an Alien Pedan who works under Gibellus' orders. It is destroyed by Ultraman Dinas.
- Empire Machine Soldier Legionoid (19): One of the many robots laying around the abandoned TPU Moon Base.
- Primordial Amphibian Ragon (海底原人 ラゴン, Kaitei Genjin Ragon; 20): An aquatic creature who was revered as a deity by the Ragonites, the latter in turn performing a dance ritual in regular basis to appease the former. In the present day, Ragon reawakens when it was no longer revered by the locals and manages to defeat Decker in a cave in. However it was quelled of its anger by Nagi and returns to its home dimension. First appeared in episode 21 of Ultra Q.
  - Ragon Child (子ラゴン, Ko Ragon; 20): The Ragon's smaller form that appeared 70 years prior to play alongside the young Nagi. First appeared in episode 8 of Ultraman Orb as "Ragon Jr.".
- Winged Monster Chandlar (有翼怪獣 チャンドラー, Yūyoku Kaijū Chandorā; 22): A flying monster which Agams manipulated through a similar pendant used by Shigenaga to control Neomegas. Agams unleashed the monster when GUTS-Select surround his hideout as a distraction for his escape. It was killed by HANE2/GUTS Gryphon's Gryphon Talon Beam after GUTS-Select members anticipated the monster's arrival through their weapons. First appeared in episode 8 of Ultraman.
- Dinas the Lavian (ラヴィー星人 ディナス, Ravī Seijin Dinasu; Alien Lavie "Dinas"; Movie): A female alien and the host of Ultraman Dinas who joins forces with GUTS-Select against Gibellus' forces. Following Professor Gibellus' death, she joins TPU and its second space exploration team. She is portrayed by Kayano Nakamura (中村 加弥乃, Nakamura Kayano).
- Gibellus' alien army (Movie): An army of aliens under Professor Gibellus' leadership who has been enhanced through his experimentation and opposes GUTS-Select.
  - Alternate Dimension Alien Alien Icarus (異次元宇宙人 イカルス星人, Ijigen Uchūjin Ikarusu Seijin): Gibellus' servant who was killed by Ultraman Dinas. He is voiced by Tomokazu Seki and first appeared in episode 10 of Ultraseven.
  - Strategy Alien Alien Pedan: Gibellus' servant who uses his own King Joe model. He is voiced by Danchō Yasuda (団長安田) of Yasuda Dai Circus.
  - Insect Alien Alien Ckalutch (昆虫宇宙人 クカラッチ星人, Konchū Uchūjin Kukaratchi Seijin): Gibellus' servant who works under Alien Pedan's leadership. He is voiced by HIRO of Yasuda Dai Circus and first appeared in Ultraman Orb The Movie.
  - Alien Phantom Alien Zelan (宇宙怪人 ゼラン星人, Uchū Kaijin Zeran Seijin): Gibellus' servant who works under Alien Pedan's leadership. He is voiced by Kuro-chan (クロちゃん) of Yasuda Dai Circus and first appeared in episode 31 of Return of Ultraman.
  - Galmess (ガルメス人, Garumesu-jin): Professor Gibellus' servant who works under Alien Pedan's leadership. He is voiced by Yoshihisa Arai (荒井 義久, Arai Yoshihisa) and first appeared in Ultraman Orb The Movie.
  - Space Emperor Alien Bado (宇宙帝王 バド星人, Uchū Teiō Bado Seijin): Gibellus' servant who invades the TPU headquarters. He also invaded Planet Ravie. He is voiced by Iori Yonahara (よなはら 伊織, Yonahara Iori) and first appeared in episode 19 of Ultraseven.
  - Specter Phantom Alien Ghose (幽霊怪人 ゴース星人, Yūrei Kaijin Gōsu Seijin): Gibellus' servant who invades the TPU headquarters. First appeared in episode 48 of Ultraseven.
  - Electric Wave Phantom Lecuum (電波怪人 レキューム人, Denpa Kaijin Rekyūmu-jin): Gibellus' servant who invades the TPU headquarters. First appeared in episode 26 of Ultra Q: Dark Fantasy.
  - Slaughter Alien Hypnas (殺戮宇宙人 ヒュプナス, Satsuriku Uchūjin Hyupunasu): Gibellus' servant who invades the TPU headquarters. First appeared in episode 8 of Ultraseven X.
  - Possessing Alien Alien Serpent (憑依宇宙人 サーペント星人, Hyōi Uchūjin Sāpento Seijin): Gibellus' servant who invades the Nursedessei. First appeared in episode 39 of Ultraman Mebius.
  - Alien Groza (グローザ星系人, Gurōza Seikeijin): Gibellus' servant who invades the Nursedessei. He is a tribute to Grozam from episode 43 of Ultraman Mebius.
  - Anti-Gravity Alien Alien Godola (反重力宇宙人 ゴドラ星人, Han Jūryoku Uchūjin Godora Seijin): Gibellus' servant who invaded Planet Lavie and was killed by Ultraman Dyna. First appeared in episode 4 of Ultra Seven.
  - Saber Tyrant Alien Magma: Gibellus' servant who invaded Planet Lavie.
- Chick Monster Baby Zandrias (雛怪獣 ベビーザンドリアス, Hina Kaijū Bebī Zandoriasu; Movie): A monster on Planet Lavie. First appeared in episode 1 of Ultraman Taiga.
- Young Parent Monster Young Mother Zandrias (若親怪獣 ヤングマザーザンドリアス, Wakaoya Kaijū Yangu Mazā Zandoriasu; Movie): The mother of Baby Zandrias on Planet Lavie. First appeared in episode 1 of Ultraman Taiga.

=== Ultraman Regulos ===
- Raptorial Monster Guebasser (猛禽怪獣 グエバッサー, Mōkin Kaijū Guebassā): The original variant of Maga-Basser from episode 1 of Ultraman Orb, which appears on Planet D60. First appeared in episode 5 of Ultraman R/B.
- Hitman Terrible-Monster Baraba (殺し屋超獣 バラバ, Koroshiya Chōjū Baraba): The Terrible-Monster that Volcan obtained from Yapool. It was killed by Regulos. First appeared in episode 13 of Ultraman Ace.

=== Ultraman Regulos: First Mission ===
- Vicious Alien Alien Zarab (凶悪宇宙人 ザラブ星人, Kyōaku Uchūjin Zarabu Seijin): An alien who restored the body of Reibatos on Planet Maijii under Alien Reiblood's orders. In his Imit-Ultraman (にせウルトラマン, Nise Urutoraman) form, he was killed by Ribut. He is voiced by Masaya Kamikura (神倉 雅弥, Kamikura Masaya) in Japanese and by Tom Constantine in English respectively and first appeared in episode 18 of Ultraman.
- Freezing Monster Gandar (凍結怪獣 ガンダー, Tōketsu Kaijū Gandā): A monster resurrected by Alien Reiblood possessing the body of Reibatos. It was killed by Scott. First appeared in episode 25 of Ultraseven.
- Regenerating Monster Star Bem Gyeron (再生怪獣 ギエロン星獣, Saisei Kaijū Gieron Seijū): A monster resurrected by Alien Reiblood possessing the body of Reibatos. It was killed by Chuck and Beth. First appeared in episode 26 of Ultraseven.
- Bodyguard Monster Black King (用心棒怪獣 ブラックキング, Yōjinbō Kaijū Burakku Kingu): A monster resurrected by Alien Reiblood possessing the body of Reibatos. It was killed by Great. First appeared in episode 37 of Return of Ultraman.
- Space Bacterium Dallie (宇宙細菌 ダリー, Uchū Saikin Darī): A monster resurrected and enlarged by Alien Reiblood possessing the body of Reibatos. It was killed by Powered. First appeared in episode 31 of Ultraseven.
- Space Combat Robot Ultraman Shadow (宇宙戦闘ロボット ウルトラマンシャドー, Uchū Sentō Robotto Urutoraman Shadō): A robot made by Alien Zarab. It was destroyed by Regulos. First appeared in Ultraman Zearth 2: Superman Big Battle - Light and Shadow.
