= List of Ultraman Cosmos characters =

This page is the character list of the 2001 Ultra Series, Ultraman Cosmos. The series coincided with a prequel movie Ultraman Cosmos: The First Contact in 2001, later on succeeded with spin-off movies Ultraman Cosmos 2: The Blue Planet (2002) and Ultraman Cosmos vs. Ultraman Justice: The Final Battle (2003).

== Musashi Haruno ==
Musashi Haruno (春野 ムサシ, Haruno Musashi) is the main viewpoint character in the series and is Ultraman Cosmos' human host. Before his mother remarried, his actual name was Musashi Isohata (五十畑 ムサシ, Isohata Musashi).

Having lost his astronaut father Hiroyasu Isohata (五十畑 浩康, Isohata Hiroyasu) to a rocket accident in 1993, the 11 year old Musashi dreams of becoming an astronaut in honoring his late father. One night, while observing the stars, Musashi encountered the weakened Cosmos and reflect the sunlight to his forehead, therefore recharging the giant. His encounter with Cosmos was dismissed by others, especially during Basical's invasion on Earth until he was reassured by Mari and the Baltan child Shirubyi, allowing him to call upon Cosmos once more.

Eight years later, the 19-year-old Musashi becomes a pilot candidate of the SRC Universal Development Center. After the Chaos Header started their invasion by possessing his monster companion Lidorias, Musashi merged with Cosmos and since then joined Team EYES in order to secure monsters and fight against Chaos and other extraterrestrial invaders. Despite his optimistic approach, his reliance on Cosmos also turned into a hindrance that almost get them killed until the Ultra was upgraded into Eclipse Mode. Starting from the second half, Musashi and Team EYES became a frequent target of Chaos Header, the entity being well aware of his double life. In the final episode, realizing that Chaos is simply misguided in his actions, Musashi's will to purify it resulted with Chaos Header transformed into an angelic form and departed from Earth. His actions caused him to be acknowledged as a true hero by Cosmos as they parted ways.

In 2012, Musashi had long retired from Team EYES and is pursuing in his dream to become an astronaut. In the event of Scorpus' attack on Earth, Musashi joined Team SEA as they establish contact with the Alien Gyashi and bonded with Cosmos to stop Sandloss with the help of Justice. Three years later, Musashi finally became an astronaut for the Cosmo Noa (コスモ・ノア, Kosumo Noa) an attempt to bring Earth monsters away to a different planet. After being betrayed by Justice, both Cosmos and Musashi were trapped in a different space time as Ayano mobilized his colleague and had their Future Energy (フューチャーエナジー, Fyūchā Enajī) restore him back. Bearing no ill intent, he healed Justice as they fought Gloker Bishop and Giga Endra. With the fight ended, Musashi settled his life on the terraformed Planet Juran to watch over the migrated Earth monsters and married Ayano, having a son named Sora.

Despite his pacifism, Musashi is also skilled in armed combat and a formidable pilot. The Radiant Stone (輝石, Kiseki) given to him by Cosmos was meant to summon the Ultra by his own will and can simultaneously recharge his energy with Musashi's own bravery. Once both Ultra and human merged, the pyroxene transformed into the Cosmo Pluck (コスモプラック, Kosumo Purakku), which allows Musashi to become Cosmos. In their separated state, the Radiant Stone allows Musashi to become an orb of light which merged with the Ultra's Color Timer.

He is portrayed by Taiyo Sugiura (杉浦 太陽, Sugiura Taiyō). As a child, he is portrayed by Kounosuke Tokai (東海 孝之助, Tōkai Kōnosuke).

== Team EYES ==
Team EYES members from left to right: Fubuki, Ayano, Hiura, Musashi, Shinobu, and Doigaki.

EYES (アイズ, Aizu; Elite Young Expert Squad) is a subsidiary of SRC and the viewpoint team of Ultraman Cosmos. Stationed within the Treasure Base, their main goal is to protect monsters and benevolent aliens, but would also participate in warfare against hostile forces if the condition is called for. In The Final Battle, much of the original team members had retired as they were replaced by younger generations and moved on with their respective jobs.

=== Team EYES members ===
- Harumitsu Hiura (ヒウラ ハルミツ, Hiura Harumitsu): (Note: The characters are referred to their names in Kanji: Harumitsu Hiura (日浦 晴光), Shinobu Mizuki (水木 忍), Keisuke Fubuki (風吹 圭介), Koji Doigaki (土井垣 浩次), and Ayano Morimoto (森本 綾乃).) The 33-year-old captain of Team EYES and one of the founding members of the SRC research project. He is affectionately called "cap" by his teammates and was the reason Musashi was allowed to join Team EYES. Though essentially a gentleman, Hiura has a wild side that comes out when he finds himself in battle. In 2015, he becomes an SRC engineer and a university professor. He is portrayed by Daisuke Shima (嶋 大輔, Shima Daisuke).
- Shinobu Mizuki (ミズキ シノブ, Mizuki Shinobu): The vice-captain of Team EYES, 28 years old. Mizuki is one of the original defense instructors and joined Team EYES after sympathizing with their policies and ideals. While she is generally reserved, she often takes the lead in battle and guides her team through dangerous situations with great care and experience. Due to their similar backgrounds, she has known Fubuki since his early days in J.A.D.F.. In 2015, Shinobu returned to the defense army and served as their instructor. She is portrayed by Kaori Sakagami (坂上 香織, Sakagami Kaori).
- Keisuke Fubuki (フブキ ケイスケ, Fubuki Keisuke): A 23-year-old former JADF officer and the rookie member of EYES before Musashi. He has a cool, yet slightly aggressive personality that SRC initially did not want on their Team EYES project. He often comes into conflict with other members on how to deal with the corrupted monsters, especially butting heads with Musashi many times. The two form a deep friendship throughout the series as Fubuki comes to understand Musashi and his feelings towards life, through which captain Hiura usually puts the two on missions as Harukaze Combi (春風コンビ, Harukaze Konbi). (Note: Literally Spring-Wind Duo, this terminology was arranged together by combining the first Kanji of their surnames.) Though Fubuki is strong, he was a sick child who was unable to defend those closest to him; this led to him wanting to become strong to protect others, an ideal which was eventually washed away by a need to simply be strong. 3 years later in Ultraman Cosmos vs. Ultraman Justice: The Final Battle, Fubuki has become the captain of a new batch of Team EYES members and fights with the ideals of Musashi in mind. He is portrayed by Hidekazu Ichinose (市瀬 秀和, Ichinose Hidekazu) and by Kenta Arai (荒井 賢太, Arai Kenta; childhood).
- Koji Doigaki (ドイガキ コウジ, Doigaki Kōji): The 25-year-old mechanic of Team EYES and seen as the most naive member of the team. He hails from Kōchi Prefecture, and his teammates often think of him as a country boy because of this. He was called a genius scientist at a young age and was watched closely by the SRC project. Koji joined the team so he could escape his father, a man who he shares an uneasy relationship with. In 2015, Doigaki becomes the chief of SRC science division. He is portrayed by Koichi Sudo (須藤 公一, Sudō Kōichi) and by Yūki Kakimoto (柿本 祐貴, Kakimoto Yūki; childhood).
- Ayano Morimoto (モリモト アヤノ, Morimoto Ayano): A 19-year-old member of the team and the youngest member, younger than Musashi by 10 months. Ayano is very spirited and often spoiled due to her upbringing. She has a habit of falling in love with handsome men and doesn't concern herself with femininity. She was initially very cold towards Musashi, unable to accept that her junior on the team was actually older than she was and often referred to him as "Member Musashi" throughout most of the series. The two seem to form a close bond as the series plays out, Ayano eventually on a first-name basis with Musashi by the end of the show. In The Final Battle, she became the manager of Kaburaya Monster Reservation Center and managed to gather Musashi's colleague and her mother as they donated their Future Energy to save him from the space-time. As revealed in Ultraman Saga, she married Musashi and settled her life on Planet Juran with a son named Sora. She is portrayed by Mayuka Suzuki (鈴木 繭菓, Suzuki Mayuka) and by Rio Konnai (近内 里緒, Kon'nai Rio; childhood).

=== 2015 Team EYES members ===
A new group of Team EYES led by Captain Fubuki, succeeding the first team, to which they referred to as "The Eyes".

- Eiichi Kashima (カシマ エイイチ, Kashima Eiichi): The passionate vice-captain who regularly team up with Fubuki. He is portrayed by Kei Shimizu (清水 圭, Shimizu Kei).
- Natsuki Kuramoto (クラモト ナツキ, Kuramoto Natsumi): The sole female member. She is portrayed by Yurika Asada (麻田 ユリカ, Asada Yurika).
- Kazumi Watarai (ワタライ カズオミ, Watarai Kazumi): The team's main analyzer, he remains at the base to establish contact with Delacion. He is portrayed by Dai Tōjō (東城 大, Tōjō Dai).
- Ryōjirō Shōda (ショウダ リョウジロウ, Shōda Ryōjirō): A cool-headed pilot with an occasional hot-blooded moment. He is portrayed by Masaki Nishina (仁科 克基, Nishina Masaki), who would go on to portray Ryu Aihara in Ultraman Mebius.

=== Team EYES mechas ===
- Core Module (コアモジュール, Koa Mojūru): Part of SRC's Core Tecch System (コアテックシステム, Koa Tekku Shisutemu), it is a 3-seater V/STOL aircraft with long nosed and shot nosed variations. As its name suggest, the aircraft served as a core for most of Team EYES' mechas and is capable of operating independently as an escape pod.
  - SS: An all-gray colored unit which was piloted by Musashi during Lidorias' possession from Chaos Header. It was shot down by the infected monster itself. The "SS" notation is short for "single seater" (シングルシーター, Shinguru Shītā).
- Tecch Thunder (テックサンダー, Tekku Sandā): Team EYES' class of fighter jets, four combinations existed per four separate components and the Core Module as a base. Red colored parts are the A1 and A2, while blue-colored parts are B1 and B2. In The Final Battle, the Tecch Thunder units are further optimized into the black colored Tecch Raigar (テックライガー, Tekku Raigā), as space variants are known for the "KS" notation.
1. The all-red machine which combines both A1 nosecone and A2 thrusters. It boasted high speed and maneuverability in mid-air, as well as perfect in reconnaissance missions. It is piloted by both captain Hiura and Fubuki. Its Tecch Raigar counterpart is boarded by Kashima and Shōda, while Fubuki and Natsuki piloted its KS variant.
2. The all-blue machine which combines both B1 nosecone and B2 thrusters. Being reserved for rescue and protection, it boasted the lowest speed out of four modules but is equipped with multiple tools for disaster countermeasures and monster protection. The main pilot is Shinobu. Its Tecch Raigar counterpart is further optimized, allowing the machine to partake in actual combat other than monster protection and piloted by Fubuki and Natsuki, however, its KS variant is yet to be deployed due to the problems in balancing during the flight.
3. Combines A1 nosecone and B2 thrusters, it is a large support aircraft with high firepower and multiple rescue tools. After overcoming his fears, Doigaki becomes the major pilot of this machine. Although its Tecch Raigar counterpart did not appear on-screen, the machine appeared as its KS variant to participate in an attack against Giga Endra, piloted by Kashima.
4. Combines both A2 and B1 thrusters, it is presented as a compact high speed machine with multiple assault and rescue tools. Its main pilot is Musashi. Although its Tecch Raigar counterpart did not appear on-screen, the machine appeared as its KS variant to participate in an attack against Giga Endra, piloted by Shōda.
- Tecch Spinnar (テックスピナー, Tekku Supinā): An advanced model of Tecch Thunder with an enhanced "SP" rear part replacing the A2 and B2 thruster units. As in all units, the machine is equipped with laser beams and missile launchers. The SP thruster unit is created by Doigaki based on the concept of shōgi, hence it is reversible on both sides depending on the mission: the red colored SP-S (Surface) and blue colored SP-R (Reverse).
1. Combines both A1 nosecone and SP-S unit. It served as protect, capture and support type with excellent mobility and high speed flight. The main pilot is Fubuki. In The Blue Planet, a "KS" variant was developed by SRC Universal Research Center and piloted by Musashi during his exploration to a ruined Planet Juran.
2. Combines both B1 and SP-R unit. It resumed the purpose of Tecch Thunder 2 with faster flight speed in addition to SOAGG Beam Cannon (ソアッグビーム砲, Soaggu Bīmu Hō) and Victranger (ヴィクトランジャー, Vikutoranjā). The main pilot is Shinobu.
- Tecch Diver (テックダイバー, Tekku Daibā): Non aircraft Core Based Modules equipped with D rear unit, each are assigned to different regions other than air.
  - Land Diver (ランドダイバー, Rando Daibā): A subterrene resulted from the combination of C2 and D units.
  - Sea Diver (シーダイバー, Shī Daibā): A submarine resulted from the combination of C1 and D units, equipped with manipulator sub arms and missile torpedo. The improved variant Marine Diver (マリンダイバー, Marin Daibā) appeared in The Blue Planet, under ownership of Team SEA.
- Tecch Booster (テックブースター, Tekku Būsutā): A massive spacecraft built by Dr. Kimoto with the help of SRC's Space Development Center. Because of its massive size, the aircraft houses three Core Modules; one on the front and two others on its pair of boosters. It also houses a variety of weapons, in addition to a pair of arm manipulators. For emergency purposes, the Tecch Booster can separate into three components for each Core Module pilots to control it or for auto-piloting, leaving the front unit as the sole crewed aircraft. In the battle against Chaos Ultraman Calamity, Hiura ejected both rear parts as sacrificial bullets to assist Cosmos.
- Shepherd (シェパード, Shepādo): Team EYES' patrol car, its main model is Honda Insight.
- Cat Frisker Machine (猫じゃらしマシン, Nekojarashi mashin): A machine which Ayano loaned from SRC in order to bait Mudon out as part of Operation: Cat Frisker (猫じゃらし大作戦, Nekojarashi Dai Sakusen). Its name and method is a reference to Setaria viridis plants being used as natural toys for cats in Japan.

== SRC ==
The Scientific Research Circle (科学調査サークル, Kagaku Chōsa Sākuru; SRC) is an organization in Ultraman Cosmos. From The First Contact, it initially started as a small non-profit research organization founded by Minazuki Industrial Technology Institute (水無月工業技術研究所, Minazuki Kōgyō Gijutsu Kenkyūsho; MITI). Their actions during the fight against Basical and Don Ron captured the attention from United Nations, which proceed to turn it into a massive organization within the span of 8 years.

=== Original Seven ===
The founding members of SRC would be known to as the Original Seven (オリジナルセブン, Orijinaru Sebun), the team having appeared in The First Contact. Despite their membership, they also enlisted on daily jobs as normal civilians, while usually active by night or during monster attacks on daylight.

- Kensaku Kimoto (木本 研作, Kimoto Kensaku): One of the founding members of MITI, its parent organization and the owner of a toy hospital in Musashi's neighboring area. He invented Clevergon as a companion to young Musashi and the Troy Total mecha for the SRC to use. He returned 8 years later in episode 20 of Cosmos, as his motto proclaimed that "there is no end to making toys". He was portrayed by Shunji Fujimura (藤村 俊二, Fujimura Shunji).
- Noboru Akatsuki (アカツキ ノボル, Akatsuki Noboru): The captain of SRC. He is portrayed by Tarō Kawano (川野 太郎, Kawano Tarō).
- Kyōko Watanabe (ワタナベ キョウコ, Watanabe Kyōko): The female member who is also their computer expert. She worked as a music teacher in Musashi's elementary school. She is portrayed by Emiri Nakayama (中山 エミリ, Nakayama Emiri).
- Kido (キド): A technical expert and mood maker of the team who worked at an automobile research institute during the daylight. In The Blue Planet, he was promoted to the captain of Team SEA, but nonetheless still retains his skill as a technician. He is portrayed by Shingo Kazami (風見 しんご, Kazami Shingo).
- Raiden (ライデン): His true name is Kaoru (カオル), he is a sweet tooth who worked at a cake shop. He is portrayed by former Sumo wrestler Mainoumi Shūhei (舞の海 秀平).
- Ichinose (イチノセ): Another female member who worked as a support despite being a competent martial artist. She is also familiar with astronomy. She is portrayed by Chiyomi Matsumoto (松本 智代美, Matsumoto Chiyomi).
- Sakaguchi (サカグチ): SRC's full-time member, working as a support mechanic. He is portrayed by Hiroshi Kamachi (蒲地 宏, Kamachi Hiroshi).

=== SRC members in Ultraman Cosmos ===
- Director Ikeyama (イケヤマ管理官, Ikeyama-kanri-kan): The administrator of SRC Monster Conservation Management Center. He is a kind person who understands Musashi and is peaceful with other monsters. He returned in The Final Battle as part of Musashi's colleague gathered by Ayano to donate their Future Energy in restoring Musashi. He is portrayed by Hyōe Ichikawa (市川 兵衛, Ichikawa Hyōe).
- Azusa Niimi (新見 あづさ, Niimi Azusa; 8, 13, 14, 20): A 33 year old doctor in SRC Medical Center, she only appeared in the first half of the series. She is portrayed by Kayano Komaki (小牧 かやの, Kayano Komaki).
- Hiroko Honda (本田 広子, Honda Hiroko; 13, 14): Azusa's nurse assistant. She is portrayed by Keiko Hiro (広 啓子, Hiro Keiko).
- Noboru Ōmori (大森 登, Ōmori Noboru; 8): An SRC member who invented a dream invading device, Dream Theater (ドリームシアター, Dorīmu Shiatā). He is portrayed by Jinsei Morishita (森下 じんせい, Morishita Jinsei).
- Migita (右田; 35): Dr. Kawaya's main assistant and major apprentice, the two usually play baseballs during break period even if it's against the rules. He was among the victims of Ragstone's manipulation, which turned him into a skilled man that completed a drug that was in development hell for a decade. He is portrayed by Masakazu Migita (右田 昌万, Migita Masakazu), one of the series' writers.
- Yasue Sawaguchi (サワグチ ヤスエ, Sawaguchi Yasue; 17, 44, 55): An old friend of Hiura and developer of most of SRC's mechas, her stern behavior earned the nickname "Ms. Lightning" by Musashi. Despite having known each other for a long time, she maintained a platonic relationship with Hiura. In episode 55, Sawaguchi left Earth after getting a job in Germina III space station. She is portrayed by Kumiko Hara (原 久美子, Hara Kumiko).
- Ida (イダ; 17) and Tanaka (タナカ; 17): Sawaguchi's coworkers, they were captured alongside her by a trio of Gigi until Cosmos saved them. They are portrayed by Chishin Toda (戸田 知新, Toda Chishin) and Jiro Mochizuki (望月 二郎, Mochizuki Jirō).
- Mitsuya (ミツヤ; 21, 22, 63): An astronaut working for SRC's Universal Development Center and Musashi's coworker prior to the latter's recruitment into Team EYES. Mitsuya was trapped in Planet Juran after being attacked by Chaos Parastan, forcing Team EYES to rescue him before JADF could launch their missile. At some point of time, he discovered a tablet with Chaos Header's origin and sent it to Team EYES for research purposes. He is portrayed by Issey Takahashi (高橋 一生, Takahashi Issei), who would go on to voice the titular character of Shin Ultraman.
- Noboru Kawaya (カワヤ ノボル, Kawaya Noboru; 25, 31, 35, 41, 43, 47, 48, 50, 57, 65): SRC's doctor and a womanizer of sorts, he always courted Shinobu with little success. Despite his sloppy attitude, he had a tragic past where he ran away from the responsibility of operating on a colleague out of fear. Although the colleague was treated by a different doctor, this gave him a huge regret and he moved on to SRC. He is portrayed by Shigeki Kagemaru (影丸 茂樹, Kagemaru Shigeki), known for the role of Tetsuo Shinjoh in Ultraman Tiga.
- Hara (原; 41, 48): Dr. Kawaya's nurse assistant. She is portrayed by Miyuki Yuda (湯田 美由紀, Yuda Miyuki).
- Hazumi (ハズミ): An old friend of Hiura from college. He became a scientist under JADF, but quit his job as the chief scientist of its Scientific Technical Development Section after seeing the horror of his creation Dabides 909 being misused. He supported the SRC and Doigaki in researching Chaos Chimera. He is portrayed by Takumi Tsutsui (筒井 巧, Tsutsui Takumi).

=== Team SEA ===
A sub-faction of SRC which aimed to protect marine life forms, including aquatic monsters. Led by Kido, one of the Original Seven, its headquarters is in Rota Island (ロタ島, Rota-tō) of the North Mariana Archipelago (北マリアナ諸島, Kita Mariana Shotō). Musashi joined them in the events of The Blue Planet as they encounter the Alien Gyashi, which lead to the conflict against Sandloss.

- Officer Hyūga (ヒュウガ隊員, Hyūga-taiin): The sole female member, a mechanic pilot who can operate marine vehicles with no difficulty. She is portrayed by Risa Saito (斉藤 りさ, Saitō Risa), previously known for the role of Ryo Yumimura in Ultraman Dyna.
- Officer Kanou (カノウ隊員, Kanō-taiin): A quiet marine biology specialist who is good at computer operations. He is portrayed by Takao Kase (加瀬 尊朗, Kase Takao), previously known for the role of Kouhei Kariya in Ultraman Dyna.
- Officer Makabe (マカベ隊員, Makabe-taiin): A cowardly member in charge of data ring. He is portrayed by Koji Nakamura (中村 浩二, Nakamura Kōji), previously known for the role of Takanobu Kuwabara in Ultraman Gaia.

=== SRC members in movies ===
- Vice-president Kinozaki (キノザキ副代表, Kinozaki-fuku-daihyō): The deputy representative of SRC. At the age of 48 years old, he wished to build an understanding with the Alien Gyashi race. He is portrayed by Ryo Kinomoto (木之元 亮, Kinomoto Ryō), previously known for the role of Gosuke Hibiki in Ultraman Dyna.
- Councillor Akagi (アカギ審議官, Akagi-shingi-kan): Kinozaki's aide and is the head of Project Blue (プロジェクト・ブルー, Purojekuto Burū), a system which covers the Earth with barrier until it was foiled by Sandloss. She is a 40 year old genius and believes in world peace. In The Final Battle, she becomes representative Ōwada's assistant. She is portrayed by Mio Takaki (高樹 澪, Takagi Mio), previously known for the role of Megumi Iruma in Ultraman Tiga.
- Representative Ōwada (オオワダ代表, Ōwada-daihyō): SRC's representative, whose sole appearance was in the Final Battle. He was portrayed by Tamio Kawachi (川地 民夫, Kawachi Tamio), previously portraying Sōichiro Sawai in Ultraman Tiga.

=== SRC mechas and vehicles ===
- Troy Total (トロイトータル, Toroi Tōtaru): The Original Seven's sole mecha, created by Dr. Kimoto. It has the ability to split into Troy A and Troy B respectively, which leads to the development of Core Module System in the main series. Its blue paint provides protection from bullets.
  - Troy A (トロイA, Toroi Ē): A bigger machine which boarded by the leading members as a data-collecting machine. It is equipped with giant punching gloves Dodekalove (ドデカローブ, Dodekarōbu) and giant loudspeakers Dodekapeaker (ドデカピーカー, Dodekapīkā).
  - Troy B (トロイB, Toroi Bī): A smaller aircraft which served as the prototype of the Core Modules used by Team EYES. It has excellent balance in mid-air performance and also VTOL functions. In addition to smaller Dodekalove and Dodekapeaker, it also possesses freezing gas emitter and can initiate autopilot.
- Bernard (バーナード, Bānādo): The Original Seven's patrol car, base model is a white colored Mercedes-Benz.
- Exploration ship Waltz (探査船ワルツ, Tansa-sen Warutsu): An exploration spacecraft piloted by Mitsuya of the SRC Space Development Center, it appeared in episodes 21, 55 and 63.
- Germina III (ジェルミナIII, Jerumina Surī): SRC's first full-fledged space station, themed after a snail shell. Its development was cancelled in 2005 after the death of the construction crew Reni Kurosaki, who was ejected to the cold vacuum of space without any sort of protective equipment until it was continued and finished in 2009. The succeeding model, Germina IV (ジェルミナIV, Jerumina Fō) is mentioned in The Final Battle.

=== Other facilities in SRC ===
- Kaburaya Archipelago SRC Monster Conservation Management Center (鏑矢諸島・SRC怪獣保護管理センター, Kaburaya Shotō Esu Āru Shī Kaijū Hogo Kanri Sentā): A massive archipelago which served as a protection area for monsters that are captured by SRC and Team EYES to prevent them from entering occupied areas. The entire island is surrounded by electromagnetic field to prevent intrusion from outside forces, especially the invasion of Chaos Header.
- SRC Universal Development Center (SRC宇宙開発センター, Esu Āru Shī Uchū Kaihatsu Sentā): A branch which focuses on the development of space, such as spacecraft, space stations, studies of extraterrestrial materials and nurturing astronauts among others. Musashi was part of this team before his recruitment into Team EYES. After the fight against Chaos Header ended, he returned to the Universal Center to continue fulfilling his dream as an astronaut.
- SRC-related Research Institutes (SRC関連研究機関, Esu Āru Shī Kanren Kenkyū Kikan): A research facility that Sawaguchi worked at in episode 17, it was briefly taken over by a trio of Gigi.
- SRC Medical Care Base (SRC特殊医療基地, Esu Āru Shī Tokushu Iryō Kichi): A medical facility near Point HH-7. It was attacked by Chaos Clevergon in episode 31 and turned into a temporary hospital in 48 during Team EYES and JADF's campaign against Waroga.
- SRC High Concentration Energy Storage System (SRC高濃度エネルギー貯蔵システム, Esu Āru Shī Kō Nōdo Enerugī Chozō Shisutemu): An energy storage facility which Chaos Clevergon try to attack in episode 31.
- SRC Research Facility (SRC研究施設, Esu Āru Shī Kenkyū Shisetsu): A high purity energy storage planet which Helzzking raid and drained of its energy in episode 38.
- SRC Scientific Analysis Center (SRC科学分析センター, Esu Āru Shī Kagaku Bunseki Sentā): A facility where Doigaki and Hazumi researched on Chaos Chimera enzyme, which they evacuated on episode 59 before being destroyed by Chaos Ultraman Calamity.
- SRC Biochemical Center (SRCバイオケミカルセンター, Esu Āru Shī Baio Kemikaru Sentā): A replacement facility for Doigaki and Hazumi in episode 60 to continue their study on Chaos Chimera.

== JADF ==
The Joint Armed Defense Force (統合防衛軍, Tōgō Bōei-gun; JADF) is an anti-heroic military faction of Ultraman Cosmos, whose recognized by using brute force in against monster threats. While usually butting heads with the pacifistic SRC and their sub-faction, Team EYES, both factions would willingly put aside their differences when facing a serious threat to humanity. The team itself has a major base in Tokyo.

=== JADF members ===
- Commander Sahara (佐原司令官, Sahara-shirei-kan): The highest leading figure of JADF. Despite his advances against monster threats, he was never an irrational person and displays several understandings to the situation. He is portrayed by Masahiro Sudō (須藤 正裕, Sudō Masahiro) and is named after Kenji Sahara, one of the actors of Ultra Q.
- Vice Commander Shishikura (宍倉副司令官, Shishikura-fuku-shirei-kan): The second-in-command of JADF, he is more rational than his coworkers. He is portrayed by Eiji Ōki (大城 英司, Ōki Eiji).
- Naval Officer Saijō (西条武官, Saijō-bukan): One of the most irrational officers, his behavior reflected that of Shark commander Shigemura and has a negative opinion for Team EYES' monster protection policy. His extreme lengths to violence resorted in worsening the situations, such as JADF being the result of Golmede Beta's mutation and Mazarugas' death by Dabides 909, which almost depriving them from any means of exterminating Chaos Header. He is portrayed by Atsushi Narasaka (奈良坂 篤, Narasaka Atsushi) and is named after Yasuhiko Saijō, one of the actors of Ultra Q.
- Junya Nagare (ナガレ ジュンヤ, Nagare Jun'ya; 33, 62): Saijō's right-hand man and the chief of monster extermination weapon development team Gallus (ガルス, Garusu). Like his boss, Nagare had a negative opinion for Team EYES, until his first hand experience on the team in episode 33 and later on supporting them in episode 62. He usually held the rocket launcher G-YG8. He is portrayed by Sōji Masaki (正木 蒼二, Masaki Sōji).
- Bengals Captain Oka (ベンガルズ隊長・岡, Bengaruzu Taichō Oka): The leader of Bengals, a tank division from JADF. He is portrayed by Hideki Oka (岡 秀樹, Oka Hideki), who had a cameo appearance as one of the evacuees in episode 1.
- Ishii (石井; 14, 25, 48, 58): A member of JADF's Special Task Force. He is portrayed by Hiroshi Ishii (石井 浩, Ishii Hiroshi), who previously portrayed Ryuichi Senuma in Ultraman Gaia, as both characters are even dressed the same way. Prior to his on-screen appearance, Hiroshi Ishii previously voiced Igomas from episode 4 of Cosmos.
- Ryoma Makabe (真壁 竜馬, Makabe Ryōma): A J.A.D.F. pilot and Musashi's former classmate from his high school years, appearing in the 2002 Telecoro Comic Winter edition. He was chosen to pilot the Robo Baltan in their campaign against Chaos Header and giant monsters. When the Robo Baltan was possessed by Chaos Header, Ryoma willingly allow himself to be killed instead of being a hostage, but Cosmos managed to save him before destroying Robo Baltan.

=== Sharks members ===
The National Emergency Corps Sharks (国家緊急部隊シャークス, Kokka Kinkyū Butai Shākusu) is JADF's elite sub-faction that exclusively appeared in the prequel movie, The First Contact.

- Staff Shigemura (シゲムラ参謀, Shigemura-sanbō): The main commander of said branch. At the height of Basical's invasion, Shigemura commanded the Sharks in against the vile alien and briefly confiscated Musashi's Radiant Stone before Shirubyi reclaim it. After Cosmos neutralized the threat, Shigemura tried to open fire on the Ultraman but was thwarted by Musashi's stepfather. He is portrayed by Ikkei Watanabe (渡辺 いっけい, Watanabe Ikkei).
- Shark Lieutenant (シャークス副官, Shākusu-fukukan): Shigemura's faithful lieutenant, distinctive for his black uniform and red beret. He is portrayed by Yōji Anjō (安生 洋二, Anjō Yōji).
- Shark Officers (シャークス隊員, Shākusu Taiin): Regular troopers in silver uniforms, red beret and armed with machine guns. Despite being well-trained, they participated in a yet comical chase against Musashi for his Radiant Stone. They are portrayed by Masato Nakamura (中村 正人, Nakamura Masato), Shinji Matsumoto (松本 真治, Matsumoto Shinji), Tomohisa Saitō (斉藤 陽佐, Saitō Tomohisa) and Yoshiyuki Yamazaki (山崎 義行, Yamazaki Yoshiyuki).

=== JADF members in movies ===
- Commander Inugami (イヌガイ司令官, Inugai-shirei-kan): The defense force's commander, he is prone to do rash decisions in against Sandloss and Delacion. He is portrayed by Kyūsaku Shimada (嶋田 久作, Shimada Kyūsaku), previously known for the role of Gonpachi Minato in Ultraman Neos.
- Staff Officer Hijikata (ヒジカタ参謀, Hijikata-sanbō): 38 year old deputy commander, who is otherwise calm in comparison to Inugami. He took the lead of attacking against the Glokers in The Final Battle. He is portrayed by Akitoshi Ōtaki (大滝 明利, Ōtaki Akitoshi), previously known for the role of Seiichi Munakata and Zoffy in Ultraman Tiga and Ultraman Neos respectively.

=== JADF mechas and vehicles ===
- Defense Force Fighters (防衛軍戦闘機, Bōei-gun Sentō-ki): Aircraft units of unknown model, they had been in service since The First Contact.
- Defense Force Tanks (防衛軍戦車, Bōei-gun Sensha): Type 90 tanks, they were mostly seen in service of the Bengals division.
- Burning Missile (バーニングミサイル, Bāningu Misairu): A giant heat-seeking missile used to intercept Ephemera. Fubuki baited the missile with his Tecch Thunder 1 as Cosmos destroy it but the strong backlash did affect the monster nonetheless.
- Floating Military Satellite Angelica (浮遊軍事衛星アンジェリカ, Fuyū Gunji Eisei Anjerika): A space satellite in episode 19, it was long disowned by JADF due to the declaration of global peace but its automated function broke and hit the Migelon's saucers. The Alien Migelon Reda hacked the satellite by taking over SRC's Treasure Base until Cosmos Corona Mode destroy it with Melting Wave. In The Blue Planet, a new attack satellite was deployed to intercept Sandloss.
- Chargers (チャージャーズ, Chājāzu): A training aircraft in Fubuki's days as a JADF cadet.
- Ultra-high Performance Missile (超高性能ミサイル, Chō Kōseinō Misairu): A planetary destruction missile in episodes 21 and 22, it was almost used by JADF to destroy Planet Juran until Cosmos managed to divert it from a planetary collision with Earth.
- Dabides 909 (ダビデス909, Dabidesu Kyū Maru Kyū): A cellular-killing missile developed by Hazumi in episode 59 and used by Saijō to kill Mazarugas. Its effect caused Hazumi to quit and worked with SRC from that point onward.
- Defense Force Test Area (防衛軍テストエリア, Bōei-gun Tesuto Eria): A training ground for Alt-Helzzking in episode 61.
- Robo Baltan (ロボバルタン, Robo Barutan): A giant robot that appeared in 2002 Telecoro Comic Winter edition, created as an anti-monster and Chaos Header weapon based on Alien Baltan "Basical Version". Its main weapons are Hyper Drill (ハイパードリル, Haipā Doriru) and scissor arm, as well as transforming into Star Baltan (スターバルタン, Sutā Barutan) aircraft. It was piloted by Ryoma Makabe and first used against Chaos Bug. While docking to a hangar in J.A.D.F., a piece of Chaos Header from the Chaos Bug possessed the robot and fought against Ultraman Cosmos. Assuming Corona Mode, Cosmos managed to save Ryoma before destroying the mecha altogether.

== Ultramen ==
=== Ultraman Cosmos ===
Ultraman Cosmos (ウルトラマンコスモス, Urutoraman Kosumosu) is the titular hero of the series, originally the protector of an unnamed planet which was ravaged by Chaos Header. Feeling guilty for his perceived failure, he swore not to let another planet fall into Chaos Header's grasps. At some point of time, Cosmos chased the Alien Baltan Basical to prevent him from invading Earth. Their conflict lead to an encounter with the young Musashi, who gives him the Radiant Stone. When Chaos Header started his attack on Earth, Cosmos bonded with the now-teen Musashi and had since assisted Team EYES in defending benevolent monsters and fending off against invaders from outer space. With Chaos Header building an antibody to counter Cosmos' exorcism, the Ultra in turn gain access to Eclipse Mode, which resulted from his sheer bond with Musashi. In the final battle, despite everyone including Cosmos' insistence to eliminate Chaos, Musashi's kind spirit empowers Cosmos' Luna Mode and purified the Chaos Header into a benevolent entity. This action leads to Cosmos separating from the boy, marking the end of his mission on Earth. However, future events such as Sandloss' invasion and threats from the Universal Justice leads to Cosmos bonding with Musashi again, in the end leading to both of them working as protectors of the terraformed Planet Juran.

As the warrior of kindness, Cosmos rarely kills his opponents and utilizes speed and self defense in combat. In the 2018 Ultraman Gaia novel, Cosmos is stated by Charija to empower himself with both energies from the Moon and Sun. His Mode Changes (モードチェンジ, Mōdo Chenji) include:

- Luna Mode (ルナモード, Runa Mōdo): Cosmos' blue-colored primary form, which is based on the Moon and represents the "kindness" of Ultraman. As Cosmos is a pacifist, he employs a gentle, defensive fighting style based on Tai Chi. His finishing techniques are Full Moon Rect (フルムーンレクト, Furu Mūn Rekuto) to pacify monsters and Luna Extract (ルナエキストラクト, Runa Ekisutorakuto) to exorcise Chaos Header. In Ultraman Saga, Luna Mode gains the offensive beams Moonlight Smash (ムーンライトスマッシュ, Mūnraito Sumasshu) and Full Moon Flasher (フルムーンフラッシャー, Furu Mūn Furasshā). When the Chaos Header develops an immunity to Luna Extract, the technique is phased out in favor of Eclipse Mode's abilities. His mask is designed after the original Ultraman.
  - Miracluna Mode (ミラクルナモード, Mirakuruna Mōdo): An enhanced Luna Mode that is achieved in response to Musashi's will to pacify Chaos Darkness. This form utilizes Luna Final (ルナファイナル, Runa Fainaru) with the growls of Lidorias, Mogrudon and Bolgils to purify the fiend into Chaos Header 0.
- Corona Mode (コロナモード, Korona Mōdo): Cosmos' red-colored combat form, based on the stellar corona, which represents the "strength" of Ultraman. Cosmos assumes this form when a peaceful solution cannot be achieved, adopting a more aggressive fighting style. His finishing moves are Naybuster Ray (ネイバスター光線, Neibasutā Kōsen) and Blazing Wave (ブレージングウエーブ, Burējingu Uēbu). Corona Mode can also perform Corona Extract (コロナエキストラクト, Korona Ekisutorakuto) to exorcise Chaos Header until it is no longer effective. Because of this, Cosmos begins to favor Eclipse Mode in combat, only assuming Corona Mode as a transition state.
- Eclipse Mode (エクリプスモード, Ekuripusu Mōdo): Cosmos's red and blue-colored super form, which is born from a solar eclipse and represents the "courage" of Ultraman. First appearing in episode 30, it is used to combat Chaos Header's growing strength and resistance to Luna Mode's Luna Extract.. As Eclipse Mode is reliant on the bond between Musashi and Cosmos, Cosmos is unable to use it on his own. Additionally, Cosmos can only maintain this form for one minute. Eclipse Mode's finishing move is Cosmium Ray (コズミューム光線, Kozumyūmu Kōsen), which both exorcises and destroys Chaos Headers without harming their host. The Cosmium Ray can also safely remove other forms of corruption. Eclipse Mode's mask emphasizes the fusion of Luna and Corona Mode.
- Space Corona Mode (スペースコロナモード, Supēsu Korona Mōdo): A purple-colored variation of Corona Mode meant for space exploration and combat. His finishing move is Overloop Ray (オーバーループ光線, Ōbārūpu Kōsen).
- Skeleton Corona Mode (スケルトンコロナモード, Sukeruton Korona Mōdo): Also known as Phantom Cosmos (ファントムコスモス, Fantomu Kosumosu), this form is an imaginary version of Corona Mode that appears in Musashi's dream. At the height of Scorpus' invasion on Earth, this form appears before Musashi. Aside from Skeleton Punch (スケルトンパンチ, Sukeruton Panchi) and Skeleton Kick (スケルトンスピンキック, Sukeruton Kikku), it retains the use of Blazing Wave.
- Future Mode (フューチャーモード, Fyūchā Mōdo): Ultraman Cosmos' strongest form, which combines Luna Mode's "kindness", Corona Mode's "strength" and Eclipse Mode's "courage" and is empowered by Future Energy to represent "hope." His finishing move is Cosmo Strike (コスモストライク, Kosumo Sutoraiku). In this form, Cosmos can donate a portion of his energy to replenish an Ultra's Color Timer. With Ultraman Justice, the two can perform combination attacks Cross Perfection (クロスパーフェクション, Kurosu Pāfekushon) and Double Rolling Attack (ダブルローリングアタック, Daburu Rōringu Atakku).

Ultraman Cosmos is voiced by Hiroyuki Sato (佐藤 浩之, Satō Hiroyuki), while his grunts in The First Contact is provided by Hisanori Koyatsu (小谷津 央典, Koyatsu Hisanori) and Tetsu Inada (稲田 徹, Inada Tetsu) in later two movies. His Luna, Corona and Future Modes are designed by Hiroshi Maruyama, while Eclipse and Space Corona are designed by Chisato Sugiura.

=== Ultraman Justice ===
Ultraman Justice (ウルトラマンジャスティス, Urutoraman Jasutisu) is a representative from the Universal Justice who overseer threats that are prophesied by Delacion. First appearing in The Blue Planet, he becomes the major protagonist of The Final Battle.

2,000 years prior, Justice mistakenly defended Sandloss under the initial belief that he was harmless, but the being turned into a universal threat which led the Ultra to cooperate with Cosmos on Earth to defeat him. This caused him to develop a sense of guilt and eventually becomes cynical. Assuming the form of a young lady named Julie (ジュリ, Juri), Justice defeated Cosmos and observed the progresses made by Glokers to destroy opposing forces. Witnessing the bravery of the Earth monsters and a particular young girl saving her dog, this gave Justice a change of heart as he fights against the Glokers, while making amends with Cosmos to stop the Giga Endra from ending all life on Earth. In aftermath of the battle, Julie witnessed Musashi's reunion with his friends as she smiled for the first time.

Justice transforms from his human through the use of Justlancer (ジャストランサー, Jasutoransā), a badge kept at the left side of Julie's dress when not in use. In contrast to Cosmos, Justice's main coloration is red and utilizes brute strength and aggression during combat. His forms include:

- Standard Mode (スタンダードモード, Sutandādo Mōdo): Ultraman Justice's default form. Aside from the focus of beam attacks, he can also utilize Justice Ability (ジャスティスアビリティ, Jasutisu Abiriti) to replenish Cosmos' energy and his finisher is Victorium Ray (ビクトリューム光線, Bikutoryūmu Kōsen).
- Crusher Mode (クラッシャーモード, Kurasshā Mōdo): Justice's enhanced form, which appeared in The Final Battle. It was accessed after he regains his faith on humanity and understanding the true meaning of the concept for "justice". At the cost of Standard Mode's silver protector, Justice gains a gold colored version which simplified to his chest area and can perform various combination attack with Cosmos Future Mode, such as Cross Perfection and Double Rolling Attack. His main finishing move is Dagrium Ray (ダグリューム光線, Daguryūmu Kōsen). In Ultraman Fighting Evolution 3, Crusher Mode retains the use of Standard Mode's Justice Ability.

Ultraman Justice is voiced by Osamu Ryutani (龍谷 修武, Ryūtani Osamu), while Julie is portrayed by Kazue Fukiishi (吹石 一恵, Fukiishi Kazue). Despite being a male Ultra, his feminine human form is used to emphasize that the concept of "justice" doesn't swing to either gender. Before that, he was meant to have a biseinen human form until it was scrapped to a young lady in order to emphasize as a foil to Musashi. Justice was meant to have an original video of his own, until it was scrapped. Additionally, an old magazine in the past stated that he was supposedly the contender for Cosmos' position as the show's main hero, but writer Hideyuki Kawakami deny this accusation in his blog.

=== Ultraman Legend ===
Ultraman Legend (ウルトラマンレジェンド, Urutoraman Rejendo) is the purple-colored Ultra resulted from the fusion of Cosmos and Justice, appeared in the climax of The Final Battle. Said to be the strongest warrior by Alien Gyashi, Legend possess a vast of unparalleled power which he used to save humanity from destruction by Giga Endra. Its main ability is Auroral Power (オーロラルパワー, Ōroraru Pawā) by absorbing the opponent's energy attack and his strongest finisher is Spark Legend (スパークレジェンド, Supāku Rejendo).

Ultraman Legend is voiced by Tetsu Inada.

== Antagonists ==
=== Alien Baltan Basical Version ===
Space Ninja Alien Baltan "Basical Version" (宇宙忍者 バルタン星人 ベーシカルバージョン, Uchū Ninja Barutan Seijin Bēshikaru Bājon) is the sole surviving member of the adult Alien Baltans when they lost their planet to a civil war sometime prior. Having perceived humanity's message to outer space from 50 years prior, Basical try to claim the Planet Earth in order for the Child Baltan in his care to survive but faced with the resistance of Ultraman Cosmos as they fought on Earth's stratosphere before crash landing on Japan. By possessing Donron, Basical forced the sacred beast on a rampage before he revealed himself. The next day, SRC try to pacify him through a lullaby but Sharks' attacks caused him to resort for aggressive solution and ignoring any negotiations with humanity. With Ultraman Cosmos summoned, Basical fought him in both the Haitsuki and on Earth. As Basical assumed the form of Space Ninja Neo Baltan (宇宙忍者 ネオバルタン, Uchū Ninja Neo Barutan), Cosmos assumed Corona Mode and their battle ended with Basical on the receiving end of Blazing Wave. Ceasing his fight with Cosmos, Basical committed suicide while his corpse was purified to its original form and escorted by the Child Baltan to their moon.

Basical's original form is capable of flying with a pair of wings, possessing monsters and shooting Dry Claw Ray (ドライクロー光線, Dorai Kurō Kōsen) from his pincers. He has a natural ability to manipulate the ground of Planet Baltan, which he did so to extract a chunk of it and turn into the mobile spaceship Haitsuki (廃月), as well as manipulating the ground into razor blades Claw Trap (クロートラップ, Kurō Torappu). As a giant, the Baltan can molt his skin as a protection or evolving into the Neo Baltan, he traded his pincers for the Bad Knife (バッドナイフ, Baddo Naifu) on his right and the Bundle Cord (バンドルコード, Bandoru Kōdo) whip on his left. He can also split into numerous clones, teleportation, firing Bump Spray (バンプスプレー, Banpu Supurē) from his shoulder armor and turn both of the weapons on his hands into twin hooks.

He was voiced by Daisuke Gōri (郷里 大輔, Gōri Daisuke) and Yukitoshi Hori (堀 之紀, Hori Yukitoshi). The Alien Baltan's inclusion to The First Contact is due to the movie's director Toshihiro Iijima is known for directing episodes 2 and 16 of Ultraman, both featuring the Baltan themselves.

=== Chaos Header ===
The Light Virus Chaos Header (光のウイルス カオスヘッダー, Hikari no Uirusu Kaosu Heddā) are the main antagonist of Ultraman Cosmos. It was never named in-series and was given such term by Doigaki as a contrasting element to Cosmos. Starting from episode 26, the entity adopted said term as their name, with Cosmos referring to this as such.

A collective hive mind of artificial energy organisms, their true purpose is to preserve the balance of outer space but fell into the conclusion of achieving it through sheer force alone. Prior to The First Contact, Chaos Header managed to turn the ecosystem of a planet Cosmos was guarding, which made it inhabitable to its population. On Earth, the Chaos Header manifest themselves either as a collective light particles, possession of monsters or cloning them. By the time it became interested with learning human emotions, the Chaos Header managed to create independent forms of their own. In the second half of the series, the Chaos Header becomes aware of Musashi's link to Cosmos and kidnapped him at one point after creating the Chaos Ultraman. As Ultraman Cosmos and Team EYES managed to strengthen their forces, the Chaos Header did the same to itself and grew stronger within every anti-Chaos Header weaponry threw upon itself. In the final episodes of the series, the Chaos Header's intense hatred for Cosmos lead to the birth of Chaos Darkness and goes on an all out attack against Team EYES. Once Musashi/Cosmos and three other monsters purify the Chaos Header, they realized the error of their ways and left Earth on peaceful terms. As of Ultraman Saga, the Chaos Header becomes the protector of Planet Juran and watching over the migrated monsters from Earth.

Since the Chaos Headers are a collective form of light energy operating under a singular hive mind, only a fraction of them appearing on Earth as several few would remain in Point P87 on the wormhole of outer space. Their main ability is to infect or cloning other monsters, which they refer to as the first step in achieving peace through a singular mind. Exposed victims, designated as Chaos Monsters (カオス怪獣, Kaosu Kaijū), sported red eyes and reddish protrusions from their bodies as they usually went berserk before fully giving cooperation to the entity. This ability is rendered ineffective the second time it affect a victim since by that point, their body had develop a specific antibody to combat Chaos' influence. As of episode 26, they gained the ability to create Materialized Chaos Header (実体カオスヘッダー, Jittai Kaosu Heddā), as independent corporeal forms to fight against Cosmos on their own. With the sole exception of Evelease, they still retain the ability to possess other monsters to force them fight by their side in against Cosmos and Team EYES.

- Chaos Header-Evelease (カオスヘッダー・イブリース, Kaosu Heddā Iburīsu; 26): The first materialized form, created when they gain interest in experimenting human emotions and after exiting the body of a possessed salaried worker. This form emphasizes on the human emotion for and made use of various telekinetic abilities upon scanning Cosmos' Corona Mode. When Evelease became stunned from witnessing human compassion, Cosmos took this chance to destroy him with Naybuster Ray.
- Chaos Header-Mebut (カオスヘッダー・メビュート, Kaosu Heddā Mebyūto; 29): The Chaos Header's second form, which obtained by posing as the infected Chaos Eligal and tricking Cosmos into draining his energies, before defeating said Ultra. While trying to kill a defenseless Cosmos, Mebut attempted to infect Lidorias but failed due to its recently acquired antibody. With Cosmos assuming Eclipse Mode, it managed to defeat Mebut through the use of Cosmium Ray, which safely penetrated Lidorias after it was used as a forced meat shield.
  - Imit-Chaos Eligal (偽カオスエリガル, Nise Kaosu Erigaru; 29): An impostor Chaos Eligal assumed by Chaos Header Mebut. His purpose is to fool Cosmos into draining his energy supply before revealing himself.
- Chaos Ultraman (カオスウルトラマン, Kaosu Urutoraman; 39, 40, 59): A black and blue-colored evil copy of Ultraman Cosmos Corona Mode, obtained by scanning Ultraman Cosmos when Musashi was lured out of the Treasure Base. Once defeating Ultraman Cosmos Corona Mode, he infected the Neldrant II and proceed to do the same to the monsters in Kaburaya Island until his Color Timer blinked. The Chaos Header was defeated by Cosmos Eclipse Mode as the Neldrant II was purified. In episode 59, it attempted to attack Doigaki and Hazumi to stop them from researching on the Chaos Chimera. When Cosmos defeated it with Cosmium Ray, the Chaos Header empowered the dark Ultra into Chaos Ultraman Calamity. Being a copy of Corona Mode, the Chaos Ultraman copied its moves and its finisher attacks, among them being Elimination Ray Darking Shot (破滅光線ダーキングショット, Hametsu Kōsen Dākingu Shotto) and Erosion Wave Invading Wave (浸蝕波動インベーディングウェーブ, Shinshoku Hadō Inbēdingu Wēbu). Through Giant Chaos Bullet Darkness Wheel (巨大カオス光弾ダークネスウィール, Kyodai Kaosu Kōdan Dākunesu Wīru), he can infect a total of 50 monsters at once into Chaos Monsters. Unfortunately being a copy of Ultraman Cosmos, Chaos Ultraman can only stay materialized for 3 minutes before dissipating into Chaos Header. In episode 59, he gains the additional ability to shoot Energy Light Bullet Dark Bullet (エネルギー光弾ダークブレット, Enerugī Kōdan Dāku Buretto) from his fist.
  - Chaos Ultraman Calamity (カオスウルトラマンカラミティ, Kaosu Urutoraman Karamiti; 59, 60, 62, 64): Chaos Ultraman's upgraded form, sporting red and black coloration in addition to being a knockoff of Ultraman Cosmos Eclipse Mode. Because of its tremendous strength, Calamity proves himself superior to its original counterpart and can only be defeated with the additional help from Chaos Chimera. After its second defeat, all traces of Chaos Headers on Earth were removed, leaving those in the P87 Point of space as its remnants. Cosmos baited the evil Ultra to the Moon, using Soaag minerals to weaken him until all Chaos Headers combine into Chaos Darkness. Being a copy of Eclipse Mode, his attacks were Breaking Smash (ブレイキングスマッシュ, Bureikingu Sumasshu) and Calamium Shot (カラミュームショット, Karamyūmu Shotto).
- Chaos Darkness (カオスダークネス, Kaosu Dākunesu; 64, 65): The Chaos Header's strongest form, which was created by fusing all of their essence and empowered through their common hatred for Cosmos. After receiving the Chaos Chimera pods from Tecch Booster, the monster seemingly vanished from the moon, but returned to Earth in this state. Acquiring immunity from all forms of anti-Chaos Header weapons, he fought against Cosmos and the humanity in a final battle before the Miracluna Mode and the help of Lidorias, Mogrudon and Bolgils managed to purify him. As its strongest form, the Chaos Darkness' abilities are Destruction Ray Crimson Break (破壊光線クリムゾンブレーク, Hakai Kōsen Kurimuzon Burēku) and Destructive Demon Sphere Dark Destroyer (破滅魔球ダークデストロイヤー, Hametsu Makyū Dāku Desutoroiyā).
  - Neo Chaos Darkness (ネオカオスダークネス, Neo Kaosu Dākunesu): In Ultraman Fighting Evolution Rebirth, the purified Chaos Header was brainwashed by Alien Mefilas to serve his malicious schemes, using its own essence to infect Waroga and Kyrieloid, even creating the trio Chaosroids. Chaos Darkness evolved into an enhanced form to engage in a fight against Ultramen Tiga, Gaia and Agul. When Cosmos came to their aid, Alien Mefilas merged with the Neo Chaos Darkness as his face appeared from his chest. Cosmos attempted to purify him, but Mefilas' influence was too strong, so much so that it evolved into Neo Chaos Darkness II. Aside from its old attacks, Neo Chaos Darkness can exhale Neo Chaos Destroyer (ネオカオスデストロイヤー, Neo Kaosu Desutoroiyā) from its mouth.
  - Neo Chaos Darkness II (ネオカオスダークネスII, Neo Kaosu Dākunesu Tsū): Its final form, the merging with Mefilas reached its highest point that the alien's face integrated with its chest. Chaos Darkness' skin turned black and replaced its lower torso with black aura which infect/combined with the entire city into a Chaos City (カオスシティ, Kaosu Shiti). Aside from its original attacks, Chaos Darkness can trap its opponent into a dimension of darkness to its advantage. It was defeated by Cosmos Miracluna Mode through the help of the trio Showa and Heisei Ultras.
- Chaos Header 0 (カオスヘッダー0, Kaosu Heddā Zero; 65, Saga): The purified form of Chaos Header, resulted from the very efforts of Cosmos, Lidorias, Mogrudon and Bolgils. It appeared as a golden angelic being and finally agreed in leaving the Earth in peaceful terms.
- Chaosroids (カオスロイド, Kaosuroido): A trio of evil Ultra Warriors, created through analyzing the combat tactics of Ultraman, Seven and Taro. The three was sent to attack the Land of Light and fought against their original counterparts. While originally appearing in Ultraman Fighting Evolution Rebirth video game, their suits made physical appearances in 2007 Ultraman Stadium, 2013 Ultraman Festival and finally a movie appearance in Ultraman Ginga Theater Special: Ultra Monster Hero Battle Royal!.
  - U: Created based on Ultraman, he was sent to steal the Plasma Spark and was defeated by his template, whose empowered by said device at the last minute. His attacks are Chaos Spacium Beam (カオススぺシウム光線, Kaosu Supeshiumu Kōsen), Chaos Slash (カオススラッシュ, Kaosu Surasshu) and Catch Ring Copy (キャッチリング・コピー, Kyatchi Ringu Kopī).
  - S: Created based on Ultraseven and utilized the stolen Ultra Key (ウルトラキー, Urutora Kī) as his weapon. He is capable of using the Chaoslugger (カオスラッガー, Kaosuraggā) on his head and Emerium Copy (エメリウム・コピー, Emeriumu Kopī). In the second Ginga Theater Special movie, he displays the ability to use Wide Shot Copy (ワイドショット・コピー, Waido Shotto Kopī).
  - T: Created based on Ultraman Taro and utilized the stolen Ultra Bell (ウルトラベル, Urutora Beru) as his main weapon. His attacks are Chaos Dynamite (カオスダイナマイト, Kaosu Dainamaito) and Chaos Strium Ray (カオスストリウム光線, Kaosu Sutoriumu Kōsen).

The Chaos Header and Chaos Ultraman are voiced by Koji Haramaki (服巻 浩司, Haramaki Koji). Its main appearance is expressed in CGI and is said to be the hardest part for the production crew. The plot of Chaos Headers infecting monsters into Chaos Monsters is made by partially modifying their suits. This was devised by main writer Ōnishi, who expressed that this opinion wasn't received well by the production team since it was no different than creating two suits altogether.

=== Alien Noir ===
Monster Hunter Alien Noir (怪獣狩人 ノワール星人, Kaijū Kariudo Nowāru Seijin; 43, 53) are a race of green aliens from J34 Star System with advanced science and technology. Their multiple experimentation of cybernetic conversions caused their planet to be depleted from monsters and went to Earth to continue their attempts. Although debuted in episode 43, they were revealed to have been on Earth as early as episode 8, using Inculas to induce humans into their dreamland for obtaining information on their race before using Ragstone to analyze human desires.

Because of Musashi's ability to pacify monsters, one lone member try to capture him before the youth was rescued by Fubuki, who kills the alien by firing his reflection. In episode 53, the Alien Noir desired for the baby Arados' time manipulation and demanded the monster from Team EYES under the promise to restore it to full health with their advanced science. They sent their Ragstone Mechalator after Team EYES objected the offer and participated in their saucer to stun Cosmos. With Ragstone banished to an alternate dimension, Cosmos opened fire on their saucers and kill the Noir aliens on board.

By themselves, the aliens can assume human forms, casting illusions, teleportation, dream invasion and firing energy beams. Monsters remodeled into their cyborg states are called as Mechalator (メカレーター, Mekarētā) units.

- Fantasy Monster Inculas (夢幻魔獣 インキュラス, Mugen Majū Inkyurasu; 8): A sheep/goat based monster whose named after the demon incubus. As revealed by a lone Alien Noir, Inculas' true purpose is to analyze the humans once sending them to their dreamland. Alarmed by Musashi's presence in their realm, the Inculas trapped the comatose victims within a castle and overpowered Cosmos with a cylindrical barrier. After being freed by Ayano, Cosmos assumed Corona Mode and destroy Inculas with Prominence Ball. Scriptwriter Hideyuki Kawakami admitted that he was supposed to introduce an alien race who manipulated Inculas in its debut, but forgot to do so in the final cut. At that moment, it was actually a different alien race altogether than the Noir themselves.
  - Fantasy Small Monster Small Inculas (夢幻小魔獣 スモールインキュラス, Mugen Sho Majū Sumōru Inkyurasu; 8): Inculas' lesser forms, which appeared as pink sheep. They can recombine to return to their original singular form.
- Hypnotic Monster Ragstone (催眠魔獣 ラグストーン, Saimin Majū Ragustōn; 35): A meteorite monster manipulated by the Alien Noir to analyze human emotions. Regressed into a building named Ragstone Core (ラグストーンコア, Ragustōn Koa), the monster hypnotizes on specified humans to strengthen their body potential to its limits, at the same time absorbing their brainwaves and free will in return. Ragstone gained its cultists from politicians to famous figures on television, including Dr. Kawaya's assistant Migita and Team EYES' Mizuki. After Ragstone was exposed by SRC, it reverted into its monster form and the Alien Noir saucer assisted it in hypnotizing other victims. Under Dr. Kawaya's advice, Cosmos expels the human emotion it previously absorbed, causing Ragstone to be retrieved by the Noir's saucer. Being another monster servant to Alien Noir, the Ragstone's suit was created from Inculas, the latter also served the same master. Ragstone was designed after an American football player, with its fight against Cosmos was emphasized to resemble such sports. Director Hideyuki Kawakami likens the episode plot to real life issues of the drug abuse in an easy to understand way for children. Instead of being driven aggressive in the same way to drug withdrawal symptom, it was written as just being collapse from it.
  - Ragstone Mechalator (ラグストーン・メカレーター, Ragusutōn Mekarētā; 53): In order to assist the Alien Noir in securing the baby Arados, Ragstone was further modified into a cyborg and fight Cosmos. Due to its extraterrestrial origin, Ragstone is able to adapt to the cybernetic modification without suffering from any setbacks. With the Ultra severely weakened, Arados used the last of its power to banish Ragstone to the edge of time.
- Taildass Mechalator (テールダス・メカレーター, Tērudasu Mekarētā; 43): (Note: In the show, it is spelt as "Taildas".) A different Taildass was captured by Alien Noir and forcefully converted into their cyborg monster. It rampaged in an urban area that Musashi and Fubuki were patrolling, but quickly died from stresses of the alien cybernetics. Its carcass was brought away to be examined by SRC.
- Neldrant Mechalator (ネルドラント・メカレーター, Nerudoranto Mekarētā; 43): (Note: In the show, it is spelt as "Neldorand".) A different Neldrant was captured by Alien Noir and forcefully converted into a cyborg. It was unleashed by a lone Noir in his dying breath and emerged in an urban area during sunset. Despite the efforts of Cosmos Eclipse Mode in removing the cybernetics, Neldrant died shortly after from the backlash and its carcass was carried by Cosmos to outer space.

The Alien Noir are voiced by Tetsu Inada, who would voice Cosmos' grunts in The Blue Planet and Final Battle. His human form is portrayed by Bob Suzuki (ボブ 鈴木, Bobu Suzuki).

=== Sky Demon ===
The Dark Mystic Demon Sky Demon (暗黒妖鬼 天空魔, Ankoku Yōki Tenkū Ma) is the main villain of New Century Ultraman Legend, a short video aired in theaters simultaneously with Ultraman Cosmos 2: The Blue Planet. Created from the combined spirits of defeated monsters from the past, its presence threatened the family of three until all 28 Ultra Heroes assembled and fired their Spacium Ray. Its firepower is said to contain the grudges of 20 monsters.

=== Sandloss ===
Variant Life Form Sandloss (異形生命体 サンドロス, Igyō Seimei-tai Sandorosu) is the antagonist of The Blue Planet. Years prior, a benevolent Sandloss was predicted as a threat by the Universal Justice but was spared by the red Ultraman Justice. However, the Space Prophet proved herself as Sandloss had become violent, malevolent and developed a sense of Social Darwinism, wherein the weak shall perish. He commanded his army of Scorpus to reduce any available planets into barren wastelands, having targeted the Planet Gyashi and Juran as Cosmos and Justice interfered. When Councillor Akagi's Project Blue protected the Earth, Sandloss supercharged his Scorpus to invade Earth and easily pummeled Cosmos Eclipse before Justice appeared and help the Ultra. Seeing how everything went to their favor, Sandloss darken the area as his trump card until he was killed by Cosmium and Victorium Beams.

Initially appearing as a massive cloud of darkness, his true form is a pillar-like body with flower-like arms and a face with three jaws. His attack includes Hard Kinesis (ハードキネシス, Hādo Kineshisu), Gigalent Rush (ギガレントラッシュ, Gigarento Rasshu), darkening the atmosphere with black gas and summoning an arm blade Black Lobel (ブラックローベル, Burakku Rōberu).

Sandloss is voiced by Daisuke Gōri.

=== Scorpus ===
Monster Weapons Scorpus (怪獣兵器 スコーピス, Kaijū Heiki Sukōpisu) are Sandloss' beetle-like bio-weapon monsters in The Blue Planet. They are responsible for the destruction of various planets and even try to intercept the fleeing Alien Gyashi before Justice interfered. On Earth, several of them made their attacks on Saipan areas and fought against the Rayja-possessed Gyashis. When Councillor Akagi utilized Project Blue to protect Earth, several of them became suicide bombers to disable the energy field for the rest of their kin to attack. Musashi's transformation into Cosmos allows him to destroy several of them. With two remaining members try to escape, they were killed by Sandloss, their own creator.

While naturally bipedal, they can transform into high-speed mode by concealing their legs for space travel. Their abilities include Poisonict (ポイゾニクト, Poizonikuto) rays to corrode the surrounding areas, Fragi-red Bomb (フラジレッドボム, Furajireddo Bomu) energy beams from their mouth and poisonous stingers.

=== Delacion ===
Delacion (デラシオン, Derashion) is the major antagonist of The Final Battle, whose appearance is entirely shrouded by light and has the ability to predict futures through Paradict (プラディクト, Paradikuto). The leader of Universal Justice (宇宙正義, Uchū Seigi), a body of peacekeeping organization tasked in preserving balance by eliminating potential threats. After the destruction of Sandloss, she set her sight to erase mankind due to their destructive future within 2,000 years and would replace them with an even more suitable species. After Ultraman Legend eliminated Giga Endra, the Delacion became convinced by humanity's potential and finally decided to put her faith on them.

- The Final Resetter Giga Endra (ファイナルリセッター ギガエンドラ, Fainaru Risettā Giga Endora) was Delacion's doomsday weapon, a giant saucer with the ability to execute mass extinction on a planet. By the time Justice revealed himself to the SRC and JADF, Giga Endra journeyed to Earth in 35 hours. Aside from the life form erasing ability, the Giga Endra is impregnable to various forms of attacks and can fire upon targets with its mono-eye. Upon arrival, it managed to defeat both Cosmos and Justice, but was destroyed by their combined form, Ultraman Legend.

The Delacion is voiced by Chisako Hara (原 知佐子, Hara Chisako), the wife of Akio Jissoji, one of the writers of Ultraman.

=== Glokers ===
The Space Resetter Glokers (スペースリセッター グローカー, Supēsu Risettā Gurōkā) are emotionless mono-eyed robot troops in The Final Battle, serving the Universal Justice to eradicate resistances.

- Gloker Mother (グローカーマザー, Gurōkā Mazā): Boomerang-shaped spaceships that accompanied Delacion, they were built with sturdy space metals that can resist various forms of Earth weaponry and mass-producing Gloker models for resistance eradication process. One particular model was sent to Earth by producing Gloker Borns while Justice oversees the cleansing process. When all Gloker Borns and Rook were destroyed, The Gloker Mother shed parts of its wings to form Gloker Bishop.
  - Gloker Bishop (グローカービショップ, Gurōkā Bishoppu): The last of the Gloker robots to fight the resistances, it was formed when the Gloker Mother removed several parts of itself to reform into a robot. Despite bearing multiple forms of energy beam attacks, the Gloker Bishop is heavier in size and moves about with verniers underneath its torso. Having defeated Justice Crusher Mode, the Gloker Bishop was faced with the additional help from Cosmos Future Modes, both Ultras proceed to turn the tides of the battle and destroy it with Cross Perfection.
- Gloker Born (グローカーボーン, Gurōkā Bōn): Mass-produced robots compressed from the forms of energy balls, they were tasked in attacking the SRC's Cosmo Noah rocket to prevent any living beings escaping from Earth. Five models appeared in the movie, wherein one was destroyed by Cosmos Eclipse Mode and two others were scrapped by the new Team EYES and Earth monsters. Their main weapon are cannons on both arms and two models can combine into Gloker Rook.
  - Gloker Rook (グローカールーク, Gurōkā Rūku): An elite Gloker robot formed from the combination of two Gloker Borns that survived their fight with Earth resistances. It is capable of leaping from long distances, using retractable blades Rook's Edge (ルークスエッジ, Rūkusu Ejji) on each hands, firing Blair Beam (ブレアビーム, Burea Bīmu) from a hidden mono-eye on its back and uses Rook Cannons (ルークキャノン, Rūku Kyanon) on each shoulders to fire Helmoot Bulb (ヘルムートバルブ, Herumūto Barubu) bullets. Having the upper hand on Earth monsters and Team EYES, a recently redeemed Justice joined the battle and used Crusher Mode to defeat it before destroying Rook with Dagrium Ray.

== Other characters ==
The First Contact

- Yūjirō Haruno (春野 勇次郎, Haruno Yūjirō): Musashi's step-father and the head of a local police station, he strives to become a good parent to his step-son, especially when the boy's encounter of Ultraman Cosmos was greatly dismissed. After believing in his son's tale, Yūjirō would prevent the Sharks commander from opening fire on the Ultra in aftermath of the battle. He made a special appearance in The Blue Planet. He is portrayed by Hidekazu Akai (赤井 英和, Akai Hidekazu).
- Michiko Haruno (春野 みち子, Haruno Michiko): Musashi's biological mother, her sole appearances were in the movie adaptation of Cosmos. She is portrayed by Hitomi Takahashi (高橋 ひとみ, Takahashi Hitomi).
- Mari Kawase (川瀬 マリ, Kawase Mari): Musashi's female classmate, she believed in his story of encountering the Ultraman. Alongside the Baltan child Shirubyi, they cooperate to reclaim Cosmos' pyroxene from the Shark officer and watched as the blue giant saved their town. She is portrayed by Ayumi Uno (宇野 あゆみ, Uno Ayumi) as a child and Miho Nishimura (西村 美保, Nishimura Miho) in latter two movies.
- Tsutomu Sasaki (佐々木 ツトム, Sakaki Tsutomu): Musashi's classmate. In The Blue Planet, he becomes a tourism ambassador in Saipan and married a local woman. He is portrayed by Daisuke Tanaka (田中 大輔, Tanaka Daisuke) in The First Contact and Yasufumi Hayashi (林 泰文, Hayashi Yasufumi) in The Blue Planet.
- Shōji (ショージ): Musashi's second classmate. He returned as a teen in episodes 29 and 30 of Cosmos, and had a disabled younger brother. He also appeared in The Blue Planet as part of a reunion of Musashi's old classmates. He is portrayed by Taiki Ueda (上田 大樹, Ueda Taiki) as a boy and Ryō Nitta (新田 亮, Nitta Ryō) as a young adult.

Ultraman Cosmos

- Sōsuke Nagano (長野 惣介, Nagano Sōsuke; 7): An elementary school student who found a Gamodama. After his classmate saved the resulting Mienin from its Bio-Controller, Nagano and his classmates brought Mienin to a Gamoran. At some point later, the entire class paid a visit to both Mienins in the Kaburaya. He is portrayed by Yusuke Osawa (大澤 佑介, Ōsawa Yūsuke).
- Yūichi Iwata (岩田 裕一, Iwata Yūichi; 9): A young boy who befriended Yamawarawa, but his story was dismissed by the villagers. He is portrayed by Daisuke Kizaki (木崎 大輔, Kizaki Daisuke).
- Yasuhiro Iwata (岩田 康祐, Iwata Yasuhiro; 9): The father of Yūichi, he was also one of the children who befriended Yamawarawa in the past until he moved to Tokyo. Returning to his hometown, Yasuhiro at first dismissed Yūichi's sighting of Yamawarawa until the Yōkai unveil itself as the man quell its anger by reminding Yamawarawa of the parting gift it gave before. He is portrayed by Tamotsu Ishibashi (石橋 保, Ishibashi Tamotsu), who would portray Eisuke Wakura in Ultraman Nexus. As a child, Yasuhiro is portrayed by Noboru Hanzawa (半沢 昇, Hanzawa Noboru)
- Yukari Yoshii (吉井 ユカリ, Yoshii Yukari; 10, 34): Doigaki's junior in the same university. Yukari started to appear since episode 10 and through numerous appearances in the season, she accepted Doigaki's marriage proposal. She is portrayed by Nana Horie (堀江 奈々, Horie Nana).
- Sayaka Fubuki (フブキ・サヤカ, Fubuki Sayaka; 12): Fubuki's late younger sister, who died at an early age of 3 years old. The monster Ephemera's mannerisms reminded Fubuki of Sayaka. She is portrayed by Nonoka Imaizumi (今泉 野乃香, Imaizumi Nonoka).
- Reni Kurosaki (レニ・クロサキ; 13, 14): A female astronaut/construction worker of Germina III space station who was accidentally jettisoned to outer space due to an accident in 2005. Her lifeless body floated in the cold vacuum of outer space until Waroga revived and install a Modulator Biochip into her brain before sending her back to Earth. While being treated in the Treasure Base, she became an unwilling agent of infecting the base's system with computer virus, thus disabling all of Team EYES' technologies in the height of Galbass' assault. After helping Musashi in shutting down a power station and cancelling Galbass' attack, Reni became a leverage for Waroga until she reassured Musashi, allowing Cosmos to kill the invader. Waroga's death however caused Reni to lose her life once more. She is portrayed by Hitomi Miwa (三輪 ひとみ, Miwa Hitomi).
- Akane Tachibana (立花 茜, Tachibana Akane; 16): A young girl whose wish to swim with a whale was ridiculed by her classmates, including Kōta. Her depression caught the attention of Chaos Header, leading to Flywhale-Jilark's creation. She becomes too influenced by the light virus and merged into Chaos Jilark until Kōta apologized to her. The next day, she was greeted by her friends, wishing her a speedy recovery. She is portrayed by Kasumi Takabatake (高畠 華澄, Takabatake Kasumi).
- Kōta Noda (野田 浩太, Noda Kōta; 16): Akane's classmate and the son of a baker. Feeling guilty for his part in embarrassing her, Kōta went to apologize to her, allowing Cosmos to save Akane from Chaos Jilark. He is portrayed by Motoki Ochiai (落合 扶樹, Ochiai Motoki).
- Kagetatsu Nishikida (錦田 景竜, Nishikida Kagetatsu; 18): A samurai that sealed Renki in the Warring States period. He is based on the similarly named character in Ultraman Tiga.
- Shinichi Takekoshi (竹越 真一, Takekoshi Shin'ichi; 18): Mizuki's old chief in her early days of J.A.D.F., his personality changes after the death of his wife from 2002, and eventually retired in the following year. Since the past four years prior, Shinichi has moved to Kono Village with his daughter and was one of the villagers that opposed the construction workers in their attempt to destroy Renki's Katana Ishi. At the same time, he was reunited with Mizuki in her day off, which led to his reconciliation with his daughter Midori. He is portrayed by Arthur Kuroda (黒田 アーサー, Kuroda Āsā).
- Kasumi Sanjōdera (三条寺 カスミ, Sanjōdera Kasumi; 23, 41): A college student born in Friday the 13th and the sole member of her occult club. She was involved into encounters of extraterrestrials, first the Gelworm that trespassed her college and second being the target of Exter Raider. She gave Fubuki the nickname daphnia, as it was his previous life according to her fortune telling. She is portrayed by Mami Shimizu (清水 真実, Shimizu Mami).
- Jun Takasugi (高杉 純, Takasugi Jun; 24): Ayano's childhood friend, he becomes an ikiryō after an accident that render him comatose, which allowed him to perceive Gragas' presence in the city. Due to his current state, his presence is only perceived by Ayano due to their previous encounter in their childhood. He is portrayed by Makoto Kamijo (上條 誠, Kamijō Makoto), previously portraying Amui in Ultraman Tiga Gaiden: Revival of the Ancient Giant.
- Ryōichi Kanō (狩野 良一, Kanō Ryōichi; 26): A salaried worker who becomes a victim of Chaos Header's possession after taking interest on human emotions. When reunited with his son Shōta, this caused instability on Chaos Header Evelease, which gives Cosmos the opening to defeat it at once. He is portrayed by Yoshitaka Zushi (頭師 佳孝, Zushi Yoshitaka).
- Yūki (ユウキ; 29, 30): Shōji's younger brother, and the current owner of Clevergon after inheriting it from Musashi. He is portrayed by Yoshiki Satō (佐藤 慶季, Satō Yoshiki).
- Miyuki Nagare (ナガレ・ミユキ, Nagare Miyuki; 33): Junya's late sister. She is portrayed by Kozue Aiba (相場 梢, Aiba Kozue).
- Kusano Tadao (草野 忠雄, Tadao Kusano; 38): A family man who becomes the host of an Alien Beryl. His lifestyle with the Tadao family gave the alien a change of heart and foil his race's invasion attempt with the help of Cosmos. He is portrayed by Shoichiro Akaboshi (赤星 昇一郎, Akaboshi Shōichirō), who has a son in middle school complimenting him for his guest role in the episode.
- Shunji Horimura (堀村 俊司, Horimura Shunji; 42): A 14-year-old middle school student known for his achievements in science and winning a robot competition. As he was separated from his old friends upon entering middle school, Shunji became insecure to make new friends until his encounter with the alien boy Sol. After their communication went permanently severed, Shunji swears to become an astronaut and meet his extraterrestrial friend in the future, eventually joining the astronaut club as his first step of gaining new friends. He is portrayed by Hisao Takahashi (高橋 寿緒, Takahashi Hisao).
- Kana Morisawa (守沢 佳奈, Morisawa Kana; 54): A young girl in a wheelchair who was protected by Toubles in 1999. Due to Kana's popularity (and notoriety) for befriending the monster, she moved to a different town to live a peaceful life and was devastated when Toubles' presence in 2009 was a result of her selfishness. As she apologized to the monster, Cosmos teleported the girl to Kaburaya Archipelago, allowing Kana to have a proper reunion with Toubles. She is portrayed by Chisato Takada (高田 知里, Takada Chisato) and Kazu Murakami (村上 和, Murakami Kazu) as a child.
- Keizō (敬造; 56) and Shōichi (正一; 56): A pair of elderly villagers in the Kappa Village. They are portrayed by Ken Okabe (岡部 健, Okabe Ken) and Eiichi Kikuchi (きくち 英一, Kikuchi Eiichi), the former was known for his role as Tetsuji Yoshioka of Ultraman Tiga and the latter being Ultraman Jack's suit actor.
- Old Man Tomano (戸間乃老人, Tomano-rōjin; 57): A senior citizen who possesses Gralfan's time door card. Despite his wish to bring Gralfan and relive his memories, he realized that he has been satisfied with his life and entrusted the card to Akatsuki before he disappeared. He was portrayed by Hideyo Amamoto (天本 英世, Amamoto Hideyo).
- Akatsuki (暁; 57): A high school student that befriended Tomano. He is portrayed by Kyōhei Ōyama (大山 恭平, Ōyama Kyōhei).

The Final Battle

- Mio (ミオ): A young girl that Justice encountered during his disguise as Julie. Her attempt to free her dog Cosmos from the rubble served as the final push for Justice regain his faith in humanity. In the hospital television, Mio watched the entire battle of both Ultras against the Gloker forces. She is portrayed by Suzuka Ohgo (大後 寿々花, Ōgo Suzuka), while her dog Cosmos was portrayed by the Hokkaido dog Kai-kun (カイくん).

== Other monsters and aliens ==
Due to Ultraman Cosmos emphasizes upon the themes of peaceful coexistence, the monsters in this work were emphasized in the same way as Earth creatures, both flora and fauna alike instead of elimination threats like the conventional Ultra Series. According to Hideaki Tsuburaya, the idea of monsters coexisting and achieving mutual understanding with humans is partially inspired by the popularity of the anime adaptation of Pokémon with children at that time.

=== Kaburaya Archipelago residents ===
- Friendly Giant Bird Lidorias (友好巨鳥 リドリアス, Yūkō Kyochō Ridoriasu; 1, 2, 30, 55, 65, TFB, Saga): A female giant bird which was already in Kaburaya Archipelago's custody prior to the series and a loyal companion to Musashi. During Chaos Header's first invasion on Earth, Lidorias was subjugated into their first victim of possession until Cosmos saved it. Because of her lingering attachment to Musashi, the giant bird since then made recurring appearances, including a fight against its natural enemy Golmede, saving Cosmos from Chaos Header Mebut, joining forces with Mogrudon and Bolgils to purify Chaos Darkness and lastly participating with three other monster to fight the Glokers. In addition to high speed flight, Lidorias can unleash a beam of energy light. As revealed in Ultraman Saga, Lidorias and her species were among the Earth monsters migrated to Planet Juran as they flourished on the terraformed planet. Lidorias is designed after the benevolent bird Litra from Ultra Q.
  - Chaos Lidorias (カオスリドリアス, Kaosu Ridoriasu; 1, 30): After being infected by the Chaos Header, Lidorias escaped the Kaburaya Archipelago and rampaged on the city. There, her body undergoes mutation (red eyes, long claws and reddish protrusions on neck) to cement the Chaos Header's influence. It was purified by Cosmos as the first monster he fought in 2009. When Lidorias came to protect the defenseless Ultraman, Chaos Header Mebut try to re-infect it but failed due to the monster already developing an antibody of its own.
- Ancient Violent Monster Golmede (古代暴獣 ゴルメデ, Kodai Bōjū Gorumede; 2, 32): A subterranean monster that SRC failed to secure in the past, Golmede is a natural opponent to Lidorias and has the ability to spit fireballs. In the present day the Chaos Header awaken it from slumber as Team EYES try to capture it. When their efforts failed and the monster almost killing Musashi and Shinobu, Lidorias stepped in to fight Golmede before it went to chase Musashi. Cosmos emerged and calmed the monster but the Chaos Header absorbed its life force to create its duplicated, as the latter killed its template cold blooded. Thirty episodes later, another Golmede was mutated into Golmede Beta due to chemical waste from the J.A.D.F.'s weapon factory. It was purified by Cosmos into its original form and relocated to Kaburaya Archipelago, until Golmede and three other monsters escaped six years later in The Final Battle to participate in a campaign against the Gloker robots. In Ultraman Saga, Golmede and its species were among the monsters that relocated to the terraformed Planet Juran.
  - Chaos Golmede (カオスゴルメデ, Kaosu Gorumede; 2): The true purpose of awakening Golmede was for Chaos Header to siphon its life energy and create its twisted duplicate, which sported a pink head protrusion and can unleash a breath of energy stream. The duplicate killed its template and was faced with Cosmos Corona Mode before being killed by Naybuster Ray.
  - Golmede Beta (ゴルメデβ, Gorumede Bēta; 32): As a result of the J.A.D.F.'s weapon factory's waste pollution, Golmede was affected and turned into an unstoppable energy-feeding monster, sporting yellowish color scheme. Having absorbed the firepower from EYES and JADF, Golmede was tricked into exhausting itself by Cosmos, who proceed to undo the mutation with Full Moon Rect. This particular Golmede was confirmed as the one who joined Lidorias, Donron and Bolgils in fighting against the Glokers in The Final Battle.
- Underground Monster Mogrudon (地中怪獣 モグルドン, Chichū Kaijū Mogurudon; 6, 32, 55, 65): Awakened by the microwaves from the subway system, the monster traveled underground and caused earthquake along the way. It was named Mogrudon by Doigaki due to its resemblance to a mole, dolphin and a skipjack tuna. To pull Mogrudon out, Team EYES devised a plan to fish the monster with a tow cable, which Doigaki did through the Tecch Thunder 3. After struggling against its illusion, Cosmos tied Mogrudon with its own tail to pacify the monster before Team EYES brought it to Kaburaya Archipelago. During its stay, Mogrudon found companionship with Bolgils, with the two escaped Kaburaya through underground and join Lidorias and Cosmos in purifying Chaos Darkness into Chaos Header 0. As revealed in Ultraman Saga, Mogrudon was among the Earth monsters that migrated to Planet Juran, where its species flourished and living peacefully with other monsters.
- Meteorite Small Monster Mienin (隕石小珍獣 ミーニン, Inseki Shō Chinjū Mīnin; 7, 32, 55, 64): The Mienin were a pair of short critters manipulated by an unnamed alien race to become Gamoran through the Bio-Controllers (バイオコントローラー, Baio Kontorōrā) and destroy Earth civilization. When angered, they can unleash a surge of electricity beam called Electro Flash (エレクトロフラッシュ, Erekutoro Furasshu). The pair descended to Earth through Gamodama (ガモダマ) meteorites, one of which fell into the possession of an elementary student named Sosuke Nagano. When Doigaki accidentally opened the box, it awakened the Mienins wherein the first one becomes Gamoran, while the other were in the care of Sosuke and his classmates, who smashed the Bio-Controller beforehand. After the first Gamoran was removed from its Bio-Controller, the pair eventually resided within Kaburaya Archipelago for several months before Mitoru kidnapped the second Mienin to become another Gamoran. Like the first one, Cosmos purify it as well after Mitoru deeming the human race passed their test. In The Final Battle, the second Mienin accompanied Ikeyama in restoring Musashi after his defeat and as revealed in Ultraman Saga, the pair had since resumed their life on the terraformed Planet Juran, with one of them communicating with Chaos Header 0. The Mienins are modeled after Pigmon from Ultraman and was meant to be written as a monster in the past which lead to the foundation of SRC.
  - Meteorite Great Monster Gamoran (隕石大怪獣 ガモラン, Inseki Dai Kaijū Gamoran; 7): Once the first Mienin latched with a Bio-Controller on its head, it grew into massive proportions with its red hide turned maroon and gain several abilities, such as supernatural leaping and firing energy beam. It was reverted to its original self when Cosmos opened fire on its Bio-Controller. The Gamoran is based on Garamon from Ultra Q.
  - Meteorite Great Monster Gamoran II (隕石大怪獣 ガモランII, Inseki Dai Kaijū Gamoran Tsū; 55): As part of Mitoru's test to humanity, she kidnapped the second Mienin and convert it into a different Gamoran. With Musashi kidnapped to ensure no interference from the Ultra, Fubuki resort to use the former's idealism by having the first Mienin to calm its fellow brethren. This act of pacifism allows Mitoru to free Musashi as he becomes Cosmos and disable the Bio-Controller on Gamoran II's head.
- Deep-sea Shell Monster Jelga (深海貝獣 ジェルガ, Shinkai Kaijū Jeruga; 15): An undersea monster that feed on plankton and protected by SRC's field generator. Musashi and Fubuki were sent down with their Tecch Diver to fix the generator until Jelga became infected with Chaos Header.
  - Chaos Jelga (カオスジェルガ, Kaosu Jeruga; 15): (Note: Name is not mentioned in the show's credits but written in printed magazines.) The infected form of Jelga. Unlike most Chaos Monsters, Jelga's eyes became slanted while gaining addition abilities of open its shell, firing energy bullets and unleashing energy bullets. After escaping from the monster's clutch, Musashi transforms into Cosmos and fought against the monster. With the help of Fubuki's Tecch Diver, Cosmos Corona Mode expelled the Chaos Header with Corona Extract before killing them with Blazing Wave.
- Blitz Monster Bolgils (電撃怪獣 ボルギルス, Dengeki Kaijū Borugirusu; 20, 32, 55, TFB): An energy-feeding monster that appeared in Paris two months prior and in Shanghai a month after that. It made its way to the SRC Space Development Center to feed on energy until Cosmos appeared and feed Bolgils with 700 years worth of energy to calm the monster. Bolgils was captured and treated within Kaburaya Archipelago. During its stay, the monster found companionship in Mogrudon and the two escaped the archipelago to assist Lidorias and Cosmos in purifying Chaos Darkness into Chaos Header 0. In 2015, Bolgils, Lidorias and Golmede escaped the Kaburaya Archipelago to fight against the Gloker robots while teaming up with the recently reawakened Donron. As revealed in Ultraman Saga, Bolgils migrated to Planet Juran, where its species flourished and peacefully coexist with other monsters.
- Rock Monster Neldrant (岩石怪獣 ネルドラント, Ganseki Kaijū Nerudoranto; 33, 55): A monster which Team EYES tried to secure until Junya Nagare attacked it with his bazooka, blinding the monster on its right eye. In EYES' second attempt to capture, Neldrant was infected into Chaos Neldrant before its purification by Cosmos. Doigaki nursed it to health once the monster relocated to Kaburaya Archipelago.
  - Chaos Neldrant (カオスネルドラント, Kaosu Nerudoranto; 33): The infected form of Neldrant by Chaos Header, which caused the monster to develop reddish protrusions with red eyes, extended claws and capable of spitting fireballs. Cosmos Eclipse Mode uses Cosmium Ray to exorcise the Chaos Header, which briefly took the appearance of Chaos Neldrant's duplicate before destruction.
  - Rock Monster Neldrant II (岩石怪獣 ネルドラントII, Ganseki Kaijū Nerudoranto Tsū; 40): Another Neldrant of different subspecies was awakened after the Chaos Ultraman's fight with Cosmos triggered a special wave. This Neldrant fall prey into Chaos Ultraman's infection and was forced to support him in defeating Cosmos until Doigaki arrived with the Tecch Spinnar to separate the Chaos Header with an antibody missile.
    - Chaos Neldrant II (カオスネルドラントII, Kaosu Nerudoranto Tsū; 40): The infected form of Neldrant II upon Chaos Ultraman's subjugation via his Darkness Wheel. Both monster and Chaos Ultraman team up against Cosmos before Tecch Spinnar exorcised the Chaos Header with an antibody missile.
- Underground Monster Taildass (地底怪獣 テールダス, Chitei Kaijū Tērudasu; 37, 55): A subterranean monster with three pairs of eyes, each were used to determine the brightness in the surface and underground. A year prior, then-rookie Fubuki accidentally fired the experimental explosive NX Bullet which stuck to the monster's hide. In the present day, Taildass resurfaced as Team EYES tried to remove the NX Bomb when Chaos Header took that opportunity to possess the monster. As the NX Bullet was removed, Fubuki defused it while Cosmos purify Taildass before the monster relocated to Kaburaya Archipelago.
  - Chaos Taildass (カオステールダス, Kaosu Tērudasu; 37): The infected form of Taildass, its three eyes on each sides merged into one and grows protrusion on its head. After removing the NX Bullet via Tecch Thunder 4, Musashi transforms into Cosmos and used Eclipse Mode to exorcise the Chaos Header.
- Smuggled Monster Vadata (密輸怪獣 バデータ, Mitsuyu Kaijū Badēta; 50): A pair of juvenile monsters which discovered and smuggled to a pet store by a pair of crooks. Although a juvenile was detained earlier by police forces, the other was brought out by the crook safely and fed with HKP drug. Unbeknownst to him, the Vadata grew at an incredibly fast rate through consumption of drugs and it became 50 meters tall (an adult) in an instant. With the drug still in its body, the Vadata turned wild and managed to escape Tecch Spinnar's confinement as Cosmos appeared and pacify the monsters by expelling the HKP drug's influence. With Vadata purified, the monster thanked the Ultra in gratitude and resided in the Kaburaya Archipelago ever since.
- Clone Monster Toubles (分身怪獣 タブリス, Bunshin Kaijū Taburisu; 54, 55): A non-violent monster that appeared in 1999 after being awakened by the noises of a construction site. Toubles suffered from J.A.D.F.'s attacks but its action in protecting the disabled girl Kana leads to the formation of MITI and SRC. Toubles had since resided in Kaburaya but as a decade had passed, it projected an illusory clone to search the human girl in her former hometown. With Kana wanting to live a normal life, Team EYES was forced to project her hologram to the real monster but their ruse was discovered and the illusory Toubles rampages. Through Cosmos, Kana was able to reach Kaburaya and apologized for her actions as Toubles removed its clone and played with the human girl.

=== Good ===
- Legendary Medicinal Beast Donron (伝説薬使獣 呑龍(ドンロン), Densetsu Yakushi-jū Donron; TFC, TFB): A legendary monster revered by the ancient due to his scale functioning as a traditional medicine. In the present day, Donron was awakened/possessed by Alien Baltan Basical as a test if humanity could coexist with other creatures. The monster was met with opposition from Sharks but the SRC managed to freeze it as Donron return to slumber. 14 years later in The Final Battle, Donron was awakened and joined three other monsters from Kaburaya Archipelago to fight against the Gloker Born armies. Despite being an armless bipedal monster, Donron can burrow itself out from the Earth and exhaling Burning Fire (猛炎烈火, Mōen Rekka).
- Shirubyi (シルビィ; TFC, TBP, TFB): One of the Space Ninja Child Baltans (宇宙忍者 チャイルドバルタン, Uchū Ninja Chairudo Barutan), Shirubyi was tasked in stealing back the Radiant Stone from Sharks but instead of bringing it to Basical, she deliver it to young Musashi after captivated by his will to make peace with the Baltan race. She returned in The Blue Planet to assist the Gyashi aliens in their research and once more in The Final Battle, through which she became a conduit for the donated Future Energy to revive Musashi from a dimensional subspace. She is voiced by Rina Mogami (最上 莉奈, Mogami Rina) in latter two movies.
- Super High-tech Robot Clevergon (スーパーハイテクロボット クレバーゴン, Sūpā Haiteku Robotto Kurebāgon; TFC, 29-31, 44): Originally an abandoned toy that Musashi discovered, Dr. Kensaku modified it into its current state. Clevergon is operated with artificial intelligence, has a built-in computer and satellite dish, capable of levitating on its own, extending its feet and even exorcising the Child Baltan Shirubyi from Mari. Eight years later in the series proper, Musashi was revealed to have given Clevergon to his classmate's disabled younger brother but the two still remained as friends. Gon would later become giant on two occasions, first when under possession of Chaos Header and second by the Doctor XX01 to assist Cosmos in fighting the giant Ghighi. It is voiced by Hiroko Sakurai (桜井 浩子, Sakurai Hiroko), the actress of Akiko Fuji from Ultraman and is designed after Crazygon from Ultra Seven. Gon's reappearance in episode 44 is due to the popularity on its toy sales.
  - Chaos Clevergon (カオスクレバーゴン, Kaosu Kurebāgon; 31): While Musashi was on his way home from polishing Clevergon, the Chaos Header targeted the youth but Gon took the bullet for him. The infected Gon started to attack the SRC Medical Care Base and grows into gigantic proportions, sporting blue vines on his metallic body as a result of Chaos' mutation. While feeding on cars to maintain its giant size, Shinobu disabled Gon for a moment as the Chaos Header's influence reached its bio-chip, so much so that any operation to extract it would risk the robot's own AI. After a moment, Gon was reactivated and proceed on its way to SRC's High Energy Plant. Using Eclipse Mode, Cosmos fired a thin ray of Cosmium Ray into Clevergon's head and precisely destroying Chaos Header's programming. Its attack on SRC Medical Care Base to feed on cars is largely based on Crazygon's attack in his debut.
  - Clevergon Giant (クレバーゴン・ジャイアント, Kurebāgon Jaianto; 44): Through Doctor XX01's size-changing gun, Clevergon was magnified into gigantic proportions to save Cosmos from Ghighi (Progress), allowing the giant to turn the tides of the battle before it was reduced to its original form. Its suit was made by modifying the Chaos Clevergon.
- Friendly Robot Igomas (友達ロボット イゴマス, Tomodachi Robotto Igomasu; 4): A giant toy from the Planet Bibin's toy factory, Igomas was actually a toy which due to be scrapped after its battery was no longer in production. One particular Igomas fell on Earth and found companionship within the three children. After seeing its recall label, the robot went on a rampaging spree out of frustration until Cosmos neutralized and shrunk it to the size of a human toy. In its final moments, Igomas thanked the three children before deactivating from energy depletion. This event inspire them to become scientists in hopes of restoring their robot companion in the future. He is voiced by Hiroshi Ishii. His presence in Ultraman Cosmos was made by Hideyuki Kawakami as a way of including robots into a story based on monster protection.
- Childish Yōkai Yamawarawa (童心妖怪 ヤマワラワ, Dōshin Yōkai Yamawarawa; 9, 36): A Yokai that lived in the mountainous area of Chūbu region, whose presence was passed on by the locals as a folktale. It has a natural protection which allows the monster to be seen only by children and those with pure hearts but can also grow large with extended horns and fangs when angered. Due to its friendly nature with the children, Yamawarawa befriended a boy named Yuichi and grew large after the injured boy was about to be taken by Team EYES. While fighting Cosmos, Yamawarawa's anger was quelled by Yuichi's father, Yasuhir, who also befriended the Yokai as a child. At some point of time, Yamawarawa hitched a ride to Okuhidaka Village by accident through a delivery truck. Despite an initial misunderstanding with the locals, the Yokai found itself fighting against Mahagenom again and with the help of Cosmos, it managed to reseal the evil spirit before marching its way back to its mountain. Yamawarawa's appearance and episode debut (9) is based on the theme of children growing up into an adult. Its return in episode 36 is due to the Yokai's popularity with the filming staff members.
- Planetary Guardian Beast Parastan (遊星守護獣 パラスタン, Yūsei shugo-jū Parasutan; 21, TBP): A sphinx-like monster that guarded Planet Juran (遊星ジュラン, Yūsei Juran), she was possessed by the Chaos Header and steer her planet off from the orbit before Cosmos chased her away and corrected the Juran's orbit. In the present day, Parastan set Juran into a collision course with Earth before Cosmos saved her. Once diverting Juran from crashing Earth, Parastan thanked the Ultra and took her leave. In The Blue Planet, Parastan was killed during the invasion from Scorpus race her planet turned into a barren wasteland. Through the science of Alien Gyashi, Musashi and the SRC members managed to restore Juran to life as it became the migration area of Earth monsters in Ultraman Saga. Meanwhile, the redeemed Chaos Header and Cosmos became the defender of Juran in her absence.
  - Planetary Monster Chaos Parastan (遊星怪獣 カオスパラスタン, Yūsei Kaijū Kaosu Parasutan; 21, 22): The infected form of Parastan upon subjugation into Chaos Header's possession. As a result, Chaos Parastan had been targeting space ships of various alien races and steer Juran off from its orbit before she was thwarted by Cosmos. In the present day, she intercepted SRC member Mitsuya's Waltz, Ultraman Cosmos and the rescuing party Team EYES as the blue Ultra exorcised Parastan from Chaos Header.
  - Chaos Parastan S (カオスパラスタンS(サブスタンス), Kaosu Parasutan Sabusutansu; 22): After being exorcised by Cosmos, the Chaos Header reformed into Chaos Parastan's clone in a last resort tactic. This particular clone retains all the same appearance, save for its horns being longer. It was destroyed by Cosmos Corona Mode's Naybuster Ray.
- Space Monster Zaranga (宇宙怪獣 ザランガ, Uchū Kaijū Zaranga; 27): A pregnant space monster which came to Earth in hopes of finding the ocean and giving birth to her child safely, multiple monsters of her kind said to have done this several times in the past, which was recorded in the Edo period. In the present day, her trajectory was diverted to land due to the fireworks as she gave Team EYES and Cosmos a hard time before being put to sleep. Once awakened, Zaranga marched her way to the sea but to make matters worse, her body temperature rises from overheating and grant the monster the ability to shoot fireballs. Cosmos finally bring the monster to the sea, allowing her child's birth being carried out safely. The family pair would depart on Earth on good terms. Zaranga's appearance and her episode was proposedby producer Hiroyasu Shibuya as a commemoration to the New Year's Day of 2002.
  - Space Monster Baby Zaranga (宇宙怪獣 ベビーザランガ, Uchū Kaijū Bebī Zaranga; 27): Zaranga's newborn infant. Like its mother, it can also fly on energy propulsion.
- Space Boy Sol (宇宙少年 ソル, Uchū Shōnen Soru; 42): (Note: Also written as Space Boy Sol (異星の少年 ソル, Isei no Shōnen Soru).) An alien boy with a white skin tone while wearing a robe to cover his true appearance. He and his biologist father travels to study the benevolent space monster Delgoran into various planets and star system, hence he regarded the monster as its sole friend. When Delgoran was possessed by the Chaos Header, Sol lost both his father and spaceship, leaving him stranded on the small planet Satellite Putiwar (衛星プティワール, Eisei Putiwāru). After a strange meteor approached Earth's orbit, his ship's computer managed to contact the human boy Shunji as they became fast friends. Sol managed to catch Musashi's attention and sought his help in purifying Delgoran before the meteor went out of Earth's orbit, cutting off his communication with Shunji for good. Sol is voiced by Mami (摩味). His ship was recycled from the NSP Campanella from Ultraman Dyna and an entire room was constructed for its pod/Sol's living space.
- Comet Monster Delgoran (彗星怪獣 デルゴラン, Suisei Kaijū Derugoran; 42): A harmless space monster that traverse from one star to another and befriended Sol and his father. Upon corruption by Chaos Header, Delgoran raced towards Earth until it was purified by Cosmos Eclipse Mode.
  - Chaos Delgoran (カオスデルゴラン, Kaosu Derugoran; 42): The infected form of Chaos Header, Delgoran's face sported five eyes and can spit energy bullets from its mouth. After killing Sol's father and leaving the boy stranded in Satellite Putiwar, Delgoran raced to Earth by avoiding EYES' Tecch Booster and grew a pair of hands. Cosmos purify the monster back to its original form through Cosmium Ray.
- Extradimensional Being Ghighi Doctor (異次元人 ギギ・ドクター, Ijigen-jin Gigi Dokutā; 44): A female Ghighi known for her code XX01, she was among the scientists that opposed the Ghighi soldiers in invading other planets to solve their overpopulation problem. She encountered Sawaguchi in her log cabin, giving her wedding ring as a sign of trust as they were joined by Hiura and Musashi to stop the Ghighi's second invasion attempt. With her mission ended, she bid farewell to the humans and leave in her kind's portal, having found a suitable dimension for her kind to populate. Like the soldier Ghighis, XX01 can self levitate and using size-changing gun. She also had a translator that placed onto her chest, giving the masculine voice which caused Hiura to mistook her for a male Ghighi. Like all Ghighi as well, she is voiced by Moriya Endo.
- Legendary Yōsei Mugera (伝説妖精 ムゲラ, Densetsu Yōsei Mugera; 45): Actually an alien from Planet Rekuria (レクリア星, Rekuria-sei) of N66 Star System, who has the intelligence of an elementary school student. He was accidentally left behind by his fellow brethren on the Japanese amusement park Fantasy Land (ファンタジーランド, Fantajī Rando) and becomes an urban legend among children where he fix their broken toys and even heals them through his power. His race came to pick him up with their planet's saucer, Pleasure Park (プレジャーパーク, Purejā Pāku), which lead to a slight misunderstanding between them and the J.A.D.F. before Cosmos neutralized both threats. On the day of the amusement park's closure, Mugera bids farewell as he finally reunited with his comrades. He is voiced by Junko Shimakata (嶋方 淳子, Shimakata Junko), previously voicing Junk in Gridman the Hyper Agent. The filming location of Fantasy Land was the Mukōgaoka amusement park, which coincidentally ceased its operation in March 2002.
- Purification Alien Alien Curia (浄化宇宙人 キュリア星人, Jōka Uchūjin Kyuria Seijin; 46): An alien whose spaceship crash landed on Kirigakure Village (霧隠村, Kirigakure-mura), he had been living with the villagers under the human form Yamano (山野) for as long as 300 years. In the present day, the Space Plant Abtoshia (宇宙植物 アブトシア, Uchū Shokubutsu Abutoshia) grew into that village after its meteorite fell. Due to its hazardous pollen, Curia utilized his Breeze Power (ブリーズパワー, Burīzu Pawā) to neutralize them but his ability becomes weaker and turned berserk within each turn, so much so that he begged Musashi/Cosmos to end his life. In the next day, Curia turned berserk as Cosmos Eclipse Mode purify the alien and expels the Abtoshia altogether, allowing Curia to resume living as Yamano. He is portrayed by Eisuke Tsunoda (角田 英介, Tsunoda Eisuke), known for his role as Michifumi Inoue in Ultraman Gaia.
- Peaceful Civilization People Alien Koishis "June" (平和文明人 コイシス星人 ジュネ, Heiwa Bunmei-jin Koishisu Sejin June; 52): An alien girl who travels to Planet Sreiyu with her monster companion Zaggel. As they crash landed on Earth due to an accident on their way back, June was forced to create a special barrier for both the monster and herself. Due to a misconception about Earth and believing that Cosmos is a malevolent entity, she stole the Cosmo Pluck from Musashi until he cleared up the entire matter. After seeing Team EYES and Cosmos' effort to save Zaggel, she gained her trust on said planet and thanked Musashi before leaving on her kind's ship. She is portrayed by Shiori Kanzaki (神崎 詩織, Kanzaki Shiori).
- Partner Monster Zaggel (パートナー怪獣 ザゲル, Pātonā Kaijū Zageru; 52): June's monster companion, who also stuck on Earth after a crash landing during their trip back to Planet Koishis. Like June, Earth atmosphere is hazardous to Zaggel as they were contained inside a special barrier, which will run out of power. After hearing this story, Team EYES offered their help to fix it but an accident caused by crashing a cable linked to a pair of transmission towers caused the barrier to break apart and turned Zaggel into a rampant. Cosmos stepped in and fix the bubble long enough for the Planet Koishis saucer to pick both Zaggel and June to their home.
- Future Monster Arados (未来怪獣 アラドス, Mirai Kaijū Aradosu; 53): A time travelling monster from 5000 years into the future. One particular Arados is an infant which became sick due to the current atmosphere. Its presence caught the attention of Alien Noir and JADF, each wanted the monster for its chronokinesis. When the Noir aliens made their move by sending Ragstone Mechalator, Arados used the last of its energy to banish the cyborg monster into an alternate dimension as Cosmos killed the aliens in their saucer. While Musashi and Hiura were paying their respect to the deceased infant, three adult Arados appeared and restore their child from the dead as it rejoin them in their time travel. Due to their chronokinesis, the Arados can travel through time by itself or creating time portals. They can also reverse the time of a certain target, which they did to resurrect the infant Arados from the dead.
- Kappa Kawanoji (河童 かわのじ; 56): A Kappa that befriended the locals of Torikawa village, it attacked a quartet of youngsters that try to injure Keizō and Shōichi. Aside from its love for cucumbers, sumo and sake, Kawanoji carried a bottle gourd to replenish his plate whenever it dried to replenish its strength. After a misunderstanding that lead to an officer firing the Kappa, Kawanoji becomes large until Cosmos calmed it with a sumo match. After the incident, Kawanoji decided to visit Keizō at the local hospital. Kawanoji and his episode is inspired by director Muraishi's visit to Tōno, Iwate while filming for Ultraman Cosmos episode 18.
- Legendary Holy Beast Gralfan (伝説聖獣 グラルファン, Densetsu Seijū Gurarufan; 57): A monster that resided in a time door card in Tomano's possession, it was summoned through an old music, causing the Kisaragi Town to experience snow despite it being summer. At night, Gralfan caused the time to stop but Tomano, Akatsuki, Ayano and Musashi managed to persist due to covering their eyes from Gralfan's light. Although it relived Tomano's past memory, he refused to enter it as Ayano, Akatsuki and Cosmos managed to bring the monster back to the time door card. Tomano as well disappeared as a consequence from bringing Gralfan to reality. Although the episode took place in summer, filming was done during the winter period of Japan.
- Ancient Monster Dolba (古代怪獣 ドルバ, Kodai Kaijū Doruba; 62): A subspecies of Galbass which became a victim for possession by Chaos Header when Team EYES and JADF collaborate in an attempt to fight the Chaos Header particles on Earth. Once freed by Cosmos, Dolba return the favor by headbutting Chaos Ultraman Calamity, long enough for JADF to give their support and Cosmos to finish off his doppelganger.
  - Chaos Dolba (カオスドルバ, Kaosu Doruba; 62): The result of Dolba being possessed by Chaos Header, causing its head to be mutated. Dolba was used as a distraction against Team EYES until Cosmos purify it again.
- Nature Aliens Alien Gyashi (ネイチュア宇宙人 ギャシー星人, Neichua Uchūjin Gyashī Seijin; TBP, TFB): An aquatic human-like alien race whose planet fell victim to Sandloss and his Scorpus' attack. They resided on Earth for temporary protection while researching a way to rebuild life on their planet. Once Sandloss was defeated by Cosmos and Justice, their research became successful and heads off to resurrect their planet. This same research is also given to Musashi as a token of appreciation, which the youth would use to restore Planet Juran. In The Final Battle, Jin and Shau returned to Earth in 2015 to restore Musashi back through their Future Energy. They also witnessed Ultraman Legend's arrival, to which they refer as a legend from their race's culture. The Gyashi aliens have the ability to turn the lower parts of their torso into mermaids to swim and can even impersonate a human being. They can also merge with a monster (Rayja) to empower them and participate in a battle against gigantic opponents.
  - Jin (ジーン, Jīn): The leaders of Alien Gyashi, Jin harbors a hatred for humanity except Mari until Musashi convinced him otherwise. Aside from assisting SRC in Project Blue, Jin assimilated with a Rayja to become Rayja J (sporting a red indicator on its forehead) and fought against the Scorpus but was easily defeated in a cornered attack. He is portrayed by Masatoshi Matsuo (松尾 政寿, Matsuo Masatoshi).
  - Shau (シャウ): A female Gyashi who was quick to trust humanity in contrast to her leader. By merging with a Rayja, she transforms them into Rayja S, sporting a blue indicator on their forehead. She is portrayed by Mai Saitō (斉藤 麻衣, Saitō Mai), previously portraying Lisa Nanase in Ultraman Gaia: The Battle in Hyperspace.
- Undersea Monster Rayja (海底怪獣 レイジャ, Kaitei Kaijū Reija; TBP): Giant stingrays that inhabited the Saipan seabed, they were among the fighting forces in against Scorpus' invasion on Earth. Through Alien Gyashi Shau and Jin's possessions, the Rayjas became humanoid and sported indicators on their forehead, allowing them to participate on land combat and fighting on equal terms against the space invaders. The Scorpus outnumber them until Musashi transforms into Cosmos Eclipse Mode.

=== Evil ===
- Chaos Bug (カオスバグ, Kaosu Bagu; 5): A Chaos Monster born from the Chaos Header infecting illegal dumping sites from Hotarugamura in Gunma Prefecture (Fubuki's hometown), causing them to feed upon energies and vehicles. While appearing as fireflies, they were in truth smaller pieces of junk given sentience. One of their target was Musashi and Fubuki in their Shepherd until the former deactivated said car. Once their operation discovered, they absorb the firepower from Tecch Thunder and became the Chaos Bug. Due to the infection victim being inanimate objects, Cosmos fail to exorcise it and instead uses Naybuster Ray to finish the monster. Chaos Bug was proposed by Hideyuki Kawakami as an entirely malevolent opponent for Cosmos Corona Mode to fight, while its merger with inorganic substance is an inherited plot from episode 4. The skull motif at the back of its head is purposely invoked as a sign that the monster was entirely evil.
- Bronze Demon Geshoot (青銅魔神 ゲシュート, Seidō Majin Geshūto; 10): A bronze statue from the West Asia, which was known to destroy a civilization in the past and was sealed in an airtight one-way mirror container. Its true origin was from outer space, which was delivered by an unknown alien race to relieve the stresses of human beings in the ancient times. Geshoot was discovered and brought to Treasure Base of SRC. The statue is capable of absorbing stresses from others but this caused it to gain sentience and grows into monstrous size by absorbing other's stresses. As a monster, Geshoot turned its victims into barbaric and almost caused Fubuki to do the same until Cosmos appeared. Geshoot try to attack Cosmos with the same beam but the Ultra absorbed said attack and reflected to the statue, causing it to explode and regressed back into its original figure. The Geshoot statue was sealed in the container once more to be returned to the ruins it came from. Geshoot and its entire appearance is a whole plot reference to the tenth episode of Booska! Booska!!, which featured a stress-relieving balloon.
- Evil Space Life Form Waroga (邪悪宇宙生命体 ワロガ, Jaaku Uchū Seimei-tai Waroga; 13, 14, 48): An evil alien who aimed for the invasion of Earth. For that sake, he rescued and resurrected Reni Kurosaki when her lifeless body floated in the cold vacuum of space. Appearing on Earth during the year 2009, he sent the girl and manipulated Galbass with the Modulator Biochip (変調機バイオチップ, Henchō-ki Baiochippu) to sow distrust of monsters to humanity, before making them fighting among each other's for his kind to invade. When Galbass started to attack, he sent a virus through Reni's Biochip, which hacks through Team EYES' machinery and defeated Cosmos. Later that night, Waroga fought against Cosmos when Galbass was reverted to normal. With Waroga killed by Cosmos Corona Mode's Blazing Wave, Reni's Biochip disabled as she died shortly after. Another Waroga appeared months later in order to avenge its brethren and took over Cosmos' body. This particular Waroga issued challenge letters to JADF and SRC at night, as well as targeting Musashi for his connection to the Ultra. In his second attack on SRC Medical Care Base, Waroga fought against every available forces, which eventually reduced to vice captain Shinobu of EYES and Bengals captain Oka of JADF before being killed in the same way as his brethren by Cosmos. The Waroga's main ability is to fire Arms Shot (アームスショット, Āmusu Shotto) via his Sword Punch Arms (ソードパンチアーム, Sōdo Panchi Āmu) and is known to be nocturnal, which Team EYES exploited against its second brethren.
  - Chaos Waroga (カオスワロガ, Kaosu Waroga; FER): Waroga's infected form by the Chaos Header, appearing in the eleventh stage of Ultraman Fighting Evolution Rebirth. Upon losing to Cosmos, Waroga received empowerment from Chaos Header but retain his free will. His Sword Punch Arms becomes spear-like weapons named Assault Arms (アサルトアームス, Asaruto Āmusu), allowing him to fire Assault Arms Shot (アサルトアームズショット, Asaruto Āmusu Shotto). His strongest attack is Beam Rain (光線雨, Kōsen Ame), transforming into an energy ball that shoots rays in every directions. After the Chaos Header was purged, Waroga becomes a wormhole that traps Cosmos within Alien Mefilas' dimension.
- Flywhale Jilark (フライホエールジラーク, Furaihoēru Jirāku; 16): The illusion of a giant whale created by Chaos Header from Akane's negative emotions. During the night, Jilark became infected by the Chaos Header and merged with Akane into Chaos Jilark.
  - Spirit Parasite Monster Chaos Jilark (精神寄生獣 カオスジラーク, Seishin Kisei-jū Kaosu Jirāku; 16): A Chaos Monster born from the fusion of illusory Flywhale Jilark and Akane through the Chaos Header. Feeding on the little girl's hatred for her classmate, it fought against Cosmos until Kouta apologized for his actions, causing Chaos Jilark to lose grip of her. This allows Cosmos to extract her safely while the Chaos Monster dissipated from her absence. Episode 16 writer Keiichi Hasegawa envisions the entire episode's plot as a reference to Yapool from Ultraman Ace, who haunted the human hearts during his active period on Earth.
- Extradimensional Beings Ghighi (異次元人 ギギ, Ijigen-jin Gigi; 17, 44): The Ghighis are extradimensional aliens who suffered from overpopulation. The soldier type are consist of the generic trio Ghighi A (blue eye), B (yellow eyes) and C (red eye). First appearing in episode 17, they shrank Sawaguchi, her two assistants, Hiura and Musashi in order to explain their invasion goals by using Earth as their new home while the humans shrunk and kept in a small maze. Cosmos managed to save the humans as the three Ghighis fused into a giant. In episode 44, another trio of Ghighi try to continue their predecessor's invasion attempt, only to be thwarted by the very same humans and XX01 of the scientist type. Through their translators, the Ghighis are voiced by Moriya Endo (遠藤 守哉, Endō Moriya). They are designed after the Dada from Ultraman and their geometric patterns were implemented by director Muraishi, since the episode 17's plot has elements of maze. Only two suits and four different helmets were produced.
  - Three-faced Extradimensional Being Ghighi (三面異次元人 ギギ, Sanmen Ijigen-jin Gigi; 17): The trio soldier Ghighi's combined giant form, while relatively the same as their diminutive forms, their head is divided with three faces of their components, but is also their weak point. Each sides of faces are capable of rapid firing tricolor eye beams called Three-faced Destructive Ray Firing (三面破壊光線連射, Sanmen Hakai Kōsen Rensha). The Tecch Thunder aircraft discover this and diving attack from above, causing instability among the components for Cosmos to shoot Naybuster Ray. Its three-faced head is based on the Dada's ability to change his face.
  - Three-faced Extradimensional Being Ghighi (Progress) (三面異次元人 ギギ（プログレス）, Sanmen Ijigen-jin Gigi (Puroguresu); 44): An upgraded variant of the previous giant Ghighi, the combined form's head is protected by an energy dome to compensate their previous weakness. They can also split back into the three components while retaining their giant size, using Graviton Beam (グラビトンビーム, Gurabiton Bīmu) to trap others in mid-air. After the Clevergon Giant freed Cosmos, Ghighi Progress caught in a beam war between their Signal Blaster (シグナルブラスター, Shigunaru Burasutā) and Cosmos' Naybuster Ray before he was defeated for good.
- Onryōki Renki (怨霊鬼 戀鬼; 18): A giant onryō samurai born from the grudges of star-crossed lovers, a young lord and a princess from opposing sides during the Warring States period of Japan. After committing suicide, their unrest spirit failed to ascend to afterlife and formed Renki to attack the warring soldiers until Kagetatsu appeared and seal him in the Katana Ishi (刀石) at Mount Nibito of Kono Village. In the present day, the seal was undone by a local developer, causing Renki to go on a rampaging spree. As Renki was intangible for a spirit and is armed with Onryō Sword (怨霊剣, Onryō Ken), Cosmos assumed Corona Mode and utilized lightning bolt to attack him. A weakened Renki tried to continue the fight until Shinobu told the onryō of the hardships of a loving couple, allowing the deceased couple's spirit to pass on to afterlife. Renki is portrayed by Tadashi Katsumata (勝亦 正, Katsumata Tadashi), who was appointed due to his swordsmanship. For his voice, Katsumata's lines were dubbed over with the voice actress Miho Aoyama (青山 美帆, Aoyama Miho) to emphasize Renki's origin as a pair of couple. The samurai armor worn by Renki was never a part of the suit, as director Muraishi borrowed it from a certain period drama.
- Emotion Incarnate Monster Angrilla (情念化身獣 アングリラ, Jōnen Keshin-jū Angurira; 19): A horrid monster born from Reda's grief over his dead lover Reka and rampaged across the warehouse district in southwest city. When Reka's spirit managed to quell her lover's anger, Angrilla became weakened as it disappear from Cosmos' Full Moon Rect.
- Electromagnetic Demon Beast Gragas (電磁魔獣 グラガス, Denji Majū Guragasu; 24): A demonic being from outer space, whose purpose is to feed on electromagnetic waves and caused disruption among electricity. The monster remained invisible, as his presence was perceived by the ikiryo Jun until Tecch Thunder 4 unleashed the Amorphus Wave that exposed its appearance. Guided by Jun, Ayano used his crystal to open fire on Gragas. The monster try to deceive Cosmos into a feigned surrender before the Ultra opened fire with Blazing Wave. Gragas was designed in reference to Moruvaia from Ultraman Dyna. Despite its lack of origin, producer Hiroyasu Shibuya believed that Gragas was previously sealed due to numerous bad deeds in the past.
- Legendary Demon Mahagenom (伝説悪鬼 マハゲノム, Densetsu Akki Mahagenomu; 36): An evil spirit which was remembered as Mahagera (マハゲラ) by the locals of Okuhidaka Village (奥日高村, Okuhidaka-mura), he was previously sealed by Yamawarawa in the ancient times, until it was released in the present day. Mahagenom was met with attacks from the J.A.D.F. Bengals squad's tanks and retreated to the Okuhidaka Village, where it resumed rampaging until Yamawarawa sealed it again with Cosmos' help.
- Infiltration Alien Alien Beryl (潜入宇宙人 ベリル星人, Sen'nyū Uchūjin Beriru Seijin; 38): A race of invaders from Planet Beryl, Magellan Nebula (マゼラン星雲, Mazeran Seiun) of S13 Star System, which appeared as human hearts. Two operatives sneaked into the human society by possessing two different people, an unnamed policeman and a family man Tadao Kusano. The alien that possessed Tadao however had a change of heart after experience the human's peaceful life as he saved Musashi by killing his companion and told Cosmos of Helzzking's weakness. With the battle ended, the lone alien departed from Earth to face his punishment for treachery, but is otherwise grateful for his experience on Earth.
- Invasion Transforming Mecha Helzzking (侵略変形メカ ヘルズキング, Shinryaku Henkei Meka Heruzukingu; 38): The Alien Beryl's invasion weapon, first appeared as a tetrapod-like saucer that feed on energies from the SRC's power plant before gaining a robot mode upon full power absorption. The entire robot is built on the hardened mineral Beryl Ore (ベリル鉱石, Beriru Kōseki) and Helzzgun (ヘルズガン, Heruzugan) on each arms. Guided by "Kusano", Cosmos Corona Mode constantly strike the robot's throat (its weak point), causing Helzzking to go haywire before being scrapped by Blazing Wave. Helzzking's fight was meant to emphasize the gunfights from western movies.
  - Anti-Chaos Header Extermination Weapon Alt-Helzzking (対カオスヘッダー殲滅兵器 ヘルズキング改, Tai Kaosu Heddā Senmetsu Heiki Heruzukingu Kai; 61): At some point of time, the J.A.D.F. reconstructed Helzzking as a purple colored variant from its remains for their fighting force. The Helzzguns were replaced with Soagg Beam Cannons (ソアッグビーム砲, Soaggu Bīmu-hō) and displayed a tremendous skill just in its experimental display. Although meant as an anti-Chaos Header weapon, its original programming resurface and this caused Helzzking go beyond their control as Cosmos and Team EYES interfered. Despite Saijo's plea that Helzzking would be a beneficial weapon, both Ultra and Team EYES destroy it by exploiting a crack on its throat. Helzzking's return was a proposal from director Ichino and writer Masuda.
- Assault Android Exter Raider (強襲アンドロイド エクステル・レイダー, Kyōshū Andoroido Ekusuteru Reidā; 41): (Note: In the show, he is credited as Planet Exter Android (エクステル星のアンドロイド, Ekusuteru-sei no Andoroido).) An android hunter whose tasked in hunting the remnants of Alien Greenbelt. He has been targeting Platea and later Kasumi due to the Greenbelt seed implanted within her before being incapacitated. Unable to carry the deed, Exter sent the distress code towards Sydevakter to continue his hunt before deactivating. He is portrayed by Kōichi Sugisaki (杉崎 浩一, Sugisaki Kōichi).
- Destroyer Transformable Machine Sydevakter (破滅可変マシン サイドバクター, Hametsu Kahen Mashin Saidobakutā; 41): Exter Raider's transportation and a robot under the form of a space ship. When Exter was deactivated, Sydevakter went to continue its master's deed by hunting Kasumi for her Greenbelt seed and was killed by Cosmos Corona Mode's Naybuster Ray. Aside from energy beam from its head, the robot is built with a durable metal Steel Vact (スティールバクト, Sutīru Bakuto) to survive laser shots and melee attacks without a flinch. It was designed as a sleeker and mechanical counterpart to Helzzking from episode 38.
- Symbiotic Space Life Form Giribanes (共生宇宙生命体 ギリバネス, Kyōsei Uchū Seimei-tai Giribanesu; 47): A dimorphic space life form which combine through symbiotic relationship. Their race are actually remain unnamed for the rest of their presence, since "Giribanes" is a term coined by Doigaki. A Giribanes pair was sent to fight the Ultraman on Earth while the rest of its kind prepare to invade the planet with a fleet of spaceships. When Banes died and Giri committed suicide, the alien fleet retreated.
  - Humanoid Alien Giri (人型宇宙人 ギリ, Hito-gata Uchūjin Giri; 47): The humanoid alien with a pair of Cut Hooks (カットフック, Katto Fukku) for its weapons. He was named by Doigaki after his ability to slice buildings. When combined into Giribanes, Giri obtains aerial combat proficiency while his partner feed on his blood. With Banes shot down by Fubuki's Tecch Spinnar 2, Giri lost his motivation to fight and committed suicide.
  - Hematophagy Banes (吸血生物 バネス, Kyūketsu Seibutsu Banesu; 47): A wing-like alien who latched herself to Giri to provide him the means for flight, in exchange feeding on his blood. Aside from that, she can also fly on her own and firing beams from each sides of her eyes but risk vulnerability to opponents. She was named Banes by Doigaki after the Japanese word for wings. Assuming the human guise of Fubuki's missing in action pilot friend Ai Misaki (ミサキ・アイ, Misaki Ai), she tried to trick Fubuki into surrendering her Team EYES' data for her kind to invade Earth but her plot was foiled, which lead her to quickly recombine with Giri. As Giribanes try to escape, Fubuki in his Tecch Spinnar 2 open fire and reducing Banes to pieces. She is portrayed by Nami Ishibashi (石橋 奈美, Ishibashi Nami).
  - Symbiotic Space Life Form Giraggas (共生宇宙生命体 ギラッガス, Kyōsei Uchū Seimei-tai Giraggasu; 58): A pair of aliens from Giribanes' subspecies who wished to avenge the former's death by conquering Earth alone. Like Giribanes as well, they are unnamed and the Giraggas term is a derogatory of sort towards their kind's outcasts, their clan having gave up the intention of conquering Earth. Being a simple color swap to Giribanes, the Giraggas retain their weapons and abilities. The pair's human form were said to be based on a stereotype yakuza couple from Japanese movies, as director Harada chose both Junichi and Nami due to their participation in Harada's early project.
    - Humanoid Space Life Form Giraggas M (人型宇宙生命体 ギラッガスM, Hitogata Uchū Seimei-tai Giraggasu Emu; 58): A blue-colored subspecies of Giri who came to Earth to avenge Giribanes' death by conquering it. Despite Musashi's attempt for a peaceful negotiation, the appearance of J.A.D.F. soldiers brought a misunderstanding to the blue alien as he rampaged until F brought him away from Earth as he finally agreed to return to their tribe. His human form, the man in blue clothes (青い服の男, Aoi Fuku no Otoko), is portrayed by Junichi Kawamoto (川本 淳市, Kawamoto Jun'ichi).
    - Wing-type Life Form Giraggas F (羽根型生物 ギラッガスF, Hane-gata Seibutsu Giraggasu Efu; 58): A subspecies of Banes, she has no interest in invading Earth but accompanied M due to her devotion and loyalty. As Cosmos try to stop the fight between M and the J.A.D.F. forces, F came up with a solution to recombine with M and finally pursuing him to leave Earth on good terms. Her disguise, the female alien (女性エイリアン, Josei Eirian) is portrayed by Nami Ishibashi, previously portraying Banes' disguise as Ai Misaki.
- Infernal Warrior Kyrieloid (炎魔戦士 キリエロイド, Enma Senshi Kirieroido; FER): An extradimension being from episode 3 of Ultraman Tiga. Kyrieloid fled from his fight with Tiga into a cavern, where his desire for power was realized by Chaos Header.
  - Chaos Kyrieloid (カオスキリエロイド, Kaosu Kirieroido; FER): Desiring to become stronger, Kyrieloid becomes infected by the Chaos Header and gain a massive power up to his form. He has blades on his knee joints, giving Kyrieloid proficient kicking skills in addition to attacks such as Hellish Flame (炎魔地獄, Enma Jigoku) and Drill Combo Kick (ドリルコンボキック, Doriru Konbo Kikku). He kills an injured Gomora, causing Tiga to retaliate by defeating the mutated fiend.

=== Neutral ===
- Frilled-neck Monster Supittol (襟巻怪獣 スピットル, Erimaki Kaijū Supittoru; 3): A subterranean gentle monster themed after a frilled-neck lizard, it has an enhanced hearing despite being nocturnal. Its eggs were situated underneath the landfill and mistook the airplane take off for incoming enemies, hence surfacing to guard its nest. When Musashi was about to fire an anesthesia missile, Supittol became provoked and fired upon the team. Sometime later, Supittol try to attack the airplanes and was met with opposition from Team EYES. As Cosmos get a hold of the monster, Fubuki's Tecch Thunder 1 fired the anesthesia missile to render the monster out cold. Its ability to conceal its head in a frill, which can also open itself is based on the structural changes of Chaos Monsters while excluding the entity's own presence in its debut episode.
- Skeletal Dinosaur Moodon (骨格恐竜 ムードン, Kokkaku Kyōryū Mūdon; 11): Originally the fossil of an extinct dinosaur species named Muranocraphdon (ムラノクラフドン, Muranokurafudon), this particular fossil was left behind after most of its family members were excavated by the construction workers. Energy reaction from the Chaos Header caused a single Muranocraphdon to be reanimated into an exoskeletal monster whose presence disrupted the construction site. As part of their assignments before summer break, Team EYES was sent to remove it from the tunnel, which Ayano dubbed it as Moodon from the English word "Don't move". After a series of attempts, the construction worker detonated the mine with their dynamite, which caused Moodon to surface. Cosmos faced against it and was stabbed on his gut until Ayano figured out to lure Moodon with a caricature of her child. Cosmos animated the caricature as Moodon peacefully passed on and her body disintegrated into dust.
- Short-lived Cub Ephemera (薄命幼獣 イフェメラ, Hakumei Yōjū Ifemera; 12): An asexual mayfly monster hatched from an egg within the span of 500 years and has the lifespan of an entire day. A single Ephemera was born and demolished buildings to build a nest for its single egg but was threatened by J.A.D.F.'s assaults. With Fubuki and Cosmos protected the monster, Ephemera died once its life force ended while the egg was put under the care of Kaburaya Archipelago. The episode's writer Takegami cited an antlion as a source of image inspiration.
- Ancient Monster Galbass (古代怪獣 ガルバス, Kodai Kaijū Garubasu; 13): A monster which Waroga implanted with a Modulator Biochip on its brain. Despite being known to be a gentle monster, high frequency sounds caused by the turbine of an energy plant triggered a reaction on its Modulator Biochip to turn Galbass into a rampant. It spits fireballs and defeated Cosmos, which the Waroga expected to use in order to sow discord among humanity into making them at war with each others. In its second appearance at night, Galbass try to attack a second energy plant before Musashi and Reni deactivated it, which caused Galbass to be freed from the Biochip's control as Cosmos protected the monster at a last minute.
- TK Galaxy People Alien Migelon (TK銀河人 ミゲロン星人, Tī Kei Ginga-jin Migeron Seijin; 19): A pair of alien lovers Reda (レダ) and Reka (レカ), their spaceship accidentally caught in a firing range of the abandoned satellite Angelica. Having survived the incident, Reda went to Earth and enact his revenge by manipulating Ayano into hacking the satellite and program it on a collision course against SRC's Germina III. While sending Angrilla to attack Cosmos, Reda was confronted by Reka's spirit in Ayano, who wished to stop him from provoking a war between both human and the Migelon race. Realizing the errors of his ways, Reda used the last of his energy to steer Angelica from Germina III as both couple departed to afterlife. Reda and Reka are portrayed by Takuya Komatsu (小松 拓也, Komatsu Takuya) and Yukiko Nagatsuka (永塚 由紀子, Nagatsuka Yukiko).
- Protean Life Form Gelworm (変幻生命体 ゲルワーム, Hengen Seimei-tai Geruwāmu; 23): Caterpillar-like life forms emerging from the Katra Meteorite (カトラ隕石, Katora Inseki). The male blue Gelworm M (ゲルワームM, Geruwāmu Emu) tried to search for its mate the female pink Gelworm P (ゲルワームP, Geruwāmu Pī) that was left behind in the meteorite, which was at the mineral research laboratory of Hokuryo College. The blue Gelworm sampled various individual's DNA to assume human disguises until it reached the lab where it accidentally exposed to a dose of liquefied gas that caused it to grow into large proportions. During its fight against Cosmos, Gelworm assumed the Ultraman's form until he reverted as Fubuki returned the Katra Meteorite. The giant Gelworm M returned to its diminutive form and reunited with Gelworm P, as the meteorite returned to space.
  - Imit-Ultraman Cosmos (ニセウルトラマンコスモス, Nise Urutoraman Kosumosu; 23): After using its pincers to sample on Cosmos' DNA, the giant Gelworm M took the form of the Ultra's Luna Mode, both were evenly matched in terms of fight style and speed. However, the imitation lacks the ability to copy Cosmos' techniques and in the end reverted to Gelworm after receiving Full Moon Rect.
- Super Galaxy Aliens Alien Sreiyu "Lamia" (超銀河宇宙人 スレイユ星人 ラミア, Chō Ginga Uchūjin Sureiyu Seijin Ramia; 25): Originally a race that lived in a peaceful society devoid from any forms of military and weapons until countless invasion and wars from other planets devastated their culture. Their representative, Lamia was sent to Earth with their robot Guinje to eliminate the planet after deeming their inhabitant barbaric. Her capsule was ejected from said robot as she was under the care of Dr. Kawaya until she escaped a week later. She lost Guinje's activation key to a trio of teenagers that accidentally awakened the robot by mistake. After regaining the key, she was at first adamant with her decision until Kawaya's action in protecting her changed her mind. Once she healed the doctor, Lamia deactivated Guinje and departed from Earth. She is portrayed by Becky (ベッキー, Bekkī), whose appearance in the series is due to her past role in Booska! Booska!! as Lulu, down to the point of wearing the same clothes.
- Planet Demolishing Robot Guinje (惑星破壊ロボット グインジェ, Wakusei Hakai Robotto Guinje; 25): The Sreiyu race's robot which transforms into a spaceship when not in combat. A week after it crash landed on Earth, Guinje shed its disguise and commence elimination on Earth through a missile on its lower abdomen. Activated through a trio of teenagers by accident, it fought against Cosmos and the JADF forces until Lamia regained the key and stopped the robot before leaving Earth.
- Poison Gas Monster Eligal (毒ガス怪獣 エリガル, Dokugasu Kaijū Erigaru; 28): A monster that Team EYES failed to secure in the past. One particular subspecies reappeared to be infected by the Chaos Header, which Eligal struggled to fight against. As Team EYES failed to notice its presence, they fired the anesthesia bullet that caused the monster to be weakened, giving Chaos Header a slighter chance to fight back. With Chaos Header developed immunity for Luna and Corona Extract, Cosmos was forced to empower his exorcism attack until the Chaos Header expelled. Eligal died from its injuries. Although known to be a gentle monster, Eligal is prone to attack by unleashing poisonous gas from its back as means of self defense. During Chaos Header's partial possession, Eligal gained the additional ability to exhale the poison gas from its mouth after its exhaust pipes were blocked.
  - Chaos Eligal (カオスエリガル, Kaosu Erigaru; 28): The infected duplicate of Eligal when Chaos Header was exorcised, due to a part of Team EYES' mistake in firing the anesthesia bullet. It gained a pair of sickles on each hands and can fire energy beam from its orb chest. The Chaos Eligal was destroyed by Cosmos Corona Mode's Blazing Wave.
  - Poison Gas Monster Eligal II (毒ガス怪獣 エリガルII, Dokugasu Kaijū Erigaru Tsū; 28): A second breed of Eligal was infected by Chaos Header to serve as a decoy for Musashi and Fubuki to get out from the Treasure Base. Unlike the first generation, Cosmos saved it by expelling the Chaos Header and altered its tissue structure to remove its poison gas emitting ability.
    - Chaos Eligal II (カオスエリガルII, Kaosu Erigaru Tsū; 28): The infected form of Eligal II.
- Ancient Sea God Raycura (古代海神 レイキュラ, Kodai Kaijin Reikyura; 34): An environmental conservation device made by a mysterious ancient civilization and stored within the ocean floor at the coastal area of Otofue, but begins to move when the sea becomes contaminated. From its fist, Raycura can shoot bubble shaped destruction sphere as ranged projectiles. Yukari Yoshii, a person with a pure of heart, placed the rainbow-colored sea conch to a meteor stone, which halted Raycura's assault and for Cosmos to return it to the ocean floor.
- Alien Greenbelt "Platea" (グリーンベルト星人 プラテア, Gurīnberuto Seijin Puratea; 41): (Note: In the show, she is credited as the "humamoid space plant life form from Planet Greenbelt" (グリーンベルト星の人型宇宙植物生命体, Gurīnberuto-sei no Hito-gata Uchū Shokubutsu Seimei-tai) and in the magazines as "green alien" (緑の宇宙人, Midori no Uchūjin).) A race of alien living in Planet Greenbelt of K57 Star System who was hunted down by the neighboring aliens from Planet Exter. Platea was the last of her kind and made her way to Earth where she was pursued by the bounty hunter robot Exter Raider. In order for her kind to survive, Platea sent her seed to Kasumi before dying. She is portrayed by Etsuko Mizutani (水谷 悦子, Mizutani Etsuko), whose face was painted green while her whole body is expressed with CG. This was done due to the director Teruyoshi Ishii believing that simple props were not enough convincing.
- Crustacean Monster Alukela (甲殻怪獣 アルケラ, Kōkaku Kaijū Arukera; 49): A monster which suddenly appeared in the R2 forest area and is capable of spitting Explosive Light Bullet (爆光弾, Baku Kōdan) from its mouth. Its true identity is an adult Snowstar, whose purpose is to end its life and became a pupa to produce several more of its kind, but Team EYES and J.A.D.F. were yet to learn of this and assumed the monster was slowly dying at the end of its life. Cosmos stopped Alukela from marching to a populated area before the monster finally died and gave birth to Snowstars.
  - Mysterious Group Beast Snowstar (神秘群獣 スノースター, Shinpi Gun-jū Sunōsutā; 49): Space life forms that gained the nickname "space snow". They were known to feed on radioactive waste and was seen as a protected creature, even to the J.A.D.F..
- Natural Enemy Monster Mazarugas (天敵怪獣 マザルガス, Tenteki Kaijū Mazarugasu; 51): A pitcher plant-like monster who served as a natural enemy to Chaos Headers, it feeds and digest them through the Chaos Chimera (カオスキメラ, Kaosu Kimera) enzyme, catching the interest of Team EYES as their hope in fighting against Chaos Header. The Chaos Header try to eliminate Mazarugas by luring it to J.A.D.F.'s ammunition warehouse while J.A.D.F. likewise had the same idea through Dabides 909 missile. With Team EYES and Cosmos failed to secure the monster, the Dabides missile was fired and caused the Chaos Chimera enzyme within Mazarugas to be destroyed. After Cosmos exorcised the Chaos Header, Mazarugas died as Cosmos brought its carcass to outer space. Aside from feeding on Chaos, Mazarugas also devour any form of energies, burrowing underground and spits Mazaru Bomb (マザルボム, Mazaru Bomu) from its mouth.
  - Chaos Mazarugas (カオスマザルガス, Kaosu Mazarugasu; 51): After Mazarugas was weakened and had its Chaos Chimera enzyme destroyed by the Dabides 909 missile, Chaos Header took the opportunity to infect their natural enemy in against Cosmos. The Chaos Mazarugas had a different roar, sporting reddish spikes on its head and exhaled Destruction Beam (破壊ビーム, Hakai Bīmu) from its mouth. Despite Cosmos' attempt in purifying Mazarugas, the monster died shortly after as a result of the aforementioned missile.
- Super-advanced Civilization People Mitoru (Alien Girl) (超高度文明人 ミトル（宇宙人少女）, Chō Kōdo Bunmei-jin Mitoru (Uchūjin Shōjo); 55): An alien girl from an unnamed race, sent to test the humanity by turning the second Mienin into Gamoran II and restrain Musashi to prevent him from interfering. However, seeing Fubuki's determination for a peaceful solution, she released the youth for Cosmos to neutralize the situation. Although she declared that humanity has passed the test, Mitoru even concluded that this was partly an influence from Cosmos' arrival on Earth. She is portrayed by Hitomi Akimoto (秋元 眸, Akimoto Hitomi).
