= Kinoko =

Japanese mythological creature

The kinoko (木の子) is a yōkai told in legends of the Kinki region.

== Concept ==
In the Yoshino region of Nara Prefecture and in Hyōgo Prefecture, they are yōkai said to be in mountainous regions and are a type of the mountain yōkai yamawaro.

They appear as children from two to four years of age and wear clothes that are made of leaves or are blue. It's said that when a human sees one, they look like a shadow, making it hard to tell if one is actually there or not.

They usually play together as a group. It is said that woodcutters and other people who work in the mountains catch sight of them from time to time and so they are not an unusual sight to them. However, it is said that if one is not cautious and gets caught unprepared, one could be pranked such as by having one's bentō stolen, so when something like that ever happens, one should use a stick to shoo them away.

== See also ==
- Yamawaro
