= Yamawaro =

Mountain dwelling spirit in Japanese folklore

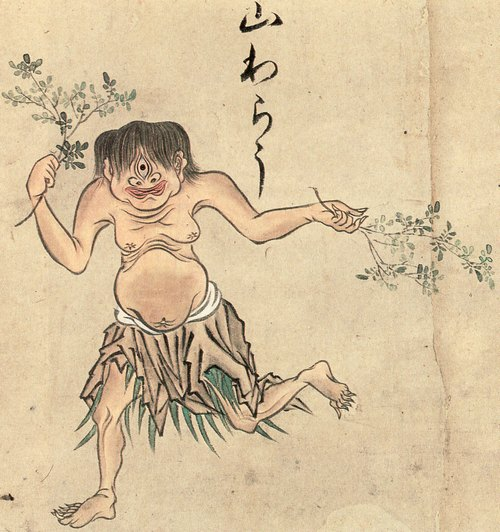
Yamawarau (山わらう) from the Hyakkai Zukan by Sawaki Sūshi

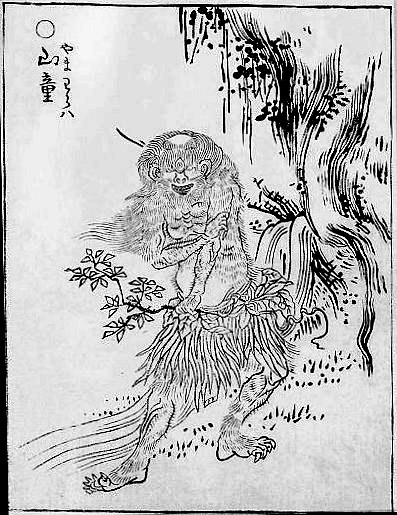
Yamawarau (山童) from the Gazu Hyakki Yagyō by Toriyama Sekien

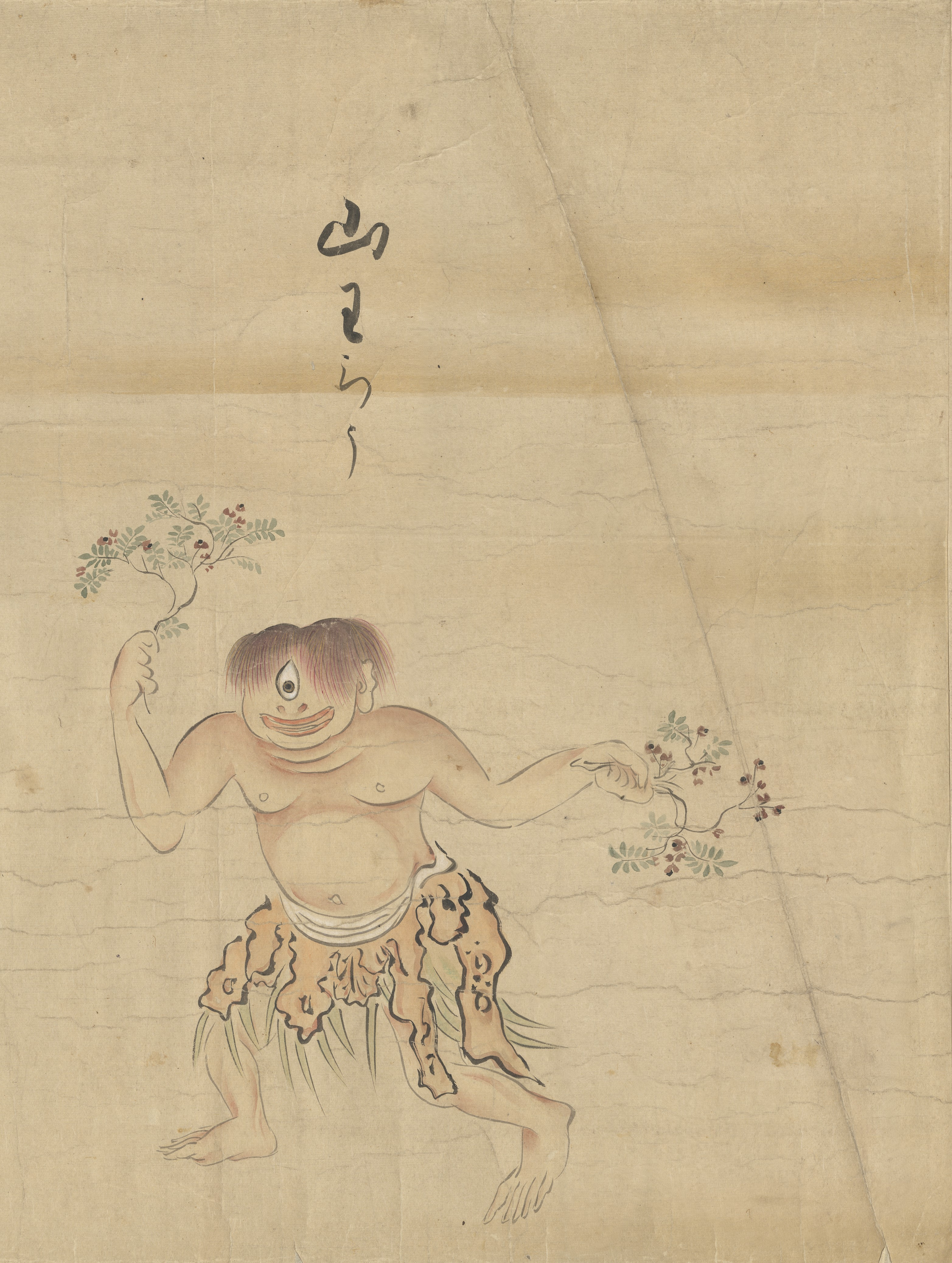
Yama warō (山わらう) from Bakemono no e (化物之繪) (c. 1700), Harry F. Bruning Collection of Japanese Books and Manuscripts, Brigham Young University

Yamawaro (山童; or yamawarau) is a yōkai (spirit) said to appear in mountains in Western Japan, starting in the Kyūshū region. According to mythology, it is sometimes said that they are kappa that have come to dwell in the mountains.

Yamawaro are known by a number of different, similar terms; in Ashikita District, Kumamoto Prefecture, they are also known as yamawarō, yamamon, yamanto, yaman wakkashi (山の若い衆, "young person of the mountain") and yaman ojiyan (山の伯父やん, "mountain uncle"). In Kuma District in the same prefecture, they are also known as yaman-tarō (山ん太郎) or yamanbo (山ん坊).

The kanji for yamawaro can also be written as 山𤢖 (yamawaro). The sansō (山𤢖) is the name of the Chinese yōkai that this comes from.

== Description ==
According to the Edo-period Wakan Sansai Zue, yamawaro lives in the depths of the mountains in Kyushu. It appears as a child about 10 years in age, has long perssimon and navy colored hair on its head, and has intricate fur all over its body. The Wakan Sansai Zue states that yamawaro has a short torso, walks upright on two long legs, and speaks in human language. The same book (the version published by Kyōrindō) states that there are yamawaro in the Chikuzen Province (now Fukuoka Prefecture) and on the Gotō Islands, and they have a human-like appearance with a round head, long red hair that reaches their eyes, pointy ears like that of a dog, one eye above their nose, and they eat crabs, tokoro (some types of dioscorea), and kōzo (a hybrid of two broussonetia species) roots.

In the Kumamoto Prefecture, yamawaro hate ink lines, which are used for carpentry, so it is thought that in places where carpentry work is done in the mountains, if one uses an ink line to make lines of ink, yamawaro would not come close.

It is said that sometimes they help out with lumberjack work in the mountains and that they would help out again by giving them alcohol and nigirimeshi as thanks. The goods given to a yamawaro as thanks must be the same as the ones promised at first, and if something different is given instead, they get unfeelingly angry. It is also said that if they are given their thank-you presents before the work is done, they sometimes run away with it. In the Ashikita District, Kumamoto, it is said that when there is a lot of work in the mountains, they say "let's ask for some help from some yaman wakkashi" and ask yamawaro for help.

Like the kappa, they also perform sumo and like to play pranks on cattle and horses. They are also said to enter people's homes without permission and enter into their baths, and it is said that the baths that a yamawaro enters in would get dirty with grease floating in them as well as a very foul odor.

Tengu-daoshi and other strange events in the mountains are often considered to be the deeds of mountain gods or tengu in the Eastern half of Japan, but in the Western half they are considered to be the deeds of yamawaro. Phenomena such as the tengu-daoshi (sounds such as that of a large tree falling) are considered to be done by the yamawaro themselves, and in the Kumamoto Prefecture, other than stories where they would make falling tree or falling rock noises, there are also stories where they would imitate human songs and where they make sounds imitating mokko (a tool made of bamboo or woven grass for carrying heavy loads) dropping dirt or even the explosion sounds of dynamite. However, the tengu does not play no role at all in those regions, because in some parts, such as the Oguni in Kuamoto Prefecture, there are no yamawaro legends and they are instead considered to be the deeds of tengu.

=== Yamawaro and kappa migration ===
In various places in the Western half of Japan, there have been confirmed to be legends where yamawaro are kappa that have moved into mountains. In many of them, kappa would move into the mountains during the autumn Higan to become yamawaro, and during the spring Higan they would move back to the rivers to become kappa.

- Kuma District, Kumamoto Prefecture: kawan-tarō and yaman-tarō would switch with each other every February 1 (called the "Tarō Tsuitachi" (太郎朔日))
- Kumamoto Prefecture: Garappa would move to the mountains during the autumn Higan to become garappa and would return to the rivers during the spring Higan to become garappa.
- Minamata, Kumamoto Prefecture: On June 1 (氷朔日, "kōri tsuitachi"), garappa would go from the mountains into the rivers.
- Wakayama Prefecture: Gaoro would go into the mountains to become kashanbo in the autumn and would return to the rivers to become gaoro in the springtime.
- Yoshino Region, Nara Prefecture: kawa-tarō would go into the mountains to become yama-tarō during autumn Higan and return to the rivers to become kawa-tarō during spring.

The folkloricist Kunio Yanagita theorizes with words such as "river-child migration" that these seasonal changes between kappa and yamawaro comes from the seasonal changes between faith and the field gods (Ta-no-Kami) and the mountain gods (Yama-no-Kami) and that since birds could often be heard in many places during those times, it may be related to the bird migrations that happen with Japan's seasonal changes.

It is said that when kappa and yamawaro go to and from mountains, they would move in a group through an 'osaki'. It is said that if a human ever built a house in this passageway, the kappa and yamawaro would get angry and open a hole in the walls. Is also said that if one ever tried to catch sight of the yamawaro returning to the mountains, one would fall into an illness. 'Osaki' (尾先) refers to the landscape and places that go down from a mountain and are considered to be lands that are not suited towards building houses. In the town of Omine, Aso District, Kumamoto Prefecture, the pathway that yamawaro use to move are called toorisuji (通り筋).

== Similar concepts ==
In the Hida Region (Gifu Prefecture), they are also called yamagaro and they are said to play pranks such as stealing bentō from woodcutters.

Similar yōkai to yamawaro include the seko, the kashanbo, and the kinoko. The seko told about in Nishimera, Miyazaki Prefecture are said to go into mountains during the evening and return to the rivers during morning. Also, in legends in Omine, Aso District, Kumamoto Prefecture, calling them "yamawaro" is thought to anger them so "seko" would be used instead as a more polite alternative.

== Paintings ==
In the yōkai emaki of the Edo period (such as the Hyakkai Zukan) and the Jikkai Sugoroku (十界双六) among others, yamawaro are written about under the name of yamawarawa (山童; also yamawarau) and they are often depicted with tree branch arms and one eye. According to the Edo-period Kiyū Shōran (嬉遊笑覧), it can be seen that one of the yōkai that it notes is depicted in the Bakemono E (化物絵) drawn by Kōhōgen Motonobu is one by the name of "yama-warawa" (山わらは).

== In popular culture ==
- The Pokémon Dusknoir is inspired by the yamawaro.
- Takane Yamashiro, the Stage 2 boss of Touhou 18: Unconnected Marketeers is a yamawaro.

== See also ==
- Cyclops
- List of Japanese legendary creatures
